= Scythris tugaiensis =

Scientific classification
- Kingdom: Animalia
- Phylum: Arthropoda
- Clade: Pancrustacea
- Class: Insecta
- Order: Lepidoptera
- Family: Scythrididae
- Genus: Scythris
- Species: S. tugaiensis

Binomial name
- Scythris tugaiensis Nupponen, 2009

Species of moth

Scythris tugaiensis is a moth species of the family Scythrididae. It was described by Kari Nupponen in 2009. It is found in Uzbekistan. The habitat consists of riverside woods, surrounded by desert steppes.

== Etymology ==
The species name refers to the Tugai forest, the type locality.
