= Scythris xylinochra =

Scientific classification
- Kingdom: Animalia
- Phylum: Arthropoda
- Class: Insecta
- Order: Lepidoptera
- Family: Scythrididae
- Genus: Scythris
- Species: S. xylinochra

Binomial name
- Scythris xylinochra Meyrick, 1931

Synonyms
- Scythris zylinochra

Species of moth

Scythris xylinochra is a moth of the family Scythrididae. It was described by Edward Meyrick in 1931. It is found in India.

The wingspan is about 12 mm. The forewings are brownish-ochreous and the hindwings are light grey.
