= Scythris turanica =

Scientific classification
- Kingdom: Animalia
- Phylum: Arthropoda
- Clade: Pancrustacea
- Class: Insecta
- Order: Lepidoptera
- Family: Scythrididae
- Genus: Scythris
- Species: S. turanica

Binomial name
- Scythris turanica Nupponen, 2009

Species of moth

Scythris turanica is a moth species of the family Scythrididae. It was described by Kari Nupponen in 2009. It is found in south-western Kazakhstan. The habitat consists of desert steppes.

== Description ==
The wingspan is about 12 mm.
