= Scythris deplanata =

Scientific classification
- Kingdom: Animalia
- Phylum: Arthropoda
- Class: Insecta
- Order: Lepidoptera
- Family: Scythrididae
- Genus: Scythris
- Species: S. deplanata

Binomial name
- Scythris deplanata Meyrick, 1928

Species of moth

Scythris deplanata is a moth of the family Scythrididae. It was described by Edward Meyrick in 1928. It is found in Kashmir and Kumaon.

The wingspan is 14–15 mm. The forewings are rather glossy whitish-grey, with the plical and second discal stigmata minute, faintly grey and hardly traceable. The hindwings are grey.
