= Scythris thomisioides =

Scientific classification
- Kingdom: Animalia
- Phylum: Arthropoda
- Clade: Pancrustacea
- Class: Insecta
- Order: Lepidoptera
- Family: Scythrididae
- Genus: Scythris
- Species: S. thomisioides

Binomial name
- Scythris thomisioides Bengtsson, 1997

Species of moth

Scythris thomisioides is a moth of the family Scythrididae. It was described by Bengt Å. Bengtsson in 1997. It is found in Tunisia.
