= Scythris zeugmatica =

Scientific classification
- Kingdom: Animalia
- Phylum: Arthropoda
- Class: Insecta
- Order: Lepidoptera
- Family: Scythrididae
- Genus: Scythris
- Species: S. zeugmatica

Binomial name
- Scythris zeugmatica Meyrick, 1931

Species of moth

Scythris zeugmatica is a moth of the family Scythrididae. It was described by Edward Meyrick in 1931. It is found in Brazil (Santarem).
