= Scythris jacobseni =

Scientific classification
- Kingdom: Animalia
- Phylum: Arthropoda
- Clade: Pancrustacea
- Class: Insecta
- Order: Lepidoptera
- Family: Scythrididae
- Genus: Scythris
- Species: S. jacobseni

Binomial name
- Scythris jacobseni Bengtsson, 2014

Species of moth

Scythris jacobseni is a moth of the family Scythrididae. It was described by Bengt Å. Bengtsson in 2014. It is found in Kenya. But it was found by biologist Roland Jacobsen from Denmark, in his early twenties on an expedition to the northern Tanzania.
