= Scythris onerica =

Scientific classification
- Kingdom: Animalia
- Phylum: Arthropoda
- Clade: Pancrustacea
- Class: Insecta
- Order: Lepidoptera
- Family: Scythrididae
- Genus: Scythris
- Species: S. onerica

Binomial name
- Scythris onerica Nupponen, 2009

Species of moth

Scythris onerica is a moth species of the family Scythrididae. It was described by Kari Nupponen in 2009. It is found in south-western Kazakhstan. The habitat consists of desert steppes.

== Etymology ==
The species name refers to Oneri spring, the type locality.
