= Scythris cramella =

Scientific classification
- Kingdom: Animalia
- Phylum: Arthropoda
- Clade: Pancrustacea
- Class: Insecta
- Order: Lepidoptera
- Family: Scythrididae
- Genus: Scythris
- Species: S. cramella

Binomial name
- Scythris cramella Nupponen, 2009

Species of moth

Scythris cramella is a moth of the family Scythrididae. It was described by Kari Nupponen in 2009. It is found in Uzbekistan. The habitat consists of sandy deserts.

== Description ==
The wingspan is 8.5-10.5 mm.
