= Scythris capitalis =

Scientific classification
- Kingdom: Animalia
- Phylum: Arthropoda
- Class: Insecta
- Order: Lepidoptera
- Family: Scythrididae
- Genus: Scythris
- Species: S. capitalis

Binomial name
- Scythris capitalis (Erschoff, 1874)

Synonyms
- Butalis capitalis Erschoff, 1874

Species of moth

Scythris capitalis is a moth of the family Scythrididae. It was described by Nikolay Grigoryevich Erschoff in 1874. It is found in Afghanistan, Kazakhstan, Kyrgyzstan, Turkey, Turkmenistan, Tajikistan and Uzbekistan.
