= Scythris tytrella =

Scientific classification
- Kingdom: Animalia
- Phylum: Arthropoda
- Class: Insecta
- Order: Lepidoptera
- Family: Scythrididae
- Genus: Scythris
- Species: S. tytrella

Binomial name
- Scythris tytrella Falkovitsh, 1969

Species of moth

Scythris tytrella is a moth species of the family Scythrididae. The species was first described by Mark I. Falkovitsh in 1969; the first description of the female genitalia occurred in 2009 by Kari Nupponen. It is found in Kazakhstan and Uzbekistan.
