= Scythris timoi =

Scientific classification
- Kingdom: Animalia
- Phylum: Arthropoda
- Clade: Pancrustacea
- Class: Insecta
- Order: Lepidoptera
- Family: Scythrididae
- Genus: Scythris
- Species: S. timoi

Binomial name
- Scythris timoi Nupponen, 2009

Species of moth

Scythris timoi is a moth of the family Scythrididae. It was described by Kari Nupponen in 2009. It is found in Uzbekistan. The habitat consists of riverside woods, surrounded by desert steppes.

== Etymology ==
The species is dedicated to Timo Nupponen, the brother of the author.
