= Scythris nigrogrammella =

Scientific classification
- Kingdom: Animalia
- Phylum: Arthropoda
- Clade: Pancrustacea
- Class: Insecta
- Order: Lepidoptera
- Family: Scythrididae
- Genus: Scythris
- Species: S. nigrogrammella

Binomial name
- Scythris nigrogrammella Bengtsson, 2002

Species of moth

Scythris nigrogrammella is a moth of the family Scythrididae. It was described by Bengt Å. Bengtsson in 2002. It is found in Sudan and Yemen.
