= Scythris dicroa =

Scientific classification
- Kingdom: Animalia
- Phylum: Arthropoda
- Class: Insecta
- Order: Lepidoptera
- Family: Scythrididae
- Genus: Scythris
- Species: S. dicroa

Binomial name
- Scythris dicroa Falkovitsh, 1972

Species of moth

Scythris dicroa is a moth species of the family Scythrididae. It was described by Mark I. Falkovitsh in 1972. It is found in Uzbekistan.
