= Scythris divergens =

Scientific classification
- Kingdom: Animalia
- Phylum: Arthropoda
- Clade: Pancrustacea
- Class: Insecta
- Order: Lepidoptera
- Family: Scythrididae
- Genus: Scythris
- Species: S. divergens

Binomial name
- Scythris divergens Bengtsson, 2005

Species of moth

Scythris divergens is a moth of the family Scythrididae. It was described by Bengt Å. Bengtsson in 2005. It is found in Turkey, Lebanon, Syria and Iraq.
