= Scythris iberica =

Scientific classification
- Kingdom: Animalia
- Phylum: Arthropoda
- Class: Insecta
- Order: Lepidoptera
- Family: Scythrididae
- Genus: Scythris
- Species: S. iberica

Binomial name
- Scythris iberica Jäckh, 1978

Species of moth

Scythris iberica is a moth of the family Scythrididae. It was described by Eberhard Jäckh in 1978. It is found in Spain.
