= Scythris hemidictyas =

Scientific classification
- Kingdom: Animalia
- Phylum: Arthropoda
- Class: Insecta
- Order: Lepidoptera
- Family: Scythrididae
- Genus: Scythris
- Species: S. hemidictyas

Binomial name
- Scythris hemidictyas Meyrick, 1928

Species of moth

Scythris hemidictyas is a moth of the family Scythrididae. It was described by Edward Meyrick in 1928. It is found in North America, where it has been recorded from Texas.

The wingspan is 12–14 mm. The forewings are light greyish, on the costal half often partially suffused dark grey, especially along the margins of the veins. There is a white costal streak from the base to near the apex and the veins are marked by white lines, on the costal half usually distinct, on the dorsal half usually more or less obscured by general whitish suffusion or longitudinal streaking. The hindwings are light grey.

== Taxonomy ==
The species is alternatively placed as a synonym of Neoscythris planipenella.
