= Scythris angustella =

Scientific classification
- Kingdom: Animalia
- Phylum: Arthropoda
- Clade: Pancrustacea
- Class: Insecta
- Order: Lepidoptera
- Family: Scythrididae
- Genus: Scythris
- Species: S. angustella

Binomial name
- Scythris angustella Nupponen, 2009

Species of moth

Scythris angustella is a moth of the family Scythrididae. It was described by Kari Nupponen in 2009. It is found in Uzbekistan. The habitat consists of edges of large saline deserts with halophytic vegetation.

The wingspan is 12.5–13 mm.
