= Scythris vogelfederbergensis =

Scientific classification
- Kingdom: Animalia
- Phylum: Arthropoda
- Clade: Pancrustacea
- Class: Insecta
- Order: Lepidoptera
- Family: Scythrididae
- Genus: Scythris
- Species: S. vogelfederbergensis

Binomial name
- Scythris vogelfederbergensis Mey, 2011

Species of moth

Scythris vogelfederbergensis is a moth of the family Scythrididae. It was described by Wolfram Mey in 2011. It is found in Namibia.
