= Scythris pruinata =

Scientific classification
- Kingdom: Animalia
- Phylum: Arthropoda
- Class: Insecta
- Order: Lepidoptera
- Family: Scythrididae
- Genus: Scythris
- Species: S. pruinata

Binomial name
- Scythris pruinata Falkovitsh, 1972

Species of moth

Scythris pruinata is a moth of the family Scythrididae. It was described by Mark I. Falkovitsh in 1972. It is found in Iran and Uzbekistan.
