= Scythris coniobliquella =

Scientific classification
- Kingdom: Animalia
- Phylum: Arthropoda
- Clade: Pancrustacea
- Class: Insecta
- Order: Lepidoptera
- Family: Scythrididae
- Genus: Scythris
- Species: S. coniobliquella

Binomial name
- Scythris coniobliquella Bengtsson, 2014

Species of moth

Scythris coniobliquella is a moth of the family Scythrididae. It was described by Bengt Å. Bengtsson in 2014. It is found in Tanzania.
