= Scythris tumidella =

Scientific classification
- Kingdom: Animalia
- Phylum: Arthropoda
- Clade: Pancrustacea
- Class: Insecta
- Order: Lepidoptera
- Family: Scythrididae
- Genus: Scythris
- Species: S. tumidella

Binomial name
- Scythris tumidella Nupponen & Nupponen, 2001

Species of moth

Scythris tumidella is a moth of the family Scythrididae. It was described by Kari Nupponen and Timo Nupponen in 2001. It is found in Russia (Altai).
