= Scythris pallidella =

Scientific classification
- Kingdom: Animalia
- Phylum: Arthropoda
- Class: Insecta
- Order: Lepidoptera
- Family: Scythrididae
- Genus: Scythris
- Species: S. pallidella

Binomial name
- Scythris pallidella Passerin d'Entrèves & Roggero, 2006

Species of moth

Scythris pallidella is a moth of the family Scythrididae. It was described by Passerin d'Entrèves and Roggero in 2006. It is found in Mongolia, Tajikistan and Uzbekistan.
