= Scythris pretoriensis =

Scientific classification
- Kingdom: Animalia
- Phylum: Arthropoda
- Clade: Pancrustacea
- Class: Insecta
- Order: Lepidoptera
- Family: Scythrididae
- Genus: Scythris
- Species: S. pretoriensis

Binomial name
- Scythris pretoriensis Bengtsson, 2014

Species of moth

Scythris pretoriensis is a moth of the family Scythrididae. It was described by Bengt Å. Bengtsson in 2014. It is found in South Africa (Gauteng). Since its discovery, there have been 164 observations of S. pretoriensis moths.
