= Scythris bagdadiella =

Scientific classification
- Kingdom: Animalia
- Phylum: Arthropoda
- Class: Insecta
- Order: Lepidoptera
- Family: Scythrididae
- Genus: Scythris
- Species: S. bagdadiella

Binomial name
- Scythris bagdadiella Amsel, 1949

Species of moth

Scythris bagdadiella is a moth of the family Scythrididae. It was described by Hans Georg Amsel in 1949. It is found in Russia (southern Ural), Algeria, Turkey, Iraq, Afghanistan and Uzbekistan.

The larvae feed on Tamarix species.
