= Scythris hostilis =

Scientific classification
- Kingdom: Animalia
- Phylum: Arthropoda
- Clade: Pancrustacea
- Class: Insecta
- Order: Lepidoptera
- Family: Scythrididae
- Genus: Scythris
- Species: S. hostilis

Binomial name
- Scythris hostilis Nupponen, 2005

Species of moth

Scythris hostilis is a moth species of the family Scythrididae. It was described by Kari Nupponen in 2005. It is found in south-eastern Kazakhstan and Uzbekistan. The habitat consists of mountain steppes at elevations of 1,000-1,400 meters.
