= Scythris aquaria =

Scientific classification
- Kingdom: Animalia
- Phylum: Arthropoda
- Class: Insecta
- Order: Lepidoptera
- Family: Scythrididae
- Genus: Scythris
- Species: S. aquaria

Binomial name
- Scythris aquaria Meyrick, 1913

Species of moth

Scythris aquaria is a moth of the family Scythrididae. It was described by Edward Meyrick in 1913. It is found in South Africa (Gauteng, Mpumalanga), Namibia and Mozambique.

The wingspan is about 12 mm. The forewings are fuscous with a suffused white streak along the costa from one-fourth to the apex, with short suffused lines on the veins running into it. There is a strong white median streak from the base to beyond the middle, where it divides into several branches along the veins, and very faintly split along the fold. Suffused white sub-dorsal and dorsal lines run from the base to the tornus. The hindwings are dark grey.
