= Scythris nanophyti =

Scientific classification
- Kingdom: Animalia
- Phylum: Arthropoda
- Class: Insecta
- Order: Lepidoptera
- Family: Scythrididae
- Genus: Scythris
- Species: S. nanophyti

Binomial name
- Scythris nanophyti Falkovitsh, 1979

Species of moth

Scythris nanophyti is a moth species of the family Scythrididae. It was described by Mark I. Falkovitsh in 1979. It is found in Uzbekistan.
