= Scythris bifractella =

Scientific classification
- Kingdom: Animalia
- Phylum: Arthropoda
- Class: Insecta
- Order: Lepidoptera
- Family: Scythrididae
- Genus: Scythris
- Species: S. bifractella

Binomial name
- Scythris bifractella (Rebel, 1917)

Synonyms
- Laverna bifractella Rebel, 1917

Species of moth

Scythris bifractella is a moth of the family Scythrididae. It was described by Hans Rebel in 1917. It is found in Sudan.
