= Scythris passerini =

Scientific classification
- Kingdom: Animalia
- Phylum: Arthropoda
- Clade: Pancrustacea
- Class: Insecta
- Order: Lepidoptera
- Family: Scythrididae
- Genus: Scythris
- Species: S. passerini

Binomial name
- Scythris passerini (Bengtsson, 1997)

Synonyms
- Schythris passerini Bengtsson, 1997

Species of moth

Scythris passerini is a moth of the family Scythrididae. It was described by Bengt Å. Bengtsson in 1997. It is found in Iran, Libya and Syria.
