= Scythris brummanae =

Scientific classification
- Kingdom: Animalia
- Phylum: Arthropoda
- Class: Insecta
- Order: Lepidoptera
- Family: Scythrididae
- Genus: Scythris
- Species: S. brummanae

Binomial name
- Scythris brummanae Passerin d'Entrèves & Roggero, 2012

Species of moth

Scythris brummanae is a moth of the family Scythrididae. It was described by Pietro Passerin d'Entrèves and Angela Roggero in 2012. It is found in Lebanon.
