= Scythris fluxilis =

Scientific classification
- Kingdom: Animalia
- Phylum: Arthropoda
- Class: Insecta
- Order: Lepidoptera
- Family: Scythrididae
- Genus: Scythris
- Species: S. fluxilis

Binomial name
- Scythris fluxilis Falkovitsh, 1986

Species of moth

Scythris fluxilis is a moth species of the family Scythrididae. It was described by Mark I. Falkovitsh in 1986. It is found in Mongolia, Kazakhstan and Uzbekistan.
