= Scythris caballoides =

Scientific classification
- Kingdom: Animalia
- Phylum: Arthropoda
- Clade: Pancrustacea
- Class: Insecta
- Order: Lepidoptera
- Family: Scythrididae
- Genus: Scythris
- Species: S. caballoides

Binomial name
- Scythris caballoides Nupponen, 2009

Species of moth

Scythris caballoides is a moth of the family Scythrididae. It was described by Kari Nupponen in 2009. It is found in Uzbekistan. The habitat consists of riverside woods, surrounded by desert steppes.

The wingspan is 11-12.5 mm.
