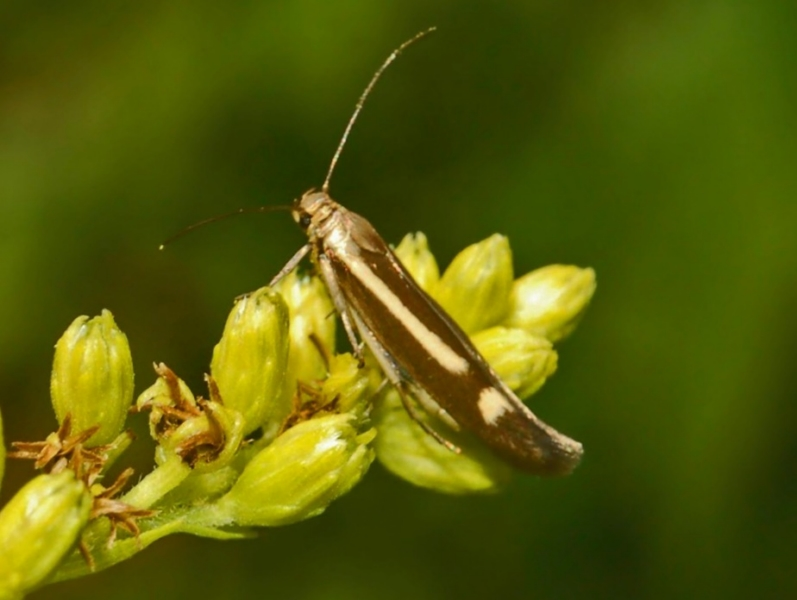
- Imago of Scythris heinemanni at Cerreto Ratti in Borghetto di Borbera, Italy

Scientific classification
- Kingdom: Animalia
- Phylum: Arthropoda
- Clade: Pancrustacea
- Class: Insecta
- Order: Lepidoptera
- Family: Scythrididae
- Genus: Scythris; Hübner, [1825]

Type species
- Tinea chenopodiella Hübner, [1813]

Species
- Numerous, see text

Synonyms
- Butalis Treitschke, 1833; Copida Sodoffsky, 1837; Galanthia Hübner, 1825; Rubioia Agenjo, 1962

= Scythris =

Genus of moths

Scythris is a genus of gelechioid moths. It is the type genus of the flower moth family, which is sometimes included as a subfamily in the Xyloryctidae, or together with these merged into the Oecophoridae. The genus was erected by Jacob Hübner in 1825.

It is the largest genus of flower moths, and as such might not be fully monophyletic with regard to some very small or monotypic genera placed in the same family. In addition, new species of Scythris continue to be discovered and described.

== Selected species ==
=== Species groups ===
The species of Scythris have been divided among several groups, which may or may not be monophyletic; those that are may – provided they are closely enough related to the type species S. limbella – be considered subgenera. There is a considerable number of species whose exact relationships are hitherto elusive. Some have been placed in a "monospecific species group" of their own, as they are too distinct from the other groups to be included there, yet at the same time have characteristic autapomorphies. Species groups include:

aenea group

- Scythris aenea Passerin d'Entrèves 1984

aerariella group

- Scythris adustella Jäckh, 1978
- Scythris aerariella (Herrich-Schäffer, 1855)
- Scythris anomaloptera (Staudinger, 1880)
- Scythris binotiferella (Ragonot, 1880)
- Scythris brummanae Passerin d'Entrèves & Roggero, 2012
- Scythris carboniella Jäckh, 1978
- Scythris corsa Passerin d'Entrèves, 1986
- Scythris dorycniella (Milliére, 1861)
- Scythris flaviventrella (Herrich-Schäffer, 1855)
- Scythris hungaricella Rebel, 1917
- Scythris imperiella Jäckh, 1978
- Scythris jaeckhi Bengtsson, 1989
- Scythris lhommei Bengtsson & Passerin d'Entrèves, 1988
- Scythris parnassiae Bengtsson, 1997
- Scythris popescugorji Passerin d'Entrèves, 1984
- Scythris ridiculella Caradja, 1920
- Scythris tergestinella (Zeller, 1855)
- Scythris tumidella K. & T.Nupponen, 2001

alseriella group

- Scythris alseriella (Turati, 1879)
- Scythris fasciatella (Ragonot, 1880)

Australian group

- Scythris adelopa Meyrick, 1897
- Scythris celidopa Meyrick, 1921
- Scythris ceratocosma Meyrick, 1897
- Scythris crypsigramma Meyrick, 1897
- Scythris detestata Meyrick, 1922
- Scythris diatoma (Turner, 1927)
- Scythris erebospila Meyrick, 1897
- Scythris fumida Turner, 1923
- Scythris hologramma (Lower, 1899)
- Scythris leucochyta (Turner, 1947)
- Scythris paredra Meyrick, 1897
- Scythris pleonectis Meyrick, 1897
- Scythris plocanota Meyrick, 1897
- Scythris praestructa Meyrick, 1922
- Scythris rhabducha Meyrick, 1897
- Scythris sporadica Meyrick, 1897
- Scythris xenonympha (Lower, 1900)

bagdadiella group

- Scythris bagdadiella Amsel, 1949
- Scythris caballoides Nupponen, 2009
- Scythris kabulella Passerin d'Entrèves & Roggero, 2011
- Scythris semifascia Nupponen, 2010
- Scythris tugaiensis Nupponen, 2009

bazaensis group

- Scythris bazaensis Bengtsson, 1997

boseanella group

- Scythris boseanella Klimesch, 1986

camelella group

- Scythris camelella Walsingham, 1907

canescens group

- Scythris angustella Nupponen, 2009
- Scythris appendicella Bengtsson, 1997
- Scythris articulatella Chrétien, 1915
- Scythris barbatella Chrétien, 1915
- Scythris biskraensis Bengtsson, 1997
- Scythris canescens (Staudinger, 1880)
- Scythris cupellella Bengtsson, 1997
- Scythris curlettii Bengtsson, 1997
- Scythris deserticola Nupponen, 2010
- Scythris eremella Chrétien, 1915
- Scythris eucharis Walsingham, 1907
- Scythris falkovitshi Nupponen, 2009
- Scythris karvoneni Nupponen, 2010
- Scythris maculosa Bengtsson, 1997
- Scythris neftae Bengtsson, 1997
- Scythris pura Walsingham, 1907
- Scythris senecai Bengtsson, 1997
- Scythris tessulatella Rebel, 1903

caramani group

- Scythris albisaxella K. & T.Nupponen, 2000
- Scythris arkaimensis Bengtsson, 2000
- Scythris caramani Staudinger, 1880
- Scythris cervella K. & T.Nupponen, 2001
- Scythris cultelloides Nupponen & Sinev, 2011
- Scythris eevae Nupponen, 2007
- Scythris erinacella Nupponen, 2003
- Scythris gorbunovi Nupponen, 2003
- Scythris hamatella K. & T.Nupponen, 2001
- Scythris hebesella Nupponen, 2005
- Scythris kullbergi Bengtsson, 1997
- Scythris lagomorphella Nupponen, 2002
- Scythris malozemovi Nupponen, 2003
- Scythris marashi Passerin d'Entrèves & Roggero, 2012
- Scythris sinevi Nupponen, 2003

cicadella group

- Scythris arenbergeri Passerin d'Entrèves, 1986
- Scythris bajanlegi Passerin d'Entrèves & Roggero, 2006
- Scythris cicadella (Zeller, 1839)
- Scythris latilineella K. Nupponen, 2013
- Scythris moldavicella Caradja, 1905 (= S. balcanica)
- Scythris potentillella (Zeller, 1847)
- Scythris ventosella Chrétien 1907

cistorum group

- Scythris cistorum (Milliére, 1876)
- Scythris nieukerkeni Bengtsson, 1989
- Scythris rondaensis Bengtsson, 1997

crassiuscula group

- Scythris crassiuscula (Herrich-Schäffer, 1855)

crypta group

- Scythris crypta Hannemann 1961

decrepidella group

- Scythris decrepidella Bengtsson, 1997
- Scythris goundafae Bengtsson, 1997

dissitella group

- Scythris dissitella (Zeller, 1847)

elenae group

- Scythris elenae K.Nupponen, 2000
- Scythris juerivetei Nupponen, 2005

empetrella group

- Scythris empetrella Karsholt & Nielsen 1976
- Scythris gozmanyi Passerin d'Entrèves 1986

fallacella group

- Scythris baldensis Passerin d'Entrèves 1979
- Scythris fallacella (Schläger 1847)
- Scythris larzacensis Delmas, 2010
- Scythris oelandicella Müller-Rutz 1922
- Scythris sappadensis Bengtsson, 1992
- Scythris tremalzoi Bengtsson, 1992

formicella group

- Scythris formicella Chrétien, 1915
- Scythris kebiliensis Bengtsson, 1997
- Scythris minima Bengtsson, 1997

fuscoaenea group

- Scythris derrai Bengtsson, 1991
- Scythris dissimilella (Herrich-Schäffer, 1855)
- Scythris fuscoaenea (Haworth, 1828)
- Scythris parafuscoaenea Bengtsson, 1991
- Scythris tabelli Junnilainen, 2002
- Scythris tenuivittella (Stainton, 1867)
- Scythris traugotti Bengtsson, 1991
- Scythris vartianae Kasy, 1962
- Scythris vittella (O.Costa, 1834)

fuscopterella group

- Scythris fuscopterella Bengtsson 1977

gobiensis group

- Scythris gobiensis Passerin d'Entrèves & Roggero, 2006

grandipennis group

- Scythris bornicensis Jäckh, 1977
- Scythris constanti Walsingham, 1898
- Scythris cupreella (Staudinger, 1859)
- Scythris ericetella (Heinemann, 1872)
- Scythris grandipennis (Haworth, 1828)
- Scythris kasyi Hannemann, 1962
- Scythris maroccensis Jäckh, 1977
- Scythris nevadensis Passerin d'Entrèves, 1990
- Scythris salviella Meess, 1910
- Scythris scipionella (Staudinger, 1859)
- Scythris scorpionella Jäckh, 1977
- Scythris siculella Jäckh, 1977
- Scythris tabidella (Herrich-Schäffer, 1855)

gravatella group

- Scythris gravatella (Zeller, 1847)

iagella group

- Scythris iagella Chrétien 1925

inclusella group

- Scythris inclusella (Lederer, 1855)

inertella group

- Scythris ethmiella Amsel, 1974
- Scythris inertella (Zeller, 1855)
- Scythris xanthopygella (Staudinger, 1859)

inspersella group

- Scythris inspersella (Hübner, [1817])

insulella ("ericivorella") group

- Scythris ericivorella (Ragonot, 1880)
- Scythris insulella (Staudinger, 1859)

karinae group

- Scythris karinae Bengtsson 1991

karsholti group

- Scythris karsholti Bengtsson, 1997

klimeschi group

- Scythris guimarensis Bengtsson, 1997
- Scythris klimeschi Passerin d'Entrèves, 1983

knochella group

- Scythris ambustella Bengtsson, 1997
- Scythris aspromontis Jäckh, 1978
- Scythris ciliatella Zerny, 1936
- Scythris heinemanni
- Scythris iberica Jäckh, 1978
- Scythris knochella (Fabricius, 1794)
- Scythris reticulella Nupponen, 2010
- Scythris schawerdae Rebel, 1931
- Scythris setiella (Zeller, 1870)
- Scythris staudingeri Jäckh, 1978

laminella group

- Scythris andersi Bengtsson, 1991
- Scythris bolognella Jäckh, 1978
- Scythris braschiella (O.Hofmann, 1897)
- Scythris bubaniae Walsingham, 1907
- Scythris danilevskyi Nupponen & Sinev, 2011
- Scythris eberhardi Bengtsson, 1997
- Scythris frankeniella Chrétien, 1916
- Scythris kailai Bengtsson, 1997
- Scythris laminella (Denis & Schiffermüller, 1775)
- Scythris saxella Bengtsson, 1991
- Scythris thomisioides Bengtsson, 1997

limbella group – possibly subgenus Scythris

- Scythris elegantella (D.Lucas, 1955)
- Scythris limbella

lobella group

- Scythris lobella K. Nupponen, 2013

mariannae group

- Scythris mariannae (Bengtsson, 1997)

martini group

- Scythris bengtbengtssoni Vives, 1994
- Scythris martini Bengtsson, 1991

meanderis group

- Scythris meanderis Bengtsson, 1997

monochreella group

- Scythris monochreella (Ragonot, 1896)

mus group

- Scythris mus Walsingham, 1898

nigrella group

- Scythris nigrella Jäckh, 1978

nipholecta group

- Scythris nipholecta Meyrick, 1924

noricella group

- Scythris noricella (Zeller, 1843)

obscurella group – possibly subgenus Galanthia

- Scythris amphonycella (Geyer, [1836])
- Scythris bengtssoni Patocka & Liska, 1989
- Scythris cuspidella (Denis & Schiffermüller, 1775)
- Scythris flavilaterella (Fuchs, 1886)
- Scythris hornigii (Zeller, 1855)
- Scythris lampyrella (Constant, 1865)
- Scythris mediella (Constant, 1855)
- Scythris obscurella (Scopoli, 1763)
- Scythris rouxella (Constant 1865) (sometimes in C. hornigii, tentatively placed here)
- Scythris speyeri (Heinemann & Wocke, 1876)
- Scythris shafferi Bengtsson, 2005
- Scythris abruptella Sachkov, 2013

palustris group

- Scythris palustris (Zeller, 1855)

pascuella group

- Scythris aciella Bengtsson, 1997
- Scythris albidella (Stainton, 1867)
- Scythris albosuffusella Nupponen, 2007
- Scythris barguzinensis Bengtsson & Liska, 1996
- Scythris bidzilyai Sachkov, 2013
- Scythris bifissella (O.Hofmann, 1889)
- Scythris caroxylella Falkovitsh, 1969
- Scythris claudiae Passerin d'Entrèves & Roggero, 2011
- Scythris cornuella Bengtsson, 1997
- Scythris cramella Nupponen, 2010
- Scythris flavidella Preissecker, 1911
- Scythris fluxilis Falkovitsh, 1986
- Scythris hemicycliella Nupponen, 2005
- Scythris kantarae Bengtsson, 1997
- Scythris karinupponei Bengtsson, 2000
- Scythris lagunae Jäckh, 1978
- Scythris mikkolai Sinev, 1993
- Scythris nigridorsella Nupponen, 2007
- Scythris orientella Sinev, 2001
- Scythris pascuella (Zeller, 1855)
- Scythris paullella (Herrich-Schäffer, 1855)
- Scythris perlucidella K. & T.Nupponen, 2000
- Scythris pudorinella (Möschler, 1866)
- Scythris rotundella Nupponen, 2010
- Scythris satyrella Staudinger, 1880
- Scythris subaerariella (Stainton, 1867)
- Scythris tabescentella (Staudinger, 1880)

passerini group

- Scythris passerini (Bengtsson, 1997)

penicillata group

- Scythris buraetica Nupponen, 2007
- Scythris penicillata (Chrétien 1900)
- Scythris spinella K. & T.Nupponen, 2001

petrella group

- Scythris arachnodes Walsingham, 1908
- Scythris hierroella Klimesch, 1986
- Scythris petrella Walsingham, 1908
- Scythris pseudoarachnodes Bengtsson, 1997

picaepennis group

- Scythris disparella (Tengström, 1848)
- Scythris picaepennis (Haworth, 1828)

pinker group

- Scythris pinkeri Klimesch, 1986

platypyga group

- Scythris platypyga (Staudinger, 1880)

podoliensis group

- Scythris podoliensis Rebel, 1938

polycarpaeae group

- Scythris polycarpaeae Klimesch, 1986

productella group

- Scythris nielseni Passerin d'Entrèves & Roggero, 2003
- Scythris productella (Zeller, 1839)

pulicella group

- Scythris antisymmetrica Nupponen, 2009
- Scythris apotomella Nupponen, 2007
- Scythris azrouensis Bengtsson, 1997
- Scythris corleyi Bengtsson, 1997
- Scythris langohri Passerin d'Entrèves, 1990
- Scythris pilella Bengtsson, 1991
- Scythris pulicella (Staudinger, 1859)
- Scythris skulei Bengtsson, 1997
- Scythris veletae Passerin d'Entrèves, 1990

punctivittella group

- Scythris albostriata Hannemann, 1961
- Scythris apicistrigella (Staudinger, 1870)
- Scythris atlasensis Bengtsson, 1997
- Scythris confluens (Staudinger, 1870)
- Scythris cycladeae Jäckh, 1978
- Scythris emichi (Anker, 1870)
- Scythris landryi Passerin d'Entrèves & Roggero, 2003
- Scythris punctivittella (O.Costa, 1836)
- Scythris trinacriae Passerin d'Entrèves 1984

rubioi group

- Scythris rubioi Agenjo, 1962 – possibly subgenus Rubioia

schleichiella group

- Scythris glacialis (Frey, 1870)
- Scythris gratiosella Jäckh, 1978
- Scythris schleichiella (Zeller, 1870)
- Scythris similis Hannemann, 1961
- Scythris subschleichiella Hannemann, 1961

scopolella group

- Scythris apicalis (Zeller, 1847)
- Scythris flabella (Mann, 1861)
- Scythris scopolella

seliniella group

- Scythris acarioides Bengtsson, 1997
- Scythris clavella (Zeller, 1855)
- Scythris seliniella (Zeller, 1839)
- Scythris subseliniella (Heinemann, 1876)
- Scythris villari Agenjo, 1971

siccella group

- Scythris lafauryi Passerin d'Entrèves 1986
- Scythris lempkei Bengtsson & Langohr, 1989
- Scythris siccella (Zeller, 1839)
- Scythris subsiccella Bengtsson, 1997

sinensis group

- Scythris sinensis (Felder & Rogenhofer, 1875)

subfasciata group

- Scythris anthracodes Walsingham, 1907
- Scythris friedeli Bengtsson, 1997
- Scythris levantina Passerin d'Entrèves & Vives, 1990
- Scythris locustella Chrétien, 1915
- Scythris pototskii Nupponen, 2005
- Scythris pseudolocustella Passerin d'Entrèves & Vives, 1990
- Scythris subfasciata (Staudinger, 1880)

tributella group

- Scythris tributella (Zeller, 1847)

unquisella group

- Scythris unquisella Bengtsson, 2005

? species group

- Scythris herati Passerin d'Entrèves & Roggero, 2003
- Scythris tauromeniella Passerin d'Entrèves & Roggero, 2003

=== Species incertae sedis ===
Finally, there are many species which are neither clearly assignable to any one species group, nor autapomorphic enough to be included in a monospecific "group". These include:

- Scythris abyanensis Bengtsson, 2002
- Scythris accumulata Meyrick, 1914
- Scythris achyropa Meyrick, 1916
- Scythris acipenserella K. & T.Nupponen, 2000
- Scythris acusella Passerin d'Entrèves & Roggero, 2012
- Scythris adelopa Meyrick, 1897
- Scythris aegrella K. Nupponen & Junnilainen, 2000
- Scythris albiangulella Bengtsson, 2002
- Scythris albipuncta Turner, 1939
- Scythris albocanella Bengtsson, 2002
- Scythris albogrammella Bengtsson, 2002
- Scythris alborzensis Passerin d'Entrèves & Roggero, 2011
- Scythris alceella Junnilainen, 2002
- Scythris alhamrae Bengtsson, 2002
- Scythris amplexella Bengtsson, 2002
- Scythris ampullella Passerin d'Entrèves & Roggero, 2012
- Scythris anchophylli Falkovitsh, 1969
- Scythris ancystra Bucheli, 2005
- Scythris anthracina Braun, 1923
- Scythris anthracodelta Meyrick, 1911
- Scythris aquaria Meyrick, 1913
- Scythris arenicola K.Nupponen, 2005
- Scythris arerai Huemer, 2000
- Scythris aristidella Rebel, 1902
- Scythris astragali Falkovitsh, 1969
- Scythris atascosa (Landry, 1991)
- Scythris atollicola Nupponen & Saldaitis, 2013
- Scythris autochlorella Paulian & Viette, 1955
- Scythris axenopa Meyrick, 1918
- Scythris balanophora Meyrick, 1916
- Scythris balkhi Passerin d'Entrèves & Roggero, 2008
- Scythris balli (Landry, 1991)
- Scythris basilaris (Zeller, 1855)
- Scythris basilicella Bengtsson, 2002
- Scythris basistrigella (Staudinger, 1880)
- Scythris beccella Bengtsson, 2002
- Scythris bernardlandryi Bucheli, 2005
- Scythris biacutella Bengtsson, 2002
- Scythris bicuspidella Bengtsson, 2002
- Scythris bifasciella Passerin d'Entrèves & Roggero, 2011
- Scythris bifractella (Rebel, 1917)
- Scythris bispinella Bengtsson, 2002
- Scythris brachyplecta Meyrick, 1928
- Scythris brandti Passerin d'Entrèves & Roggero, 2008
- Scythris brunneofasciella K. Nupponen & Junnilainen, 2000
- Scythris buszkoi Baran, 2003
- Scythris canceroides Bengtsson, 1997
- Scythris canella Bengtsson, 2002
- Scythris capitalis (Erschoff, 1874)
- Scythris capnofasciae Bengtsson, 2002
- Scythris cassiterella (Snellen, 1884) (= S. baikalensis)
- Scythris celidopa Meyrick, 1921
- Scythris ceratella Bengtsson, 2002
- Scythris ceratocosma Meyrick, 1897
- Scythris charon Meyrick, 1918
- Scythris chelota Meyrick, 1906
- Scythris chloraema (Meyrick, 1887)
- Scythris chrysopygella Caradja, 1927
- Scythris cinisella Bengtsson, 2002
- Scythris cirra Falkovitsh, 1969<
- Scythris clemens Meyrick, 1921
- Scythris cometa Meyrick, 1909
- Scythris commota Meyrick, 1918
- Scythris complexa Sinev, 2001
- Scythris concurrens Meyrick, 1921
- Scythris consimilella Bengtsson, 2002
- Scythris cretacella K. & T.Nupponen, 2000
- Scythris cretiflua Meyrick, 1913
- Scythris crypsigramma Meyrick, 1897
- Scythris cucullella Bengtsson, 2002
- Scythris culmicola Meyrick, 1916
- Scythris cuneata Bucheli, 2005
- Scythris cuneatella Bengtsson, 2002
- Scythris curvipilella Bengtsson, 2002
- Scythris darwini Bucheli, 2005
- Scythris delodelta Meyrick, 1930
- Scythris denticolor Walsingham, 1900
- Scythris deplanata Meyrick, 1928
- Scythris depressa Meyrick, 1931
- Scythris deprinsi Bengtsson, 2005
- Scythris deresella Falkovitsh, 1969
- Scythris detestata Meyrick, 1922
- Scythris diatoma (Turner, 1927)
- Scythris dicroa Falkovitsh, 1972
- Scythris digitibasella Nupponen & Saldaitis, 2013
- Scythris dimensa Meyrick, 1920
- Scythris dimota Meyrick, 1931
- Scythris discimaculella Rebel, 1936
- Scythris distactica Meyrick, 1921
- Scythris divaricata Braun, 1923
- Scythris divergens Bengtsson, 2005
- Scythris dividua Meyrick, 1916
- Scythris durandella (Lucas, 1949)
- Scythris eboracensis (Zeller, 1855)
- Scythris eburnea (Walsingham, 1888)
- Scythris ejiciens Meyrick, 1928
- Scythris elachistoides Bengtsson, 2002
- Scythris elburzi Passerin d'Entrèves & Roggero, 2008
- Scythris eloquens Meyrick, 1921
- Scythris epistrota (Meyrick, 1889)
- Scythris erebospila Meyrick, 1897
- Scythris erinacella Nupponen, 2003
- Scythris eversmanni K. & T. Nupponen, 2000
- Scythris expolita Meyrick, 1910
- Scythris exsoluta Meyrick, 1920
- Scythris faeculenta Meyrick, 1912
- Scythris falcata Bucheli, 2005
- Scythris farrata Meyrick, 1913
- Scythris farsi Passerin d'Entrèves & Roggero, 2009
- Scythris fasciata Falkovitsh, 1969
- Scythris felesella Bengtsson, 1997
- Scythris felixi Bengtsson & Sutter, 1996
- Scythris fibigeri Bengtsson, 2002
- Scythris fissurella Bengtsson, 1996
- Scythris fluvialis Meyrick, 1916
- Scythris fonticola Meyrick, 1911
- Scythris formidabilis (Landry, 1991)
- Scythris fumida Turner, 1923
- Scythris furculata Bucheli, 2005
- Scythris fuscicomella (Clemens, 1860)
- Scythris galapagosensis Bucheli, 2005
- Scythris galeatella Bengtsson, 2002
- Scythris ganesha Nupponen & Sinev, 2011
- Scythris garciapitai Vives, 2001
- Scythris ghaemii Bengtsson & Huemer, 2003
- Scythris gladiella K. & T.Nupponen, 2004
- Scythris glaphyropa Meyrick, 1914
- Scythris glyphidota Meyrick, 1916
- Scythris gratifica Meyrick, 1921
- Scythris halmyrodes Meyrick, 1921
- Scythris halophiliella Amsel, 1935
- Scythris haloxylella Falkovitsh, 1969
- Scythris hemidictyas Meyrick, 1928
- Scythris hamardabanica Nupponen, 2003
- Scythris heikkii Nupponen, 2007
- Scythris hologramma (Lower, 1899)
- Scythris hostilis Nupponen, 2005
- Scythris hyalinella Caradja, 1920
- Scythris hydronoma Meyrick, 1930
- Scythris hymenata (Landry, 1991)
- Scythris ianitella Nupponen, 2005
- Scythris iconiensis Rebel, 1902
- Scythris ilyopa Meyrick, 1921
- Scythris immaculatella (Chambers, 1875)
- Scythris immunis Meyrick, 1916
- Scythris inanima Meyrick, 1916
- Scythris inconspicuella Sinev, 2001
- Scythris indigoferivora Bengtsson, 2002
- Scythris ingens Nupponen, 2005
- Scythris inornatella (Chambers, 1880)
- Scythris interrupta Braun, 1920
- Scythris invisa Meyrick, 1920
- Scythris iterella Bengtsson, 2002
- Scythris jakutica Sinev, 2001
- Scythris jalavai Sinev, 1993
- Scythris jemenensis Bengtsson, 2002
- Scythris justifica Meyrick, 1911
- Scythris karini Bengtsson, 1991
- Scythris kaszabi Passerin d'Entrèves & Roggero, 2006
- Scythris kaschmirica Bengtsson, 2005
- Scythris kefensis Nupponen, 2001
- Scythris kolachii Passerin d'Entrèves & Roggero, 2012
- Scythris kyzylensis Bengtsson, 1997
- Scythris lactanea Meyrick, 1913
- Scythris lamprochalca Meyrick, 1931
- Scythris latebrosa Meyrick, 1913
- Scythris lativalvella Sinev, 2001
- Scythris lativittis Gerasimov, 1930
- Scythris leucochyta (Turner, 1947)
- Scythris libanotica Jäckh, 1978
- Scythris linnavuorii Bengtsson, 2005
- Scythris longissima (Landry, 1991)
- Scythris luxatiella K.Nupponen & Kaitila, 2000
- Scythris lycii Falkovitsh, 1969
- Scythris macrourella Sinev, 2001
- Scythris medullata Meyrick, 1916
- Scythris melanodora Meyrick, 1912
- Scythris meraula Meyrick, 1916
- Scythris mesoplecta Meyrick, 1921
- Scythris minorella Sinev, 2001
- Scythris mixaula Meyrick, 1916
- Scythris nanophyti Falkovitsh, 1979
- Scythris neocompsa (Meyrick, 1933)
- Scythris nepalensis Bengtsson, 2005
- Scythris neurogramma Walsingham, 1900
- Scythris nigra Philpott, 1931
- Scythris nigrispersa Meyrick, 1918
- Scythris nigrogrammella Bengtsson, 2002
- Scythris nigropterella Bengtsson, 2002
- Scythris ninae Nupponen, 2003
- Scythris niphozela Meyrick, 1931
- Scythris nitidella Bengtsson & Liska, 1996
- Scythris nivicolor Meyrick, 1916
- Scythris notorrhoa Meyrick, 1921
- Scythris obliqua Falkovitsh, 1969
- Scythris ochrantha Meyrick, 1909
- Scythris ochrea Walsingham, 1896
- Scythris ochrogramma Meyrick, 1916
- Scythris olschwangi K. & T.Nupponen, 2000
- Scythris onerica Nupponen, 2009
- Scythris orientella Sinev, 2001
- Scythris oxyplecta Meyrick, 1916
- Scythris paelopyga Staudinger, 1880
- Scythris pallidella Passerin d'Entrèves & Roggero, 2006
- Scythris pamirica Passerin d'Entrèves & Roggero, 2008
- Scythris pangalactis Meyrick, 1933
- Scythris parachalca Meyrick, 1916
- Scythris parafluxilis Passerin d'Entrèves & Roggero, 2007
- Scythris paralogella Bengtsson, 2002
- Scythris paredra Meyrick, 1897
- Scythris parenthesella Bengtsson, 2002
- Scythris patiens Meyrick, 1921
- Scythris pectinicornis Walsingham, 1900
- Scythris pelinaula Meyrick, 1916
- Scythris pelochyta Meyrick, 1909
- Scythris persephone Meyrick, 1936
- Scythris pfeifferella Rebel, 1936
- Scythris pilosella (Zeller, 1873)
- Scythris pistillata Bucheli, 2005
- Scythris piratica Meyrick, 1928
- Scythris pleonectis Meyrick, 1897
- Scythris plocanota Meyrick, 1897
- Scythris plocogastra Meyrick, 1931
- Scythris plutelloidella Turati, 1934
- Scythris poliantha Meyrick, 1921
- Scythris pollicella Bengtsson, 2002
- Scythris potatorella Nupponen, 2003
- Scythris powelli (Landry, 1991)
- Scythris praematura Meyrick, 1937
- Scythris praestructa Meyrick, 1922
- Scythris pruinata Falkovitsh, 1972
- Scythris pterosaurella Bengtsson, 2002
- Scythris reflectella Bengtsson, 2002
- Scythris remexella K. Nupponen & Kaitila, 2000
- Scythris rhabducha Meyrick, 1897
- Scythris richteri Bengtsson, 2013
- Scythris rivigera Meyrick, 1911
- Scythris roseola Meyrick, 1912
- Scythris saarelai K. & T.Nupponen, 1999
- Scythris sacharissa Meyrick, 1913
- Scythris sachkovi Passerin d'Entrèves & Roggero, 2006
- Scythris sagitatella Erschoff, [1877]
- Scythris sanae Bengtsson, 2002
- Scythris sciochalca Meyrick, 1928
- Scythris scotinopa Meyrick, 1935
- Scythris scutulella Nupponen, 2013
- Scythris scyphella Bengtsson, 2002
- Scythris sibirella Sinev, 2001
- Scythris sinuosa Bucheli, 2005
- Scythris sinuosella Bengtsson, 2002
- Scythris sitarcha Meyrick, 1918
- Scythris strabella Bengtsson, 2002
- Scythris solitaria Diakonoff, 1955
- Scythris soluta Meyrick, 1916
- Scythris sophronia Meyrick, 1935
- Scythris sordidella Bengtsson, 2002
- Scythris spectatorella Nupponen, 2001
- Scythris spissata Meyrick, 1916
- Scythris sponsella (Busck, 1907)
- Scythris sporadica Meyrick, 1897
- Scythris spumifera Meyrick, 1918
- Scythris stagnosa Meyrick, 1913
- Scythris striella Turati, 1929
- Scythris subcassiterella Bengtsson, 1997
- Scythris subclavella Rebel, 1901
- Scythris subeburnea (Walsingham, 1891)
- Scythris subgaleatella Bengtsson, 2002
- Scythris sublaminella K. & T.Nupponen, 2000
- Scythris subparachalca Bengtsson, 2002
- Scythris subsignata Meyrick, 1916
- Scythris syrmatica Meyrick, 1916
- Scythris taizzae Bengtsson, 2002
- Scythris talyniella Passerin d'Entrèves & Roggero, 2006
- Scythris taurella Caradja, 1920
- Scythris tauromeniella Passerin d'Entrèves & Roggero, 2004
- Scythris taygeticola Scholz, 1997
- Scythris tenuisquamata Staudinger, 1880
- Scythris tephrella Bengtsson, 2005
- Scythris terekholensis Bengtsson, 1997
- Scythris tibicina Meyrick, 1916
- Scythris timoi Nupponen, 2009
- Scythris triatma Meyrick, 1936
- Scythris trinummulata Meyrick, 1922
- Scythris triochrias Meyrick, 1916
- Scythris trivinctella (Zeller, 1873)
- Scythris tsherkesella Falkovitsh, 1969
- Scythris turanica Nupponen, 2009
- Scythris tuzensis Bengtsson, 2005
- Scythris tytrella Falkovitsh, 1969
- Scythris unimaculella Rebel, 1905
- Scythris ustjuzhanini Sachkov & Sinev, 2001
- Scythris valgella Bengtsson, 2002
- Scythris valvaearcella Bengtsson, 2002
- Scythris vernusella Jäckh, 1978
- Scythris vogelfederbergensis (Mey, 2011)
- Scythris xenonympha (Lower, 1900)
- Scythris xylinochra Meyrick, 1931
- Scythris ypsilon Braun, 1920
- Scythris wadiqeltella Passerin d'Entrèves & Roggero, 2013
- Scythris zelleri (Staudinger, 1880)
- Scythris zeugmatica Meyrick, 1931

== Afrotropical ==
- Scythris aarviki Bengtsson, 2014
- Scythris abachausensis Bengtsson, 2014
- Scythris agassizi Bengtsson, 2014
- Scythris alainensis Bengtsson, 2014
- Scythris albipunctella Bengtsson, 2014
- Scythris albonigrella Bengtsson, 2014
- Scythris anaecapitella Bengtsson, 2014
- Scythris apicispinella Bengtsson, 2014
- Scythris aratrella Bengtsson, 2014
- Scythris asinella Bengtsson, 2014
- Scythris atroparvella Bengtsson, 2014
- Scythris aulaeella Bengtsson, 2014
- Scythris balantiella Bengtsson, 2014
- Scythris baringensis Bengtsson, 2014
- Scythris basimaculella Bengtsson, 2014
- Scythris bernardi Bengtsson, 2014
- Scythris bicalamella Bengtsson, 2014
- Scythris bipunctella Bengtsson, 2014
- Scythris bisacculella Bengtsson, 2014
- Scythris bisincusella Bengtsson, 2014
- Scythris bitterfonteinica Bengtsson, 2014
- Scythris bjoernstadi Bengtsson, 2014
- Scythris bontebokensis Bengtsson, 2014
- Scythris bosicornella Bengtsson, 2014
- Scythris brandbergensis Bengtsson, 2014
- Scythris brevimanubriella Bengtsson, 2014
- Scythris bromiella Bengtsson, 2014
- Scythris brunneostriella Bengtsson, 2014
- Scythris budongensis Bengtsson, 2014
- Scythris capilliverticella Bengtsson, 2014
- Scythris catuliformis Bengtsson, 2014
- Scythris cederbergensis Bengtsson, 2014
- Scythris clarki Bengtsson, 2014
- Scythris claudioculella Bengtsson, 2014
- Scythris conimarginella Bengtsson, 2014
- Scythris coniobliquella Bengtsson, 2014
- Scythris cooperi Bengtsson, 2014
- Scythris coriella Bengtsson, 2014
- Scythris cottrelli Bengtsson, 2014
- Scythris cricetinaeformis Bengtsson, 2014
- Scythris davidi Bengtsson, 2014
- Scythris dicksoni Bengtsson, 2014
- Scythris dorsifuscella Bengtsson, 2014
- Scythris durbanensis Bengtsson, 2014
- Scythris eburiplicella Bengtsson, 2014
- Scythris eburnella Bengtsson, 2014
- Scythris eburnipterella Bengtsson, 2014
- Scythris ellipsiella Bengtsson, 2014
- Scythris enigmella Bengtsson, 2014
- Scythris ethiopica Bengtsson, 2014
- Scythris etoshensis Bengtsson, 2014
- Scythris falciformis Bengtsson, 2014
- Scythris flavoterminella Bengtsson, 2014
- Scythris fumarolella Bengtsson, 2014
- Scythris gaboronensis Bengtsson, 2014
- Scythris geminella Bengtsson, 2014
- Scythris gielisi Bengtsson, 2014
- Scythris gilgilensis Bengtsson, 2014
- Scythris griseella Bengtsson, 2014
- Scythris hanseni Bengtsson, 2014
- Scythris helskloofensis Bengtsson, 2014
- Scythris heniaeguttella Bengtsson, 2014
- Scythris hermanusensis Bengtsson, 2014
- Scythris hirudoformis Bengtsson, 2014
- Scythris humeriformis Bengtsson, 2014
- Scythris jacobseni Bengtsson, 2014
- Scythris jamakensis Bengtsson, 2014
- Scythris jansei Bengtsson, 2014
- Scythris jodhpursoides Bengtsson, 2016
- Scythris jurateae Bengtsson, 2014
- Scythris kalaharii Bengtsson, 2014
- Scythris kalkrandensis Bengtsson, 2014
- Scythris kavangensis Bengtsson, 2014
- Scythris kihondensis Bengtsson, 2014
- Scythris kilifiensis Bengtsson, 2014
- Scythris kingstoni Bengtsson, 2014
- Scythris krooni Bengtsson, 2014
- Scythris kruegeri Bengtsson, 2014
- Scythris lactifuscella Bengtsson, 2014
- Scythris lahaivora Bengtsson, 2014
- Scythris leifi Bengtsson, 2014
- Scythris lushotensis Bengtsson, 2014
- Scythris magnipedella Bengtsson, 2014
- Scythris malawica Bengtsson, 2014
- Scythris malelanensis Bengtsson, 2014
- Scythris marginifuscella Bengtsson, 2014
- Scythris matopensis Bengtsson, 2014
- Scythris messinensis Bengtsson, 2014
- Scythris meyeri Bengtsson, 2014
- Scythris meyi Bengtsson, 2014
- Scythris mpalensis Bengtsson, 2014
- Scythris mulanjensis Bengtsson, 2014
- Scythris munroi Bengtsson, 2014
- Scythris naivashensis Bengtsson, 2014
- Scythris najaoides Bengtsson, 2014
- Scythris naukluftensis Bengtsson, 2014
- Scythris nguliae Bengtsson, 2014
- Scythris niniae Bengtsson, 2014
- Scythris nussi Bengtsson, 2014
- Scythris nyangensis Bengtsson, 2014
- Scythris nyikensis Bengtsson, 2014
- Scythris nylstroomensis Bengtsson, 2014
- Scythris nylsvleyensis Bengtsson, 2014
- Scythris obnubilella Bengtsson, 2014
- Scythris ochrocrusella Bengtsson, 2014
- Scythris ochroplicella Bengtsson, 2014
- Scythris octocornella Bengtsson, 2014
- Scythris oculella Bengtsson, 2014
- Scythris otaviensis Bengtsson, 2014
- Scythris paarlensis Bengtsson, 2014
- Scythris palmwagensis Bengtsson, 2014
- Scythris piriensis Bengtsson, 2014
- Scythris piriformis Bengtsson, 2014
- Scythris popensis Bengtsson, 2014
- Scythris potgieteri Bengtsson, 2014
- Scythris pravitella Bengtsson, 2014
- Scythris pretoriensis Bengtsson, 2014
- Scythris pulveratella Bengtsson, 2014
- Scythris quadrilobella Bengtsson, 2014
- Scythris rumurutiensis Bengtsson, 2014
- Scythris satarensis Bengtsson, 2014
- Scythris scholzi Bengtsson, 2014
- Scythris schouteni Bengtsson, 2014
- Scythris sericiella Bengtsson, 2014
- Scythris serinusoides Bengtsson, 2014
- Scythris setaelongella Bengtsson, 2014
- Scythris shingwedziensis Bengtsson, 2014
- Scythris silfverbergi Bengtsson, 2014
- Scythris simplicella Bengtsson, 2014
- Scythris skukuzensis Bengtsson, 2014
- Scythris snymani Bengtsson, 2014
- Scythris solutella Bengtsson, 2014
- Scythris somangensis Bengtsson, 2014
- Scythris stoltzei Bengtsson, 2014
- Scythris strydomi Bengtsson, 2014
- Scythris subconcurrens Bengtsson, 2014
- Scythris subcurvipilella Bengtsson, 2014
- Scythris subgriseella Bengtsson, 2014
- Scythris subnigropterella Bengtsson, 2014
- Scythris subroseola Bengtsson, 2014
- Scythris thikensis Bengtsson, 2014
- Scythris thoracifaciella Bengtsson, 2014
- Scythris tubulella Bengtsson, 2014
- Scythris turiensis Bengtsson, 2014
- Scythris ugabensis Bengtsson, 2014
- Scythris ugandica Bengtsson, 2014
- Scythris umtaliensis Bengtsson, 2014
- Scythris unciclavella Bengtsson, 2014
- Scythris valvaerimella Bengtsson, 2014
- Scythris vanderwolfi Bengtsson, 2014
- Scythris varii Bengtsson, 2014
- Scythris virgaeformis Bengtsson, 2014
- Scythris wankiensis Bengtsson, 2014
- Scythris waterbergensis Bengtsson, 2014
- Scythris wolframi Bengtsson, 2014
- Scythris worcesterensis Bengtsson, 2014
- Scythris zimbabwensis Bengtsson, 2014

== Selected former species ==
- Scythris ammobia Falkovitsh, 1972
- Scythris annae Bengtsson, 1997
- Scythris aphanatma Meyrick, 1933
- Scythris asema Falkovitsh, 1972
- Scythris asthena Falkovitsh, 1972
- Scythris badiella Bengtsson, 2002
- Scythris calciflua Meyrick, 1921
- Scythris canispersa Meyrick, 1913
- Scythris erudita Meyrick, 1917
- Scythris fluctuosa Meyrick, 1914
- Scythris homoxantha Meyrick, 1921
- Scythris hypolepta Falkovitsh, 1972
- Scythris melanopleura Meyrick, 1914
- Scythris meligastra Meyrick, 1920
- Scythris mongholica Passerin d'Entrèves & Roggero, 2006
- Scythris pediculella Bengtsson, 1997
- Scythris physalis Falkovitsh, 1972
- Scythris psamathota Meyrick, 1913
- Scythris zylinochra Meyrick, 1931
