= Scythris sciochalca =

Scientific classification
- Kingdom: Animalia
- Phylum: Arthropoda
- Class: Insecta
- Order: Lepidoptera
- Family: Scythrididae
- Genus: Scythris
- Species: S. sciochalca

Binomial name
- Scythris sciochalca Meyrick, 1928

Species of moth

Scythris sciochalca is a moth of the family Scythrididae. It was described by Edward Meyrick in 1928. It is found in Uganda.

The wingspan is about 12 mm. The forewings are greyish-bronzy and the hindwings are dark grey.
