= Scythris tephrella =

Scientific classification
- Kingdom: Animalia
- Phylum: Arthropoda
- Clade: Pancrustacea
- Class: Insecta
- Order: Lepidoptera
- Family: Scythrididae
- Genus: Scythris
- Species: S. tephrella

Binomial name
- Scythris tephrella Bengtsson, 2005

Species of moth

Scythris tephrella is a moth of the family Scythrididae. It was described by Bengt Å. Bengtsson in 2005. It is found in Saudi Arabia and Yemen.

The wingspan is 12–13 mm.
