= Scythris maroccensis =

Scientific classification
- Kingdom: Animalia
- Phylum: Arthropoda
- Class: Insecta
- Order: Lepidoptera
- Family: Scythrididae
- Genus: Scythris
- Species: S. maroccensis

Binomial name
- Scythris maroccensis Jäckh, 1977

Species of moth

Scythris maroccensis is a moth of the family Scythrididae. It was described by Eberhard Jäckh in 1977. It is found in Morocco.
