= Scythris cirra =

Scientific classification
- Kingdom: Animalia
- Phylum: Arthropoda
- Class: Insecta
- Order: Lepidoptera
- Family: Scythrididae
- Genus: Scythris
- Species: S. cirra

Binomial name
- Scythris cirra Falkovitsh, 1969

Species of moth

Scythris cirra is a moth of the family Scythrididae. It was described by Mark I. Falkovitsh in 1969. It is found in Kazakhstan, Kyrgyzstan, Mongolia, Turkmenistan and Uzbekistan.
