= Scythris latebrosa =

Scientific classification
- Kingdom: Animalia
- Phylum: Arthropoda
- Class: Insecta
- Order: Lepidoptera
- Family: Scythrididae
- Genus: Scythris
- Species: S. latebrosa

Binomial name
- Scythris latebrosa Meyrick, 1913

Species of moth

Scythris latebrosa is a moth of the family Scythrididae. It was described by Edward Meyrick in 1913. It is found in Mpumalanga, South Africa.

The wingspan is 10–11 mm. The forewings are dark greyish bronze. The submedian fold is irregularly strewn with obscure grey-whitish scales, with indistinct small cloudy dark fuscous spots before the middle of the wing and midway between this and the base. The hindwings are dark fuscous.
