= Scythris ejiciens =

Scientific classification
- Kingdom: Animalia
- Phylum: Arthropoda
- Class: Insecta
- Order: Lepidoptera
- Family: Scythrididae
- Genus: Scythris
- Species: S. ejiciens

Binomial name
- Scythris ejiciens Meyrick, 1928

Species of moth

Scythris ejiciens is a moth of the family Scythrididae. It was described by Edward Meyrick in 1928. It is found in Peru.

The wingspan is about 9 mm. The forewings are rather dark purplish-fuscous with a whitish-ochreous streak along the fold from the base to beyond the middle of the wing and a roundish whitish-ochreous spot in the disc at three-fourths. The hindwings are dark grey.
