= Scythris lycii =

Scientific classification
- Kingdom: Animalia
- Phylum: Arthropoda
- Class: Insecta
- Order: Lepidoptera
- Family: Scythrididae
- Genus: Scythris
- Species: S. lycii

Binomial name
- Scythris lycii Falkovitsh, 1969

Species of moth

Scythris lycii is a moth species of the family Scythrididae. It was described by Mark I. Falkovitsh in 1969. It is found in Turkmenistan and Uzbekistan.
