= Scythris aenea =

Scientific classification
- Kingdom: Animalia
- Phylum: Arthropoda
- Class: Insecta
- Order: Lepidoptera
- Family: Scythrididae
- Genus: Scythris
- Species: S. aenea

Binomial name
- Scythris aenea Passerin d'Entrèves, 1984

Species of moth

Scythris aenea is a moth of the family Scythrididae. It was described by Passerin d'Entrèves in 1984. It is found in Spain.

== Etymology ==
The species name refers to the bronzy color of the body.
