= Scythris reticulella =

Scientific classification
- Kingdom: Animalia
- Phylum: Arthropoda
- Clade: Pancrustacea
- Class: Insecta
- Order: Lepidoptera
- Family: Scythrididae
- Genus: Scythris
- Species: S. reticulella

Binomial name
- Scythris reticulella Nupponen, 2010

Species of moth

Scythris reticulella is a moth of the family Scythrididae. It was described by Kari Nupponen in 2010. It is found in Uzbekistan. The habitat consists of alpine meadows.

The wingspan is 10.5–11.5 mm (0.41–0.45 in).
