= Scythris digitibasella =

Scientific classification
- Kingdom: Animalia
- Phylum: Arthropoda
- Clade: Pancrustacea
- Class: Insecta
- Order: Lepidoptera
- Family: Scythrididae
- Genus: Scythris
- Species: S. digitibasella

Binomial name
- Scythris digitibasella Nupponen & Saldaitis, 2013

Species of moth

Scythris digitibasella is a moth of the family Scythrididae. It was described by Kari Nupponen and Aidas Saldaitis in 2013. It is found in Yemen (Socotra).
