= Scythris jodhpursoides =

Scientific classification
- Kingdom: Animalia
- Phylum: Arthropoda
- Clade: Pancrustacea
- Class: Insecta
- Order: Lepidoptera
- Family: Scythrididae
- Genus: Scythris
- Species: S. jodhpursoides

Binomial name
- Scythris jodhpursoides Bengtsson, 2016

Synonyms
- Scythris ridiculella Bengtsson, 2014 (preocc. Caradja, 1920)

Species of moth

Scythris jodhpursoides is a moth of the family Scythrididae. It was described by Bengt Å. Bengtsson in 2016. It is found in Kenya.
