= List of moths of Yemen =

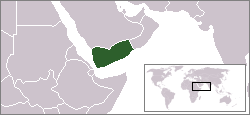
Location of Yemen

There are about 550 known moth species of Yemen. The moths (mostly nocturnal) and butterflies (mostly diurnal) together make up the taxonomic order Lepidoptera.

This is a list of moth species which have been recorded in Yemen.

== Alucitidae ==
- Alucita nannodactyla (Rebel, 1907)

== Arctiidae ==
- Amatula kikiae Wiltshire, 1983
- Creataloum arabicum (Hampson, 1896)
- Creatonotos leucanioides Holland, 1893
- Eilema sokotrensis (Hampson, 1900)
- Nyctemera torbeni Wiltshire, 1983
- Secusio strigata Walker, 1854
- Siccia butvilai Ivinskis & Saldaitis, 2008
- Spilosoma yemenensis (Hampson, 1916)
- Utetheisa lotrix (Cramer, 1779)
- Utetheisa pulchella (Linnaeus, 1758)

== Autostichidae ==
- Hesperesta arabica Gozmány, 2000
- Turatia argillacea Gozmány, 2000
- Turatia striatula Gozmány, 2000
- Turatia yemenensis Derra, 2008

== Choreutidae ==
- Choreutis aegyptiaca (Zeller, 1867)

== Coleophoridae ==
- Ishnophanes bifucata Baldizzone, 1994
- Coleophora aegyptiacae Walsingham, 1907
- Coleophora eilatica Baldizzone, 1994
- Coleophora himyarita Baldizzone, 2007
- Coleophora jerusalemella Toll, 1942
- Coleophora lasloella Baldizzone, 1982
- Coleophora longiductella Baldizzone, 1989
- Coleophora recula Baldizzone, 2007
- Coleophora sabaea Baldizzone, 2007
- Coleophora semicinerea Staudinger, 1859
- Coleophora sudanella Rebel, 1916
- Coleophora taizensis Baldizzone, 2007
- Coleophora yemenita Baldizzone, 2007

== Cosmopterigidae ==
- Alloclita gambiella (Walsingham, 1891)

== Cossidae ==
- Aethalopteryx diksami Yakovlev & Saldaitis, 2010
- Azygophleps larseni Yakovlev & Saldaitis, 2011
- Azygophleps sheikh Yakovlev & Saldaitis, 2011
- Meharia acuta Wiltshire, 1982
- Meharia philbyi Bradley, 1952
- Meharia hackeri Saldaitis, Ivinskis & Yakovlev, 2011
- Meharia semilactea (Warren & Rothschild, 1905)
- Meharia yakovlevi Saldaitis & Ivinskis, 2010
- Mormogystia brandstetteri Saldaitis, Ivinskis & Yakovlev, 2011
- Mormogystia proleuca (Hampson in Walsingham & Hampson, 1896)
- Paropta frater Warnecke, 1930

== Crambidae ==
- Achyra nudalis (Hübner, 1796)
- Amselia leucozonellus (Hampson, 1896)
- Ancylolomia chrysographellus (Kollar, 1844)
- Antigastra catalaunalis (Duponchel, 1833)
- Aplectropus leucopis Hampson, 1896
- Autocharis fessalis (Swinhoe, 1886)
- Bocchoris inspersalis (Zeller, 1852)
- Bocchoris onychinalis (Guenée, 1854)
- Cotachena smaragdina (Butler, 1875)
- Cybalomia albilinealis (Hampson, 1896)
- Diaphana indica (Saunders, 1851)
- Dolicharthria paediusalis (Walker, 1859)
- Eoophyla peribocalis (Walker, 1859)
- Euchromius ocellea (Haworth, 1811)
- Euclasta varii Popescu-Gorj & Constantinescu, 1973
- Heliothela ophideresana (Walker, 1863)
- Hellula undalis (Fabricius, 1781)
- Herpetogramma licarsisalis (Walker, 1859)
- Hodebertia testalis (Fabricius, 1794)
- Lamprosema inglorialis Hampson, 1918
- Loxostege albifascialis (Hampson, 1896)
- Metasia profanalis (Walker, 1865)
- Noctuelia floralis (Hübner, [1809])
- Nomophila noctuella ([Denis & Schiffermüller], 1775)
- Noorda blitealis Walker, 1859
- Palepicorsia ustrinalis (Christoph, 1877)
- Palpita unionalis (Hübner, 1796)
- Ptychopseustis pavonialis (Hampson, 1896)
- Pyrausta arabica Butler, 1884
- Spoladea recurvalis (Fabricius, 1775)
- Synclera traducalis (Zeller, 1852)
- Tegostoma bipartalis Hampson, 1896
- Tegostoma comparalis (Hübner, 1796)
- Thyridiphora furia (Swinhoe, 1884)

== Galacticidae ==
- Galactica inornata (Walsingham, 1900)
- Homadaula maritima Mey, 2007
- Homadaula montana Mey, 2007
- Homadaula submontana Mey, 2007

== Gelechiidae ==
- Anarsia acaciae Walsingham, 1896
- Parapsectris amseli (Povolny, 1981)
- Phthorimaea molitor (Walsingham, 1896)
- Sitotroga cerealella (Olivier, 1789)

== Geometridae ==
- Acidaliastis micra Hampson, 1896
- Brachyglossina tibbuana Herbulot, 1965
- Casilda kikiae (Wiltshire, 1982)
- Charissa lequatrei (Herbulot, 1988)
- Cleora rostella D. S. Fletcher, 1967
- Cyclophora staudei Hausmann, 2006
- Disclisioprocta natalata (Walker, 1862)
- Eucrostes disparata Walker, 1861
- Glossotrophia jacta (Swinhoe, 1884)
- Idaea granulosa (Warren & Rothschild, 1905)
- Idaea illustrior (Wiltshire, 1952)
- Idaea tahamae Wiltshire, 1983
- Idaea testacea Swinhoe, 1885
- Isturgia catalaunaria (Guenée, 1858)
- Isturgia disputaria (Guenée, 1858)
- Isturgia sublimbata (Butler, 1885)
- Neromia pulvereisparsa (Hampson, 1896)
- Oar pratana (Fabricius, 1794)
- Omphacodes directa (Walker, 1861)
- Pseudosterrha rufistrigata (Hampson, 1896)
- Scopula actuaria (Walker, 1861)
- Scopula rufinubes (Warren, 1900)
- Traminda mundissima (Walker, 1861)
- Zamarada anacantha D. S. Fletcher, 1974
- Zamarada latilimbata Rebel, 1948
- Zamarada minimaria Swinhoe, 1895
- Zamarada torrida D. S. Fletcher, 1974
- Zygophyxia retracta Hausmann, 2006

== Gracillariidae ==
- Phyllocnistis citrella Stainton, 1856
- Phyllonorycter aarviki de Prins, 2012
- Phyllonorycter grewiella (Vári, 1961)
- Phyllonorycter maererei de Prins, 2012
- Phyllonorycter mida de Prins, 2012

== Hyblaeidae ==
- Hyblaea puera (Cramer, 1777)

== Lasiocampidae ==
- Braura desdemona Zolotuhin & Gurkovich, 2009
- Odontocheilopteryx myxa Wallengren, 1860

== Limacodidae ==
- Parasa fulvicorpus Hampson, 1896

== Lymantriidae ==
- Euproctis erythrosticta (Hampson, 1910)
- Knappetra fasciata (Walker, 1855)

== Micronoctuidae ==
- Micronola wadicola Amsel, 1935
- Micronola yemeni Fibiger, 2011

== Noctuidae ==
- Acantholipes aurea Berio, 1966
- Acantholipes canofusca Hacker & Saldaitis, 2010
- Acantholipes circumdata (Walker, 1858)
- Achaea catella Guenée, 1852
- Achaea finita (Guenée, 1852)
- Achaea lienardi (Boisduval, 1833)
- Achaea mercatoria (Fabricius, 1775)
- Acontia akbar Wiltshire, 1985
- Acontia albarabica Wiltshire, 1994
- Acontia antica Walker, 1862
- Acontia basifera Walker, 1857
- Acontia binominata (Butler, 1892)
- Acontia chiaromontei Berio, 1936
- Acontia crassivalva (Wiltshire, 1947)
- Acontia dichroa (Hampson, 1914)
- Acontia hoppei Hacker, Legrain & Fibiger, 2008
- Acontia hortensis Swinhoe, 1884
- Acontia imitatrix Wallengren, 1856
- Acontia insocia (Walker, 1857)
- Acontia karachiensis Swinhoe, 1889
- Acontia lactea Hacker, Legrain & Fibiger, 2008
- Acontia manakhana Hacker, Legrain & Fibiger, 2010
- Acontia melaena (Hampson, 1899)
- Acontia minuscula Hacker, Legrain & Fibiger, 2010
- Acontia mukalla Hacker, Legrain & Fibiger, 2008
- Acontia opalinoides Guenée, 1852
- Acontia peksi Hacker, Legrain & Fibiger, 2008
- Acontia philbyi Wiltshire, 1988
- Acontia porphyrea (Butler, 1898)
- Acontia transfigurata Wallengren, 1856
- Acontia trimaculata Aurivillius, 1879
- Acontia yemenensis (Hampson, 1918)
- Aegocera bettsi Wiltshire, 1988
- Aegocera brevivitta Hampson, 1901
- Aegocera rectilinea Boisduval, 1836
- Agoma trimenii (Felder, 1874)
- Agrotis acronycta (Rebel, 1907)
- Agrotis biconica Kollar, 1844
- Agrotis brachypecten Hampson, 1899
- Agrotis herzogi Rebel, 1911
- Agrotis ipsilon (Hufnagel, 1766)
- Agrotis medioatra Hampson, 1918
- Agrotis segetum ([Denis & Schiffermüller], 1775)
- Agrotis sesamioides (Rebel, 1907)
- Aletia consanguis (Guenée, 1852)
- Amefrontia purpurea Hampson, 1899
- Amyna axis Guenée, 1852
- Amyna delicata Wiltshire, 1994
- Amyna punctum (Fabricius, 1794)
- Anarta endemica Hacker & Saldaitis, 2010
- Anarta trifolii (Hufnagel, 1766)
- Androlymnia clavata Hampson, 1910
- Anoba socotrensis Hampson, 1926
- Anoba triangularis (Warnecke, 1938)
- Anomis erosa (Hübner, 1818)
- Anomis flava (Fabricius, 1775)
- Anomis mesogona (Walker, 1857)
- Anomis sabulifera (Guenée, 1852)
- Antarchaea conicephala (Staudinger, 1870)
- Antarchaea digramma (Walker, 1863)
- Antarchaea erubescens (Bang-Haas, 1910)
- Antarchaea flavissima Hacker & Saldaitis, 2010
- Antarchaea fragilis (Butler, 1875)
- Anticarsia rubricans (Boisduval, 1833)
- Anumeta atrosignata Walker, 1858
- Anumeta spilota (Erschoff, 1874)
- Argyrogramma signata (Fabricius, 1775)
- Asplenia melanodonta (Hampson, 1896)
- Athetis partita (Walker, 1857)
- Attatha metaleuca Hampson, 1913
- Aucha polyphaenoides (Wiltshire, 1961)
- Autoba abrupta (Walker, 1865)
- Autoba admota (Felder & Rogenhofer, 1874)
- Brevipecten bischofi Hacker & Fibiger, 2007
- Brevipecten biscornuta Wiltshire, 1985
- Brevipecten calimanii (Berio, 1939)
- Brevipecten confluens Hampson, 1926
- Brevipecten hypocornuta Hacker & Fibiger, 2007
- Brevipecten marmoreata Hacker & Fibiger, 2007
- Brevipecten tihamae Hacker & Fibiger, 2007
- Brithys crini (Fabricius, 1775)
- Callopistria latreillei (Duponchel, 1827)
- Callopistria maillardi (Guenée, 1862)
- Callopistria yerburii Butler, 1884
- Callyna gaedei Hacker & Fibiger, 2006
- Calophasia platyptera (Esper, [1788])
- Caradrina soudanensis (Hampson, 1918)
- Caranilla uvarovi (Wiltshire, 1949)
- Carcharoda yemenicola Wiltshire, 1983
- Catamecia minima (Swinhoe, 1889)
- Cerocala sokotrensis Hampson, 1899
- Chasmina vestae (Guenée, 1852)
- Chrysodeixis acuta (Walker, [1858])
- Chrysodeixis chalcites (Esper, 1789)
- Clytie devia (Swinhoe, 1884)
- Clytie infrequens (Swinhoe, 1884)
- Clytie sancta (Staudinger, 1900)
- Clytie tropicalis Rungs, 1975
- Condica capensis (Guenée, 1852)
- Condica conducta (Walker, 1857)
- Condica illecta Walker, 1865
- Condica pauperata (Walker, 1858)
- Condica viscosa (Freyer, 1831)
- Cortyta canescens Walker, 1858
- Ctenoplusia dorfmeisteri (Felder & Rogenhofer, 1874)
- Ctenoplusia fracta (Walker, 1857)
- Ctenoplusia limbirena (Guenée, 1852)
- Ctenoplusia phocea (Hampson, 1910)
- Cyligramma latona (Cramer, 1775)
- Diparopsis watersi (Rothschild, 1901)
- Drasteria kabylaria (Bang-Haas, 1906)
- Drasteria yerburyi (Butler, 1892)
- Dysgonia algira (Linnaeus, 1767)
- Dysgonia angularis (Boisduval, 1833)
- Dysgonia torrida (Guenée, 1852)
- Dysmilichia flavonigra (Swinhoe, 1884)
- Epharmottomena albiluna (Hampson, 1899)
- Epharmottomena sublimbata Berio, 1894
- Ericeia congregata (Walker, 1858)
- Eublemma anachoresis (Wallengren, 1863)
- Eublemma baccalix (Swinhoe, 1886)
- Eublemma bifasciata (Moore, 1881)
- Eublemma bulla (Swinhoe, 1884)
- Eublemma cochylioides (Guenée, 1852)
- Eublemma cornutus Fibiger & Hacker, 2004
- Eublemma ecthaemata Hampson, 1896
- Eublemma gayneri (Rothschild, 1901)
- Eublemma khonoides Wiltshire, 1980
- Eublemma odontophora Hampson, 1910
- Eublemma parva (Hübner, [1808])
- Eublemma scitula (Rambur, 1833)
- Eublemma seminivea Hampson, 1896
- Eublemma subflavipes Hacker & Saldaitis, 2010
- Eublemma thermobasis Hampson, 1910
- Eublemmoides apicimacula (Mabille, 1880)
- Eudocima materna (Linnaeus, 1767)
- Eulocastra alfierii Wiltshire, 1948
- Eulocastra diaphora (Staudinger, 1878)
- Eulocastra insignis (Butler, 1884)
- Eutelia amatrix Walker, 1858
- Eutelia bowkeri (Felder & Rogenhofer, 1874)
- Eutelia discitriga Walker, 1865
- Eutelia polychorda Hampson, 1902
- Feliniopsis africana (Schaus & Clements, 1893)
- Feliniopsis connivens (Felder & Rogenhofer, 1874)
- Feliniopsis consummata (Walker, 1857)
- Feliniopsis hosplitoides (Laporte, 1979)
- Feliniopsis minnecii (Berio, 1939)
- Feliniopsis opposita (Walker, 1865)
- Feliniopsis sabaea Hacker & Fibiger, 2001
- Feliniopsis talhouki (Wiltshire, 1983)
- Feliniopsis viettei Hacker & Fibiger, 2001
- Fodina legrainei Hacker & Saldaitis, 2010
- Gesonia obeditalis Walker, 1859
- Gnamptonyx innexa (Walker, 1858)
- Grammodes exclusiva Pagenstecher, 1907
- Grammodes stolida (Fabricius, 1775)
- Hadjina tyriobaphes Wiltshire, 1983
- Helicoverpa armigera (Hübner, [1808])
- Helicoverpa assulta (Guenée, 1852)
- Heliothis nubigera Herrich-Schäffer, 1851
- Heliothis peltigera ([Denis & Schiffermüller], 1775)
- Heteropalpia acrosticta (Püngeler, 1904)
- Heteropalpia exarata (Mabille, 1890)
- Heteropalpia robusta Wiltshire, 1988
- Heteropalpia rosacea (Rebel, 1907)
- Heteropalpia vetusta (Walker, 1865)
- Hiccoda dosaroides Moore, 1882
- Hipoepa fractalis (Guenée, 1854)
- Honeyia clearchus (Fawcett, 1916)
- Hypena abyssinialis Guenée, 1854
- Hypena laceratalis Walker, 1859
- Hypena lividalis (Hübner, 1790)
- Hypena obacerralis Walker, [1859]
- Hypena obsitalis (Hübner, [1813])
- Hypena senialis Guenée, 1854
- Hypocala rostrata (Fabricius, 1794)
- Hypotacha indecisa Walker, [1858]
- Hypotacha isthmigera Wiltshire, 1968
- Hypotacha ochribasalis (Hampson, 1896)
- Hypotacha raffaldii Berio, 1939
- Iambiodes incerta (Rothschild, 1913)
- Iambiodes postpallida Wiltshire, 1977
- Idia fumosa (Hampson, 1896)
- Leucania loreyi (Duponchel, 1827)
- Lophoptera arabica Hacker & Fibiger, 2006
- Lyncestoides kruegeri (Hacker & Fibiger, 2006)
- Lyncestoides unilinea (Swinhoe, 1885)
- Marathyssa cuneata (Saalmüller, 1891)
- Matopo socotrensis Hacker & Saldaitis, 2010
- Maxera marchalii (Boisduval, 1833)
- Maxera nigriceps (Walker, 1858)
- Melanephia nigrescens (Wallengren, 1856)
- Metachrostis quinaria (Moore, 1881)
- Metachrostis subvelox Hacker & Saldaitis, 2010
- Metopoceras kneuckeri (Rebel, 1903)
- Mocis frugalis (Fabricius, 1775)
- Mocis mayeri (Boisduval, 1833)
- Mocis proverai Zilli, 2000
- Mocis repanda (Fabricius, 1794)
- Mythimna diopis (Hampson, 1905)
- Mythimna languida (Walker, 1858)
- Mythimna sokotrensis Hreblay, 1996
- Mythimna umbrigera (Saalmüller, 1891)
- Mythimna unipuncta (Haworth, 1809)
- Nagia natalensis (Hampson, 1902)
- Nimasia brachyura Wiltshire, 1982
- Ophiusa dianaris (Guenée, 1852)
- Ophiusa mejanesi (Guenée, 1852)
- Ophiusa tirhaca (Cramer, 1777)
- Oraesia emarginata (Fabricius, 1794)
- Oraesia intrusa (Krüger, 1939)
- Oraesia isolata Hacker & Saldaitis, 2010
- Ozarba atrifera Hampson, 1910
- Ozarba nyanza (Felder & Rogenhofer, 1874)
- Ozarba perplexa Saalmüller, 1891
- Ozarba simplex (Rebel, 1907)
- Ozarba socotrana Hampson, 1910
- Ozarba terminipuncta (Hampson, 1899)
- Ozarba varia (Walker, 1865)
- Pandesma quenavadi Guenée, 1852
- Pandesma robusta (Walker, 1858)
- Pericyma mendax (Walker, 1858)
- Pericyma metaleuca Hampson, 1913
- Phytometra subflavalis (Walker, 1865)
- Plecoptera butkevicii Hacker & Saldaitis, 2010
- Plusiopalpa dichora Holland, 1894
- Polydesma umbricola Boisduval, 1833
- Polytela cliens (Felder & Rogenhofer, 1874)
- Prionofrontia ochrosia Hampson, 1926
- Pseudomicrodes decolor Rebel, 1907
- Pseudozarba mesozona (Hampson, 1896)
- Rhabdophera clathrum (Guenée, 1852)
- Rhesala moestalis (Walker, 1866)
- Rhynchina albiscripta Hampson, 1916
- Rhynchina coniodes Vári, 1962
- Sesamia nonagrioides (Lefèbvre, 1827)
- Simplicia extinctalis (Zeller, 1852)
- Simplicia robustalis Guenée, 1854
- Simyra confusa (Walker, 1856)
- Sphingomorpha chlorea (Cramer, 1777)
- Spodoptera cilium Guenée, 1852
- Spodoptera exempta (Walker, 1857)
- Spodoptera exigua (Hübner, 1808)
- Spodoptera littoralis (Boisduval, 1833)
- Spodoptera mauritia (Boisduval, 1833)
- Stenosticta grisea Hampson, 1912
- Stenosticta sibensis Wiltshire, 1977
- Stenosticta wiltshirei Hacker, Saldaitis & Ivinskis, 2010
- Syngrapha circumflexa (Linnaeus, 1767)
- Tathorhynchus exsiccata (Lederer, 1855)
- Tathorhynchus stenoptera (Rebel, 1907)
- Thiacidas cerurodes (Hampson, 1916)
- Thiacidas roseotincta (Pinhey, 1962)
- Thysanoplusia chalcedona (Hampson, 1902)
- Thysanoplusia cupreomicans (Hampson, 1909)
- Thysanoplusia exquisita (Felder & Rogenhofer, 1874)
- Thysanoplusia rostrata (D. S. Fletcher, 1963)
- Thysanoplusia sestertia (Felder & Rogenhofer, 1874)
- Thysanoplusia tetrastigma (Hampson, 1910)
- Trichoplusia ni (Hübner, [1803])
- Trichoplusia orichalcea (Fabricius, 1775)
- Trigonodes hyppasia (Cramer, 1779)
- Tytroca balnearia (Distant, 1898)
- Tytroca leucoptera (Hampson, 1896)
- Ulotrichopus stertzi (Püngeler, 1907)
- Ulotrichopus tinctipennis (Hampson, 1902)
- Vittaplusia vittata (Wallengren, 1856)

== Nolidae ==
- Archinola pyralidia Hampson, 1896
- Bryophilopsis tarachoides Mabille, 1900
- Churia gallagheri Wiltshire, 1985
- Earias biplaga Walker, 1866
- Earias cupreoviridis (Walker, 1862)
- Earias insulana (Boisduval, 1833)
- Giaura dakkaki Wiltshire, 1986
- Negeta luminosa (Walker, 1858)
- Nola pumila Snellen, 1875
- Nola socotrensis (Hampson, 1901)
- Odontestis murina Wiltshire, 1988
- Odontestis socotrensis Hacker & Saldaitis, 2010
- Odontestis striata Hampson, 1912
- Pardasena minorella Walker, 1866
- Pardasena virgulana (Mabille, 1880)
- Pardoxia graellsii (Feisthamel, 1837)
- Selepa celtis (Moore, 1858)
- Xanthodes albago (Fabricius, 1794)
- Xanthodes brunnescens (Pinhey, 1968)
- Xanthodes gephyrias (Meyrick, 1902)

== Notodontidae ==
- Macrosenta purpurascens Hacker, Fibiger & Schreier, 2007

== Oecophoridae ==
- Stathmopoda diplaspis (Meyrick, 1887)

== Plutellidae ==
- Genostele renigera Walsingham, 1900
- Paraxenistis africana Mey, 2007
- Plutella xylostella (Linnaeus, 1758)

== Pterophoridae ==
- Agdistis adenensis Amsel, 1961
- Agdistis arabica Amsel, 1958
- Agdistis bellissima Arenberger, 1975
- Agdistis cathae Arenberger, 1999
- Agdistis hakimah Arenberger, 1985
- Agdistis insidiatrix Meyrick, 1933
- Agdistis minima Walsingham, 1900
- Agdistis nanodes Meyrick, 1906
- Agdistis obstinata Meyrick, 1920
- Agdistis riftvalleyi Arenberger, 2001
- Agdistis tamaricis (Zeller, 1847)
- Agdistis tenera Arenberger, 1976
- Agdistis tihamae Arenberger, 1999
- Agdistis yemenica Arenberger, 1999
- Arcoptilia gizan Arenberger, 1985
- Deuterocopus socotranus Rebel, 1907
- Diacrotricha lanceatus (Arenberger, 1986)
- Emmelina monodactyla (Linnaeus, 1758)
- Exelastis ebalensis (Rebel, 1907)
- Hellinsia bawana Arenberger, 2010
- Megalorhipida angusta Arenberger, 2002
- Megalorhipida fissa Arenberger, 2002
- Megalorhipida leptomeres (Meyrick, 1886)
- Megalorhipida leucodactylus (Fabricius, 1794)
- Megalorhipida parvula Arenberger, 2010
- Merrifieldia malacodactylus (Zeller, 1847)
- Platyptilia albifimbriata Arenberger, 2002
- Platyptilia dschambiya Arenberger, 1999
- Porrittia imbecilla (Meyrick, 1925)
- Procapperia hackeri Arenberger, 2002
- Pterophorus ischnodactyla (Treitschke, 1833)
- Pterophorus rhyparias (Meyrick, 1908)
- Puerphorus olbiadactylus (Millière, 1859)
- Stangeia siceliota (Zeller, 1847)
- Stenodacma wahlbergi (Zeller, 1852)
- Stenoptilia amseli Arenberger, 1990
- Stenoptilia aridus (Zeller, 1847)
- Stenoptilia balsami Arenberger, 2010
- Stenoptilia elkefi Arenberger, 1984
- Stenoptilia sanaa Arenberger, 1999

== Pyralidae ==
- Achroia grisella (Fabricius, 1794)
- Ancylosis faustinella (Zeller, 1867)
- Ancylosis limoniella (Chrétien, 1911)
- Ancylosis nigripunctella (Staudigner, 1879)
- Cadra cautella (Walker, 1863)
- Candiope erubescens (Hampson, 1896)
- Candiope joannisella Ragonot, 1888
- Endotricha erythralis Mabille, 1900
- Ephestia elutella (Hübner, 1796)
- Etiella zinckenella (Treitschke, 1832)
- Nephopterix divisella (Duponchel, 1842)
- Nephopterix metamelana Hampson, 1896
- Nephopterix nigristriata Hampson, 1896
- Phycita phoenicocraspis Hampson, 1896
- Phycita poteriella Zeller, 1846
- Polyocha depressella (Swinhoe, 1885)
- Pyralis galactalis Hampson, 1916
- Pyralis obsoletalis Mann, 1864
- Raphimetopus ablutella (Zeller, 1839)
- Staudingeria proniphea (Hampson, 1896)
- Staudingeria suboblitella (Ragonot, 1888)
- Staudingeria yerburii (Butler, 1884)

== Saturniidae ==
- Yatanga arabica (Rougeot, 1977)
- Yatanga smithi (Holland, 1892)

== Sesiidae ==
- Crinipus leucozonipus Hampson, 1896

== Sphingidae ==
- Acherontia styx (Westwood, 1848)
- Agrius convolvuli (Linnaeus, 1758)
- Basiothia medea (Fabricius, 1781)
- Batocnema cocquerelii (Boisduval, 1875)
- Cephonodes hylas (Linnaeus, 1771)
- Daphnis nerii (Linnaeus, 1758)
- Euchloron megaera (Linnaeus, 1758)
- Hippotion celerio (Linnaeus, 1758)
- Hippotion rosae (Butler, 1882)
- Hippotion socotrensis (Rebel, 1899)
- Hyles livornica (Esper, 1780)
- Nephele vau (Walker, 1856)
- Sphingonaepiopsis nana (Walker, 1856)

== Tineidae ==
- Perissomastix taeniaecornis (Walsingham, 1896)
- Phthoropoea carpella Walsingham, 1896
- Tinea messalina Robinson, 1979
- Trichophaga abruptella (Wollaston, 1858)
- Trichophaga swinhoei (Butler, 1884)

== Tortricidae ==
- Cryptophlebia socotrensis Walsingham, 1900
- Dasodis cladographa Diakonoff, 1983

== Xyloryctidae ==
- Enolmis jemenensis Bengtsson, 2002
- Eretmocera bradleyi Amsel, 1961
- Eretmocera jemensis Rebel, 1930
- Scythris abyanensis Bengtsson, 2002
- Scythris albiangulella Bengtsson, 2002
- Scythris albocanella Bengtsson, 2002
- Scythris albogrammella Bengtsson, 2002
- Scythris amplexella Bengtsson, 2002
- Scythris badiella Bengtsson, 2002
- Scythris basilicella Bengtsson, 2002
- Scythris beccella Bengtsson, 2002
- Scythris biacutella Bengtsson, 2002
- Scythris bicuspidella Bengtsson, 2002
- Scythris bispinella Bengtsson, 2002
- Scythris camelella Walsingham, 1907
- Scythris canella Bengtsson, 2002
- Scythris capnofasciae Bengtsson, 2002
- Scythris ceratella Bengtsson, 2002
- Scythris cinisella Bengtsson, 2002
- Scythris consimilella Bengtsson, 2002
- Scythris cucullella Bengtsson, 2002
- Scythris cuneatella Bengtsson, 2002
- Scythris curvipilella Bengtsson, 2002
- Scythris fibigeri Bengtsson, 2002
- Scythris fissurella Bengtsson, 1997
- Scythris galeatella Bengtsson, 2002
- Scythris indigoferivora Bengtsson, 2002
- Scythris iterella Bengtsson, 2002
- Scythris jemenensis Bengtsson, 2002
- Scythris meraula Meyrick, 1916
- Scythris nigrogrammella Bengtsson, 2002
- Scythris nigropterella Bengtsson, 2002
- Scythris nipholecta Meyrick, 1924
- Scythris nivicolor Meyrick, 1916
- Scythris ochrea Walsingham, 1896
- Scythris pangalactis Meyrick, 1933
- Scythris paralogella Bengtsson, 2002
- Scythris parenthesella Bengtsson, 2002
- Scythris pollicella Bengtsson, 2002
- Scythris pterosaurella Bengtsson, 2002
- Scythris reflectella Bengtsson, 2002
- Scythris sanae Bengtsson, 2002
- Scythris scyphella Bengtsson, 2002
- Scythris sinuosella Bengtsson, 2002
- Scythris sordidella Bengtsson, 2002
- Scythris strabella Bengtsson, 2002
- Scythris subgaleatella Bengtsson, 2002
- Scythris subparachalca Bengtsson, 2002
- Scythris taizzae Bengtsson, 2002
- Scythris tenebrella Bengtsson, 2002
- Scythris valgella Bengtsson, 2002
- Scythris valvaearcella Bengtsson, 2002
