= Alloclita haifensis =

Scientific classification
- Domain: Eukaryota
- Kingdom: Animalia
- Phylum: Arthropoda
- Class: Insecta
- Order: Lepidoptera
- Family: Cosmopterigidae
- Genus: Alloclita
- Species: A. haifensis

Binomial name
- Alloclita haifensis Rebel, 1911

Synonyms
- Mompha litorella Amsel, 1935

Species of moth

Alloclita haifensis is a moth in the family Cosmopterigidae. It is found in the Near East and the Middle East (including Israel and the Palestinian territories).

== Description ==
The species head, thorax, forewings, and antennae are yellowish-white coloured. They have dark brown scales, which are intermixed with pale greyish cilia. The first quarter of a basal is dark brown coloured but is paler near a base. The outer edges are prolonged near the apex, with a media fascia being of dark grey colour. The third quarter is dark greyish-brown in colour with prolonged costa and dorsum which are connected with middle fascia. The male genitalia resembles the one of Alloclita recisella, but is different. The main difference is that this particular species have a much longer left brachium and much strongly bent valvellae. It is also have a bent on a right angle of the aedeagus.

The wingspan is 13–15 millimetres (0.51–0.59 in). Adults have been recorded in May in sand dune areas.
