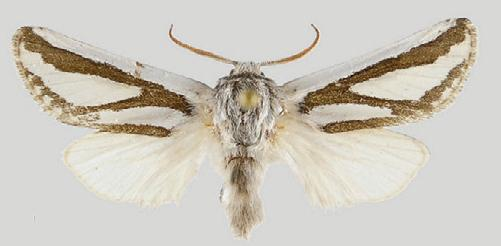
- Mormogystia brandstetteri (male)

Scientific classification
- Kingdom: Animalia
- Phylum: Arthropoda
- Clade: Pancrustacea
- Class: Insecta
- Order: Lepidoptera
- Family: Cossidae
- Subfamily: Cossinae
- Genus: Mormogystia; Schoorl, 1990

Species
- See text

= Mormogystia =

Genus of moths

Mormogystia is a genus of moths belonging to the family Cossidae. Mormogystia species are medium-sized moths with bright colours and uniformly-coloured hindwings. They have large silvery areas on the forewing, a trait that distinguishes them from all other Cossidae genera. Males have bipectinate antennae with short processes, while females have highly reduced antennal pecten. They are found in North Africa, the Levant, Arabian Peninsula, and Kenya.

== Diagnosis ==
Mormogystia species are medium-sized moths with bright colours and uniformly-coloured hindwings. They have large silvery areas on the forewing, a trait that distinguishes them from all other Cossidae genera. Males have bipectinate antennae with short processes, while females have highly reduced antennal pecten.

In the male genitalia, the uncus is elongated, ending in a broad tip that may be either tapered or rounded. The arms of the gnathos are short and fused into a medium-sized structure densely covered with tiny spines. The valvae are shaped like shovels, featuring a prominent sacculus and a large triangular projection on the costal side. The transtilla has short, thick, hook-like (uncinate) projections. The juxta is saddle-shaped with long side extensions that curve upward. The saccus is large and semicircular. The aedeagus is short, straight, and thick, with the vesica opening located at the upper rear (dorsal-apical) end. The edges of the opening have short, spiny projections, and the vesica lacks a cornutus.

In the female genitalia, the oviduct is short. The papillae anales are broad and elliptical in shape. The posterior apophyses are about one-third longer than the anterior ones. The ostium is wide and covered by a sickle-shaped (falciform) postvaginal plate. The ductus is wide and hardened (sclerotized). The bursa is soft, sack-like, and lacks any signa.

== Distribution ==
The genus is distributed in North Africa, the Levant, Arabian Peninsula, and Kenya.

== Species ==
- Mormogystia brandstetteri Saldaitis, Ivinskis & Yakovlev, 2011
- Mormogystia equatorialis (Le Cerf, 1933)
- Mormogystia proleuca (Hampson in Walsingham et Hampson, 1896)
- Mormogystia reibellii (Oberthür, 1876)
