= Alloclita francoeuriae =

Scientific classification
- Domain: Eukaryota
- Kingdom: Animalia
- Phylum: Arthropoda
- Class: Insecta
- Order: Lepidoptera
- Family: Cosmopterigidae
- Genus: Alloclita
- Species: A. francoeuriae

Binomial name
- Alloclita francoeuriae Walsingham, 1905

Synonyms
- Aristotelia francoeuriae

Species of moth

Alloclita delozona is a moth in the family Cosmopterigidae. It is found in North Africa (Algeria, Tunisia and Morocco).

The wingspan is about 15 mm (0.59 in). Adults have been recorded from the end of February to the beginning of April.

The larvae feed on Pulicaria.
