= Turatia serratina =

Scientific classification
- Kingdom: Animalia
- Phylum: Arthropoda
- Clade: Pancrustacea
- Class: Insecta
- Order: Lepidoptera
- Family: Autostichidae
- Genus: Turatia
- Species: T. serratina

Binomial name
- Turatia serratina (Gozmány, 1967)

Synonyms
- Ilionarsis serratina Gozmány, 1967

Species of moth

Turatia serratina is a moth in the family Autostichidae. It was described by László Anthony Gozmány in 1967. It is found in Algeria.
