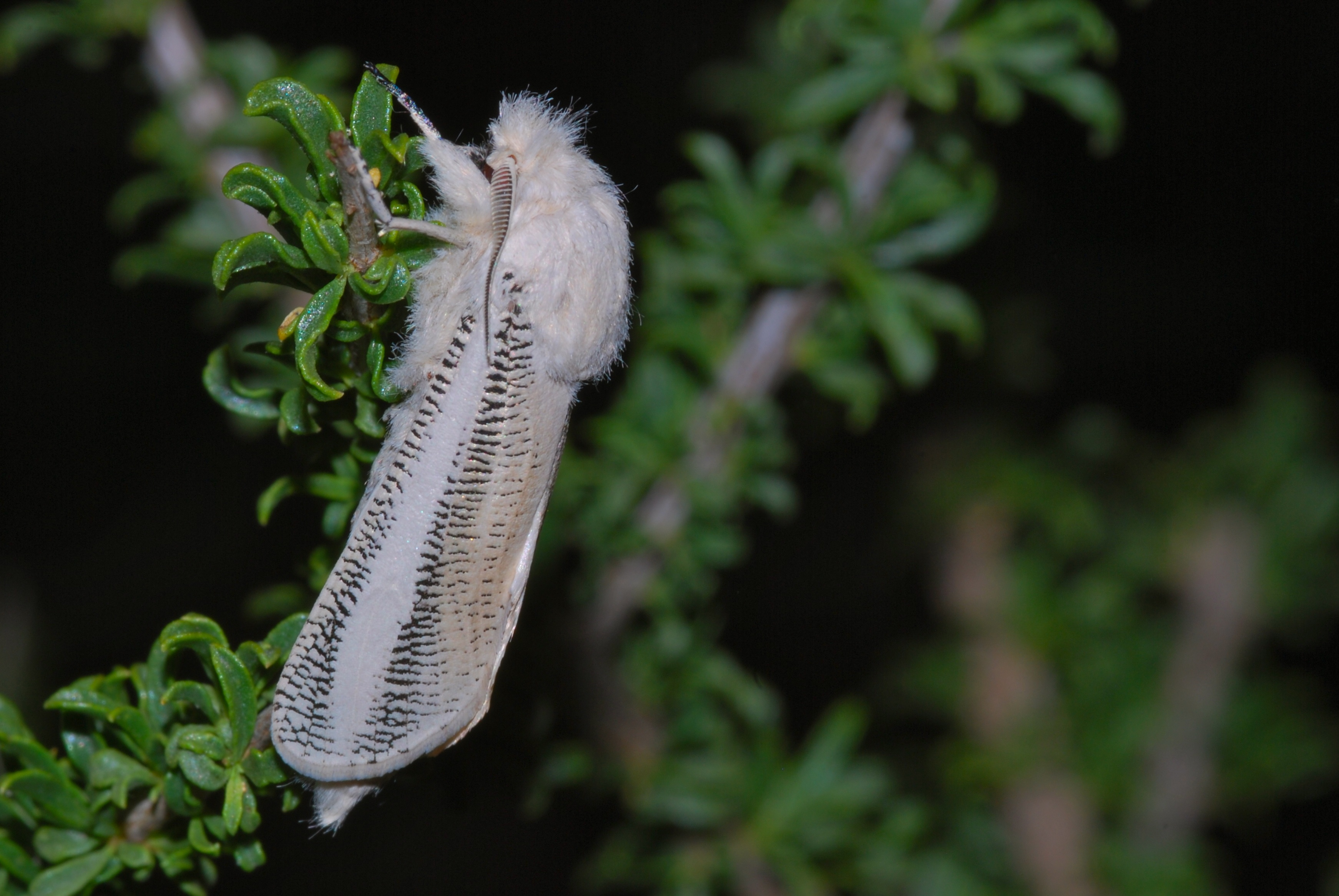

Scientific classification
- Kingdom: Animalia
- Phylum: Arthropoda
- Class: Insecta
- Order: Lepidoptera
- Family: Cossidae
- Genus: Azygophleps
- Species: A. asylas

Binomial name
- Azygophleps asylas (Cramer, 1779)

Synonyms
- Phalaena asylas Cramer, 1779; Zeuzera strigulosa Walker, 1856; Zeuzera canadensis Herrich-Schäffer, [1854]

= Azygophleps asylas =

Species of moth

Azygophleps asylas is a moth in the family Cossidae. It is found from central to southern Africa, including Namibia and South Africa.
