= Azygophleps atrifasciata =

Scientific classification
- Kingdom: Animalia
- Phylum: Arthropoda
- Class: Insecta
- Order: Lepidoptera
- Family: Cossidae
- Genus: Azygophleps
- Species: A. atrifasciata

Binomial name
- Azygophleps atrifasciata Hampson, 1910

Species of moth

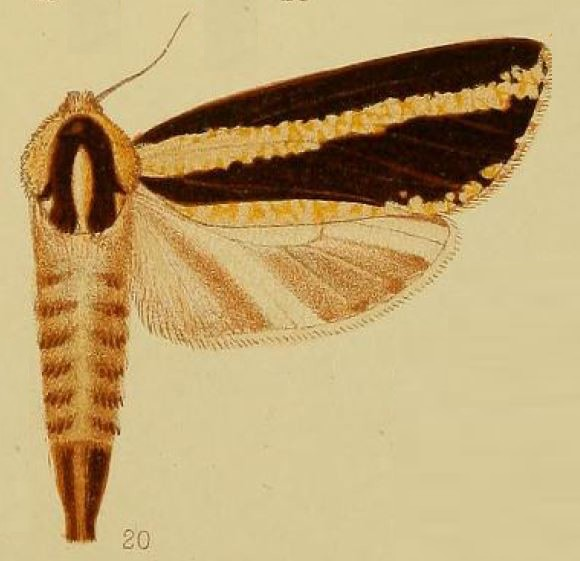
Azygophleps atrifasciata

Azygophleps atrifasciata is a moth in the family Cossidae. It is found in Zimbabwe, Zambia, Uganda, Kenya, Angola, Malawi and South Africa.
