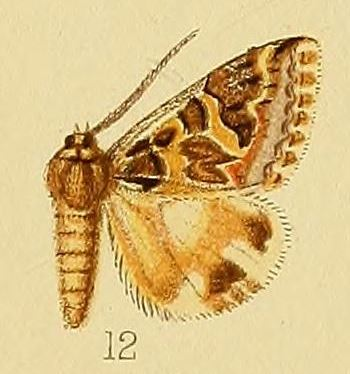

Scientific classification
- Kingdom: Animalia
- Phylum: Arthropoda
- Class: Insecta
- Order: Lepidoptera
- Superfamily: Noctuoidea
- Family: Erebidae
- Genus: Cerocala
- Species: C. sana

Binomial name
- Cerocala sana Staudinger, 1901

Synonyms
- Cerocala perorsorum; Cerocala rothscihldi; Cerocala fulgens; Cerocala turatii; Cerocala perorsorum autumnalis; Cerocala perorsorum ab. fulgens; Cerocala scapulosa var. sana; Cerocala scapulosa albifusa; Cerocala rothschildi (Turati, 1924)

= Cerocala sana =

Species of moth

Cerocala sana is a moth of the family Erebidae first described by Otto Staudinger in 1901. It is found in North Africa, Iran, Iraq, Bahrain and Israel.

There are two generations per year. Adults are on wing from October to April.

The larvae feed on Helianthemum kahiricum and Helianthemum lipii.
