= Alloclita xylodesma =

Scientific classification
- Kingdom: Animalia
- Phylum: Arthropoda
- Class: Insecta
- Order: Lepidoptera
- Family: Cosmopterigidae
- Genus: Alloclita
- Species: A. xylodesma

Binomial name
- Alloclita xylodesma Meyrick, 1911

Species of moth

Alloclita xylodesma is a moth in the family Cosmopterigidae. It was described by Edward Meyrick in 1911. It is found in South Africa.

The wingspan is about 17 mm (0.67 in). The forewings are dark fuscous, faintly purplish tinged. There is a moderately broad ochreous-white transverse fascia before one-third, partially edged with black and then with brown suffusion, the posterior edge angulated below the middle, the black marginal dots above and below this indicating the stigmata. A triangular ochreous-white spot is found on the costa at two-thirds, and an ochreous-white dot on the tornus, connected by a narrow brown fascia in which is a small black spot representing the second discal stigma. There is also an ochreous-white apical dot. The hindwings are dark grey.
