= Alloclita plumbaria =

Scientific classification
- Kingdom: Animalia
- Phylum: Arthropoda
- Class: Insecta
- Order: Lepidoptera
- Family: Cosmopterigidae
- Genus: Alloclita
- Species: A. plumbaria

Binomial name
- Alloclita plumbaria (Meyrick, 1921)

Synonyms
- Proceleustis plumbaria Meyrick, 1921

Species of moth

Alloclita plumbaria is a moth in the family Cosmopterigidae. It was described by Edward Meyrick in 1921. It is found in Zimbabwe.
