= Alloclita zelotypa =

Scientific classification
- Kingdom: Animalia
- Phylum: Arthropoda
- Class: Insecta
- Order: Lepidoptera
- Family: Cosmopterigidae
- Genus: Alloclita
- Species: A. zelotypa

Binomial name
- Alloclita zelotypa Meyrick, 1918

Species of moth

Alloclita zelotypa is a moth in the family Cosmopterigidae. It was described by Edward Meyrick in 1918. It is found in Mozambique.
