= Turatia =

Scientific classification
- Domain: Eukaryota
- Kingdom: Animalia
- Phylum: Arthropoda
- Class: Insecta
- Order: Lepidoptera
- Family: Autostichidae
- Subfamily: Holcopogoninae
- Genus: Turatia; Amsel, 1942

Synonyms
- Ilionarsis Gozmány, 1959

Genus of moths

Turatia is a moth genus in the family Autostichidae.

== Species ==
- Turatia arenacea Gozmány, 2000
- Turatia argillacea Gozmány, 2000
- Turatia chretieni Gorzmány, 2000
- Turatia foeldvarii (Gozmány, 1959)
- Turatia iranica Gozmány, 2000
- Turatia morettii (Turati, 1926)
- Turatia namibiella Derra, 2011
- Turatia psameticella (Rebel, 1914)
- Turatia psammella (Amsel, 1933)
- Turatia scioneura (Meyrick, 1929)
- Turatia scutigera Gozmány, 2000
- Turatia serratina (Gozmány, 1967)
- Turatia striatula Gozmány, 2000
- Turatia tenebrata Gozmány, 2000
- Turatia turpicula Gozmány, 2000
- Turatia yemenensis Derra, 2008
