= Azygophleps albofasciata =

Scientific classification
- Domain: Eukaryota
- Kingdom: Animalia
- Phylum: Arthropoda
- Class: Insecta
- Order: Lepidoptera
- Family: Cossidae
- Genus: Azygophleps
- Species: A. albofasciata

Binomial name
- Azygophleps albofasciata (Moore, 1879)

Synonyms
- Zenzera albofasciata Moore, 1879; Zeuzera albofasciata

Species of moth

Azygophleps albofasciata is a moth in the family Cossidae. It is found in India and Pakistan.
