= Azygophleps sponda =

Scientific classification
- Kingdom: Animalia
- Phylum: Arthropoda
- Clade: Pancrustacea
- Class: Insecta
- Order: Lepidoptera
- Family: Cossidae
- Genus: Azygophleps
- Species: A. sponda

Binomial name
- Azygophleps sponda (Wallengren, 1875)

Synonyms
- Zeuzera sponda Walengren, 1875

Species of moth

Azygophleps sponda is a moth in the family Cossidae, found in South Africa.
