= Azygophleps simplex =

Scientific classification
- Domain: Eukaryota
- Kingdom: Animalia
- Phylum: Arthropoda
- Class: Insecta
- Order: Lepidoptera
- Family: Cossidae
- Genus: Azygophleps
- Species: A. simplex

Binomial name
- Azygophleps simplex Aurivillius, 1905

Species of moth

Azygophleps simplex is a moth in the family Cossidae found in Nigeria.
