= Phthorimaea sphenophora =

Scientific classification
- Domain: Eukaryota
- Kingdom: Animalia
- Phylum: Arthropoda
- Class: Insecta
- Order: Lepidoptera
- Family: Gelechiidae
- Genus: Phthorimaea
- Species: P. sphenophora

Binomial name
- Phthorimaea sphenophora (Walsingham, 1897)

Synonyms
- Gelechia sphenophora Walsingham, 1897

Species of moth

Phthorimaea sphenophora is a moth in the family Gelechiidae. It was described by Thomas de Grey, 6th Baron Walsingham, in 1897. It is found in the West Indies, where it has been recorded from Grenada.

The wingspan is about 10 mm (0.39 in). The forewings are olive-brown, inclining to ferruginous at the base, the lighter basal patch is bounded externally by an oblique cuneiform ochreous streak, tending outwards from the costa at one-fifth from the base and reaching to the fold. A small ochreous spot lies at the end of the discal cell, and a larger, rather paler, costal spot at the commencement of the costal cilia. Around the termen are four or five ill-defined pale ochreous spots before the commencement of the olive-brown cilia. The hindwings are blue-grey.
