= Stiphrometasia sancta =

Scientific classification
- Kingdom: Animalia
- Phylum: Arthropoda
- Clade: Pancrustacea
- Class: Insecta
- Order: Lepidoptera
- Family: Crambidae
- Genus: Stiphrometasia
- Species: S. sancta

Binomial name
- Stiphrometasia sancta (Hampson, 1900)

Synonyms
- Metasia sancta Hampson, 1900

Species of moth

Stiphrometasia sancta is a moth in the family Crambidae. It is found in Syria, Iran, Turkey and Israel.
