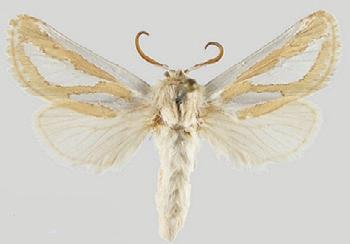
- Male

Scientific classification
- Domain: Eukaryota
- Kingdom: Animalia
- Phylum: Arthropoda
- Class: Insecta
- Order: Lepidoptera
- Family: Cossidae
- Genus: Mormogystia
- Species: M. reibellii

Binomial name
- Mormogystia reibellii (Oberthür, 1876)

Synonyms
- Hypopta reibellii Oberthür, 1876; Hypopta reibelli; Hypopta mussolinii Turati, 1927; Hypopta cognata Krüger, 1939

= Mormogystia reibellii =

Species of moth

Mormogystia reibellii is a moth in the family Cossidae. It is found in North Africa and the northern part of the Arabian Peninsula, including the northern part of Saudi Arabia, northern Oman, the United Arab Emirates, Israel, Egypt, Algeria, Libya, Tunisia, Mauritania, Niger and Chad.

The wingspan is 27–31 mm.r
