= Phthorimaea ferella =

Scientific classification
- Kingdom: Animalia
- Phylum: Arthropoda
- Class: Insecta
- Order: Lepidoptera
- Family: Gelechiidae
- Genus: Phthorimaea
- Species: P. ferella

Binomial name
- Phthorimaea ferella (Berg, 1875)

Synonyms
- Gelechia ferella Berg, 1875

Species of moth

Phthorimaea ferella is a moth in the family Gelechiidae. It was described by Carlos Berg in 1875 and is found in Patagonia.

The wingspan is 10–12 mm. The forewings are dirty yellowish brown with dark irroration (speckling), which is somewhat lighter on the inner margin. The hindwings are yellowish.
