= Alloclita subitariella =

Scientific classification
- Domain: Eukaryota
- Kingdom: Animalia
- Phylum: Arthropoda
- Class: Insecta
- Order: Lepidoptera
- Family: Cosmopterigidae
- Genus: Alloclita
- Species: A. subitariella

Binomial name
- Alloclita subitariella Riedl, 1993

Species of moth

Alloclita subitariella is a moth in the family Cosmopterigidae. It was described by Riedl in 1993. It is found in Saudi Arabia.
