= Azygophleps cooksoni =

Scientific classification
- Domain: Eukaryota
- Kingdom: Animalia
- Phylum: Arthropoda
- Class: Insecta
- Order: Lepidoptera
- Family: Cossidae
- Genus: Azygophleps
- Species: A. cooksoni

Binomial name
- Azygophleps cooksoni Pinhey, 1968

Species of moth

Azygophleps cooksoni is a moth in the family Cossidae. It is found in Natal Province, South Africa.
