= Azygophleps albovittata =

Scientific classification
- Kingdom: Animalia
- Phylum: Arthropoda
- Clade: Pancrustacea
- Class: Insecta
- Order: Lepidoptera
- Family: Cossidae
- Genus: Azygophleps
- Species: A. albovittata

Binomial name
- Azygophleps albovittata Bethune-Baker, 1908

Species of moth

Azygophleps albovittata is a moth in the family Cossidae. It is found in Nigeria, Ghana, Uganda, the Democratic Republic of the Congo, Kenya, Guinea and Zimbabwe.
