= Turatia psameticella =

Scientific classification
- Domain: Eukaryota
- Kingdom: Animalia
- Phylum: Arthropoda
- Class: Insecta
- Order: Lepidoptera
- Family: Autostichidae
- Genus: Turatia
- Species: T. psameticella

Binomial name
- Turatia psameticella (Rebel, 1914)

Synonyms
- Holcopogon psameticella Rebel, 1914

Species of moth

Turatia psameticella is a moth in the family Autostichidae. It was described by Hans Rebel in 1914. It is found in Libya, Egypt, Israel and Bahrain.
