= Meharia tanganyikae =

Scientific classification
- Kingdom: Animalia
- Phylum: Arthropoda
- Class: Insecta
- Order: Lepidoptera
- Family: Cossidae
- Genus: Meharia
- Species: M. tanganyikae

Binomial name
- Meharia tanganyikae Bradley, 1952

Species of moth

Meharia tanganyikae is a moth in the family Cossidae. It is found in eastern Africa.
