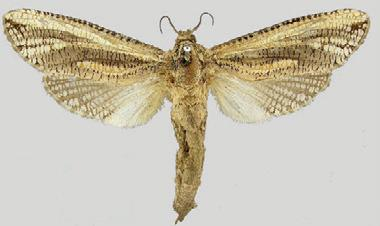
- Female

Scientific classification
- Kingdom: Animalia
- Phylum: Arthropoda
- Class: Insecta
- Order: Lepidoptera
- Family: Cossidae
- Genus: Azygophleps
- Species: A. inclusa

Binomial name
- Azygophleps inclusa (Walker, 1856)

Synonyms
- Zeuzera inclusa Walker, 1856; Zeuzera petax Wallengren, 1860

= Azygophleps inclusa =

Species of moth

Azygophleps inclusa is a moth in the family Cossidae. It is found in Kenya, Tanzania, Zambia, Angola, Malawi, Mozambique, Botswana, South Africa, Lesotho, Uganda, the Democratic Republic of the Congo, Ghana, Sierra Leone, Guinea and Côte d'Ivoire.
