= Alloclita reflua =

Scientific classification
- Kingdom: Animalia
- Phylum: Arthropoda
- Class: Insecta
- Order: Lepidoptera
- Family: Cosmopterigidae
- Genus: Alloclita
- Species: A. reflua

Binomial name
- Alloclita reflua Meyrick, 1914

Species of moth

Alloclita reflua is a moth in the family Cosmopterigidae. It was described by Edward Meyrick in 1914. It is found in India and Sri Lanka.
