= Azygophleps pallens =

Scientific classification
- Domain: Eukaryota
- Kingdom: Animalia
- Phylum: Arthropoda
- Class: Insecta
- Order: Lepidoptera
- Family: Cossidae
- Genus: Azygophleps
- Species: A. pallens

Binomial name
- Azygophleps pallens (Herrich-Schäffer, [1854])

Synonyms
- Phragmataecia pallens Herrich-Schäffer, [1854]

Species of moth

Azygophleps pallens is a moth in the family Cossidae. It is found in Sierra Leone, Uganda, Nigeria, Cameroon, Kenya and Sudan.
