= Azygophleps melanophele =

Scientific classification
- Kingdom: Animalia
- Phylum: Arthropoda
- Class: Insecta
- Order: Lepidoptera
- Family: Cossidae
- Genus: Azygophleps
- Species: A. melanophele

Binomial name
- Azygophleps melanophele Hampson, 1910

Species of moth

Azygophleps melanophele is a moth in the family Cossidae. It is found in central Africa, including Nigeria.
