= Phthorimaea pherometopa =

Scientific classification
- Kingdom: Animalia
- Phylum: Arthropoda
- Clade: Pancrustacea
- Class: Insecta
- Order: Lepidoptera
- Family: Gelechiidae
- Genus: Phthorimaea
- Species: P. pherometopa

Binomial name
- Phthorimaea pherometopa Povolný, 1967

Species of moth

Phthorimaea pherometopa is a moth in the family Gelechiidae. It was described by Povolný in 1967. It is found in Mexico.
