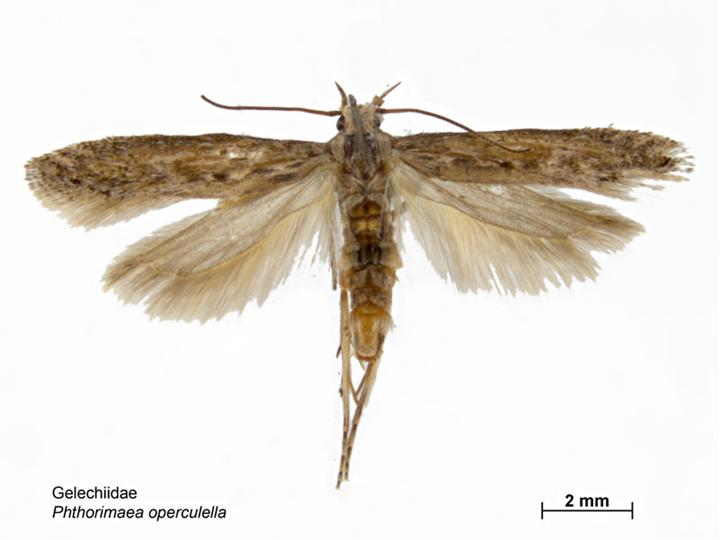
- Phthorimaea operculella

Scientific classification
- Domain: Eukaryota
- Kingdom: Animalia
- Phylum: Arthropoda
- Class: Insecta
- Order: Lepidoptera
- Family: Gelechiidae
- Subfamily: Gelechiinae
- Tribe: Gnorimoschemini
- Genus: Phthorimaea; Meyrick, 1902

= Phthorimaea =

Genus of moths

Phthorimaea is a genus of moths in the family Gelechiidae. Species include the potato tuber moth, Phthorimaea operculella.

== Species ==
- Phthorimaea euchthonia Meyrick, 1939
- Phthorimaea exacta Meyrick, 1917
- Phthorimaea ferella (Berg, 1875)
- Phthorimaea impudica Walsingham, 1911
- Phthorimaea interjuncta Meyrick, 1931
- Phthorimaea involuta Meyrick, 1917
- Phthorimaea molitor (Walsingham, 1896)
- Phthorimaea operculella (Zeller, 1873)
- Phthorimaea perfidiosa Meyrick, 1917
- Phthorimaea pherometopa Povolný, 1967
- Phthorimaea robusta Povolný, 1989
- Phthorimaea sphenophora (Walsingham, 1897)
- Phthorimaea suavella (Caradja, 1920)
- Phthorimaea urosema Meyrick, 1917

== Status unknown ==
- Phthorimaea albicostella (Vorbrodt, 1928), described as Lita albicostella from Switzerland.
- Phthorimaea tobisella Palm, 1947 [nomen nudum]
