= Stiphrometasia pharaonalis =

Scientific classification
- Kingdom: Animalia
- Phylum: Arthropoda
- Clade: Pancrustacea
- Class: Insecta
- Order: Lepidoptera
- Family: Crambidae
- Genus: Stiphrometasia
- Species: S. pharaonalis

Binomial name
- Stiphrometasia pharaonalis Caradja, 1916

Moth in the family Crambidae

Stiphrometasia pharaonalis is a moth in the family Crambidae. It is found in Egypt.
