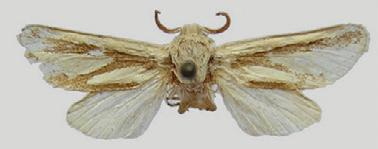
- Male

Scientific classification
- Domain: Eukaryota
- Kingdom: Animalia
- Phylum: Arthropoda
- Class: Insecta
- Order: Lepidoptera
- Family: Cossidae
- Genus: Mormogystia
- Species: M. equatorialis

Binomial name
- Mormogystia equatorialis (Le Cerf, 1933)

Synonyms
- Hypopta reibeli equatorialis Le Cerf, 1933

= Mormogystia equatorialis =

Species of moth

Mormogystia equatorialis is a moth in the family Cossidae. It is found in Kenya.

The wingspan is about 26 mm. The ground colour of the forewings is brown. The head, thorax and abdomen are white.
