= Alloclita paraphracta =

Scientific classification
- Kingdom: Animalia
- Phylum: Arthropoda
- Class: Insecta
- Order: Lepidoptera
- Family: Cosmopterigidae
- Genus: Alloclita
- Species: A. paraphracta

Binomial name
- Alloclita paraphracta (Meyrick, 1914)

Synonyms
- Proceleustis paraphracta Meyrick, 1914

Species of moth

Alloclita paraphracta is a moth in the family Cosmopterigidae. It was described by Edward Meyrick in 1914. It is found in South Africa.
