= Azygophleps ganzelkozikmundi =

Scientific classification
- Kingdom: Animalia
- Phylum: Arthropoda
- Clade: Pancrustacea
- Class: Insecta
- Order: Lepidoptera
- Family: Cossidae
- Genus: Azygophleps
- Species: A. ganzelkozikmundi

Binomial name
- Azygophleps ganzelkozikmundi Yakovlev, 2009

Species of moth

Azygophleps ganzelkozikmundi is a moth in the family Cossidae. It is found in Cameroon and the Democratic Republic of the Congo.
