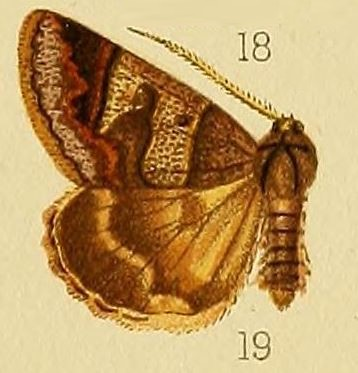
- Cerocala contraria

Scientific classification
- Kingdom: Animalia
- Phylum: Arthropoda
- Class: Insecta
- Order: Lepidoptera
- Superfamily: Noctuoidea
- Family: Erebidae
- Genus: Cerocala
- Species: C. contraria

Binomial name
- Cerocala contraria (Walker, 1865)

Synonyms
- Poaphila contraria Walker, 1865; Bolina revulsa Wallengren, 1875

= Cerocala contraria =

Species of moth

Cerocala contraria is a moth of the family Erebidae.

== Distribution ==
It is found in South & East Africa, where it is known from Kenya, South Africa and Zimbabwe.
