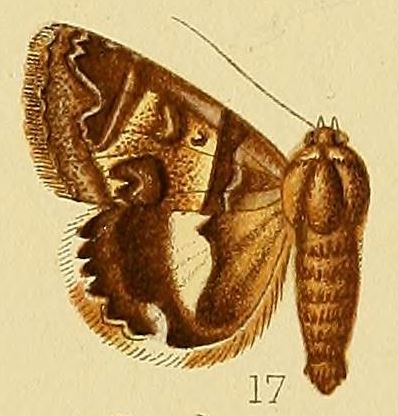
- Cerocala orientalis

Scientific classification
- Kingdom: Animalia
- Phylum: Arthropoda
- Class: Insecta
- Order: Lepidoptera
- Superfamily: Noctuoidea
- Family: Erebidae
- Genus: Cerocala
- Species: C. orientalis

Binomial name
- Cerocala orientalis de Joannis 1912

= Cerocala orientalis =

Species of moth

Cerocala orientalis is a moth of the family Erebidae.

== Distribution ==
It is found in Cochinchina (southern Vietnam).
