= Turatia foeldvarii =

Scientific classification
- Kingdom: Animalia
- Phylum: Arthropoda
- Clade: Pancrustacea
- Class: Insecta
- Order: Lepidoptera
- Family: Autostichidae
- Genus: Turatia
- Species: T. foeldvarii

Binomial name
- Turatia foeldvarii (Gozmány, 1959)

Synonyms
- Ilionarsis földvarii Gozmány, 1959; Ilionarsis foeldvarii

Species of moth

Turatia foeldvarii is a moth in the family Autostichidae. It was described by László Anthony Gozmány in 1959. It is found in Egypt.
