= Azygophleps confucianus =

Scientific classification
- Kingdom: Animalia
- Phylum: Arthropoda
- Clade: Pancrustacea
- Class: Insecta
- Order: Lepidoptera
- Family: Cossidae
- Genus: Azygophleps
- Species: A. confucianus

Binomial name
- Azygophleps confucianus Yakovlev, 2006

Species of moth

Azygophleps confucianus is a moth in the family Cossidae. It is found in China (south-eastern Tibet, north-western Sichuan, Yunnan, Guizhou, Qinghai).
