= Azygophleps aburae =

Scientific classification
- Domain: Eukaryota
- Kingdom: Animalia
- Phylum: Arthropoda
- Class: Insecta
- Order: Lepidoptera
- Family: Cossidae
- Genus: Azygophleps
- Species: A. aburae

Binomial name
- Azygophleps aburae (Plötz, 1880)

Synonyms
- Zeuzera aburae Plötz, 1880

Species of moth

Azygophleps aburae is a moth in the family Cossidae. It is found in Zimbabwe, Kenya, Ghana, Cameroon and Sudan.
