= Meharia murphyi =

Scientific classification
- Kingdom: Animalia
- Phylum: Arthropoda
- Clade: Pancrustacea
- Class: Insecta
- Order: Lepidoptera
- Family: Cossidae
- Genus: Meharia
- Species: M. murphyi

Binomial name
- Meharia murphyi Yakovlev & Saldaitis, 2013

Species of moth

Meharia murphyi is a moth in the family Cossidae. It is found in Malawi.
