= Amselia heringi =

Scientific classification
- Kingdom: Animalia
- Phylum: Arthropoda
- Clade: Pancrustacea
- Class: Insecta
- Order: Lepidoptera
- Family: Crambidae
- Subfamily: Crambinae
- Tribe: Crambini
- Genus: Amselia
- Species: A. heringi

Binomial name
- Amselia heringi (Amsel, 1935)

Synonyms
- Crambus heringi Amsel, 1935

Species of moth

Amselia heringi is a species of moth in the family Crambidae. The species was first described by Hans Georg Amsel in 1935, (Note: as Crambus heringi, in Amsel, H.G. (1935). "Neue palästinensische Lepidopteren". Mitteilungen aus dem Zoologischen Museum in Berlin. 20 (2).) and is the type species of genus Amselia.

It is found in multiple countries in the Middle East, as well as Morocco. Its type locality is in Israel.

The forewing colour is variable.
