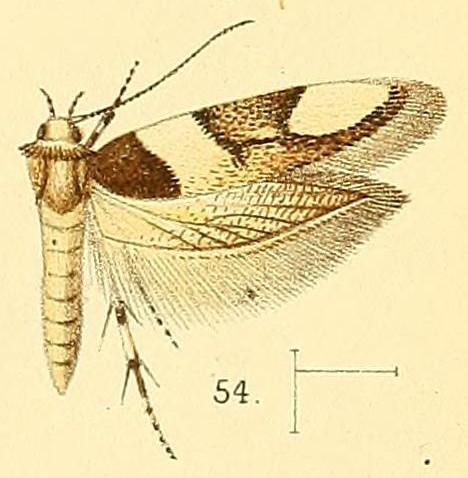
- Alloclita gambiella

Scientific classification
- Domain: Eukaryota
- Kingdom: Animalia
- Phylum: Arthropoda
- Class: Insecta
- Order: Lepidoptera
- Family: Cosmopterigidae
- Subfamily: Antequerinae
- Genus: Alloclita; Staudinger, 1859

Synonyms
- Dhahrania Amsel, 1958; Proceleustis Meyrick, 1914

= Alloclita =

Genus of moths

Alloclita is a genus of moths in the family Cosmopterigidae.

== Species ==
- Alloclita brachygrapta Meyrick 1925
- Alloclita cerritella (Riedl, 1993)
- Alloclita coleophorella (Riedl, 1993)
- Alloclita delozona Meyrick, 1919
- Alloclita deprinsi Koster & Sinev, 2003
- Alloclita francoeuriae Walsingham, 1905
- Alloclita gambiella (Walsingham, 1891)
- Alloclita insignitella (Riedl, 1993)
- Alloclita haifensis Rebel, 1911
- Alloclita mongolica Sinev, 1992
- Alloclita paraphracta Meyrick, 1914
- Alloclita plumbaria (Meyrick, 1921)
- Alloclita recisella Staudinger, 1859
- Alloclita reflua Meyrick, 1914
- Alloclita subitariella (Riedl, 1993)
- Alloclita xylodesma Meyrick, 1911
- Alloclita zelotypa Meyrick, 1918
