= Meharia scythica =

Scientific classification
- Kingdom: Animalia
- Phylum: Arthropoda
- Clade: Pancrustacea
- Class: Insecta
- Order: Lepidoptera
- Family: Cossidae
- Genus: Meharia
- Species: M. scythica

Binomial name
- Meharia scythica D. Komarov et Zolotuhin, 2005

Species of moth

Meharia scythica is a moth in the family Cossidae. It is found in Russia (Volgograd and Astrakhan regions).
