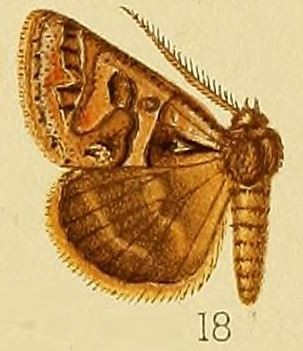

Scientific classification
- Kingdom: Animalia
- Phylum: Arthropoda
- Class: Insecta
- Order: Lepidoptera
- Superfamily: Noctuoidea
- Family: Erebidae
- Genus: Cerocala
- Species: C. masaica

Binomial name
- Cerocala masaica Hampson, 1913

= Cerocala masaica =

Species of moth

Cerocala masaica is a moth of the family Erebidae.

== Distribution ==
It is found in Ethiopia and Kenya.
