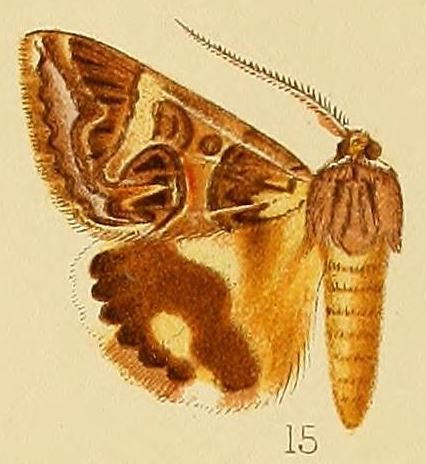

Scientific classification
- Kingdom: Animalia
- Phylum: Arthropoda
- Class: Insecta
- Order: Lepidoptera
- Superfamily: Noctuoidea
- Family: Erebidae
- Genus: Cerocala
- Species: C. vermiculosa

Binomial name
- Cerocala vermiculosa Herrich-Schäffer, 1858

Synonyms
- Cerocala insulicola Karsch, 1907; Cerocala megalesia Griveaud & Viette, 1961

= Cerocala vermiculosa =

Species of moth

Cerocala vermiculosa is a moth of the family Erebidae.

== Distribution ==
It is found in southern Africa, from Zambia to South Africa, including Madagascar.

== Gallery ==
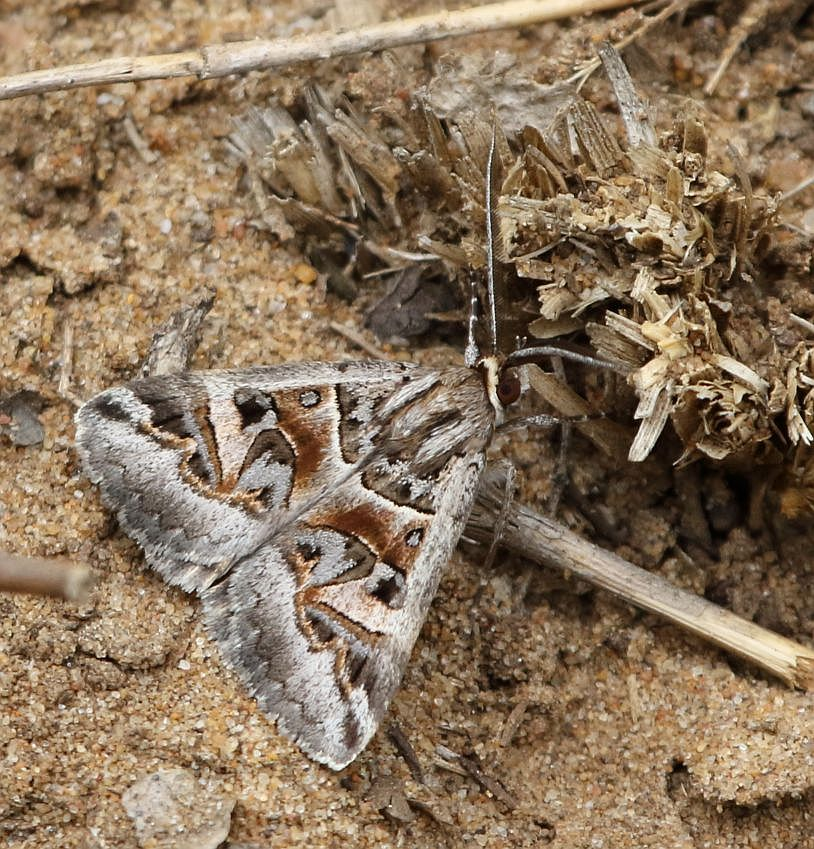
Hluhluwe, KwaZulu-Natal

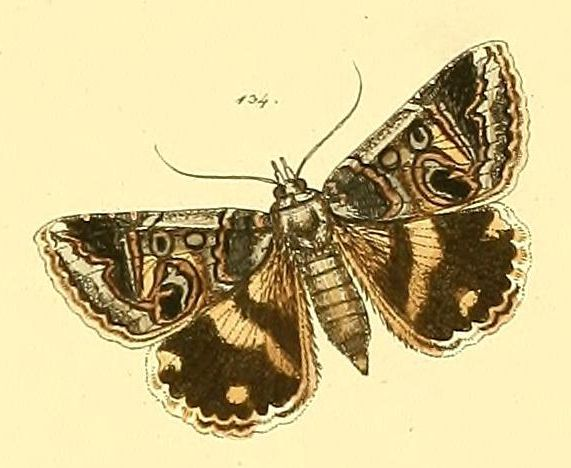
By Herrich-Schäffer, 1858 (type description)
