= Meharia fischeri =

Scientific classification
- Kingdom: Animalia
- Phylum: Arthropoda
- Clade: Pancrustacea
- Class: Insecta
- Order: Lepidoptera
- Family: Cossidae
- Genus: Meharia
- Species: M. fischeri

Binomial name
- Meharia fischeri Yakovlev & Saldaitis, 2008

Species of moth

Meharia fischeri is a moth in the family Cossidae. It is found in Morocco.
