= Turatia arenacea =

Scientific classification
- Kingdom: Animalia
- Phylum: Arthropoda
- Clade: Pancrustacea
- Class: Insecta
- Order: Lepidoptera
- Family: Autostichidae
- Genus: Turatia
- Species: T. arenacea

Binomial name
- Turatia arenacea Gozmány, 2000

Synonyms
- Turatia arenacella

Species of moth

Turatia arenacea is a moth in the family Autostichidae. It was described by László Anthony Gozmány in 2000. It is found in Saudi Arabia.
