= Azygophleps leopardina =

Scientific classification
- Kingdom: Animalia
- Phylum: Arthropoda
- Class: Insecta
- Order: Lepidoptera
- Family: Cossidae
- Genus: Azygophleps
- Species: A. leopardina

Binomial name
- Azygophleps leopardina Distant, 1902

Synonyms
- Azygophleps borchmanni Grünberg, 1910; Azygophleps leopardinae Dalla-Torre, 1923

Species of moth

Azygophleps leopardina is a moth in the family Cossidae. It is found in South Africa, Zambia, Namibia and Kenya.
