= Azygophleps liturata =

Scientific classification
- Kingdom: Animalia
- Phylum: Arthropoda
- Class: Insecta
- Order: Lepidoptera
- Family: Cossidae
- Genus: Azygophleps
- Species: A. liturata

Binomial name
- Azygophleps liturata (Aurivillius, 1879)

Synonyms
- Zeuzera liturata Aurivillius, 1879; Zeuzera aurivillii Kirby, 1892

Species of moth

Azygophleps liturata is a moth in the family Cossidae. It is found in Namibia, Botswana and South Africa.
