= Meharia incurvariella =

Scientific classification
- Domain: Eukaryota
- Kingdom: Animalia
- Phylum: Arthropoda
- Class: Insecta
- Order: Lepidoptera
- Family: Cossidae
- Genus: Meharia
- Species: M. incurvariella

Binomial name
- Meharia incurvariella Chrétien, 1915

Synonyms
- Blalia vittata Rungs, [1943]; Blalia vittata persica Wiltshire, 1946

Species of moth

Meharia incurvariella is a moth in the family Cossidae. It is found in Algeria, Morocco, Iran, Afghanistan and Pakistan.

== Subspecies ==
- Meharia incurvariella incurvariella (Algeria, Morocco)
- Meharia incurvariella persica (Wiltshire, 1946) (Iran, Afghanistan, Pakistan)
