= Azygophleps nubilosa =

Scientific classification
- Kingdom: Animalia
- Phylum: Arthropoda
- Class: Insecta
- Order: Lepidoptera
- Family: Cossidae
- Genus: Azygophleps
- Species: A. nubilosa

Binomial name
- Azygophleps nubilosa Hampson, 1910

Species of moth

Azygophleps nubilosa is a moth in the family Cossidae. It is found in Uganda, Tanzania and South Africa.
