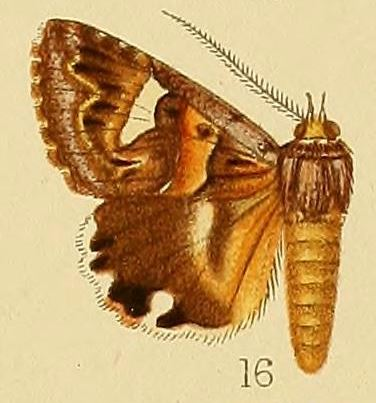

Scientific classification
- Kingdom: Animalia
- Phylum: Arthropoda
- Class: Insecta
- Order: Lepidoptera
- Superfamily: Noctuoidea
- Family: Erebidae
- Tribe: Ophiusini
- Genus: Cerocala; Boisduval, 1829

= Cerocala =

Genus of moths

Cerocala is a genus of moths in the family Erebidae.

== Species ==
- Cerocala albicornis Berio, 1966
- Cerocala albimacula Hampson, 1916
- Cerocala algiriae Oberthür, 1876
- Cerocala basilewskyi Berio, 1954
- Cerocala caelata Karsch, 1896
- Cerocala confusa Warren, 1913
- Cerocala contraria (Walker, 1865)
- Cerocala decaryi Griveaud & Viette, 1962
- Cerocala grandirena Berio, 1954
- Cerocala ilia Viette, 1973
- Cerocala illustrata Holland, 1897
- Cerocala insana Herrich-Schäffer, [1858]
- Cerocala masaica Hampson, 1913
- Cerocala mindingiensis Romieux, 1937
- Cerocala munda Druce, 1900
- Cerocala oppia (Druce, 1900)
- Cerocala orientalis de Joannis, 1912
- Cerocala ratovosoni Viette, 1973
- Cerocala rothschildi Turati, 1924
- Cerocala sana Staudinger, 1901
- Cerocala scapulosa Hübner, [1808]
- Cerocala sokotrensis Hampson, 1899
- Cerocala subrufa Griveaud & Viette, 1962
- Cerocala vermiculosa Herrich-Schäffer, 1858
