= Turatia morettii =

Scientific classification
- Domain: Eukaryota
- Kingdom: Animalia
- Phylum: Arthropoda
- Class: Insecta
- Order: Lepidoptera
- Family: Autostichidae
- Genus: Turatia
- Species: T. morettii

Binomial name
- Turatia morettii (Turati, 1926)

Synonyms
- Holcopogon morettii Turati, 1926

Species of moth

Turatia morettii is a moth in the family Autostichidae. It was described by Turati in 1926. It is found in Libya.
