= Phthorimaea interjuncta =

Scientific classification
- Kingdom: Animalia
- Phylum: Arthropoda
- Class: Insecta
- Order: Lepidoptera
- Family: Gelechiidae
- Genus: Phthorimaea
- Species: P. interjuncta

Binomial name
- Phthorimaea interjuncta Meyrick, 1931

Species of moth

Phthorimaea interjuncta is a moth in the family Gelechiidae. It was described by Edward Meyrick in 1931. It is found in Brazil.
