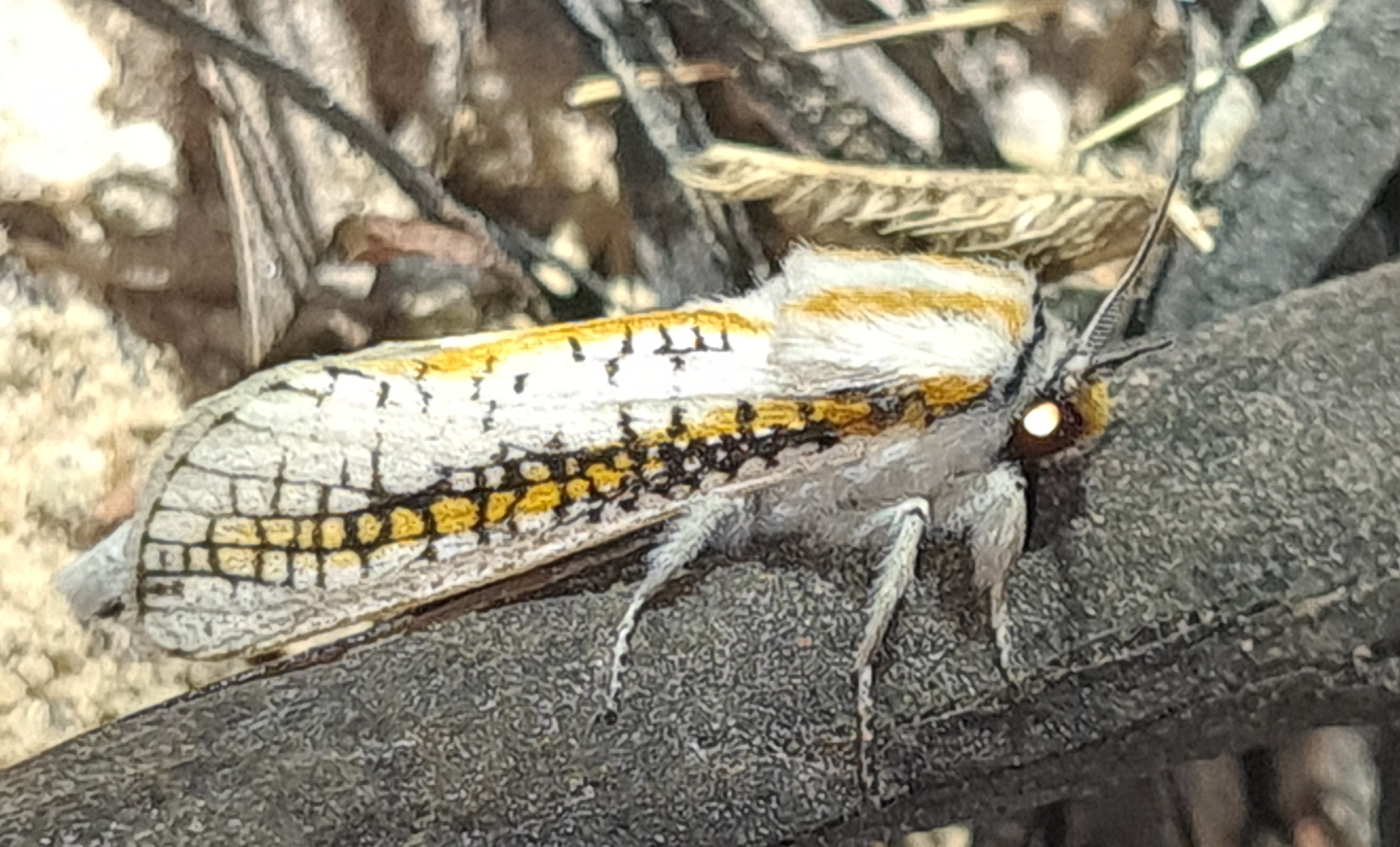

Scientific classification
- Domain: Eukaryota
- Kingdom: Animalia
- Phylum: Arthropoda
- Class: Insecta
- Order: Lepidoptera
- Family: Cossidae
- Genus: Azygophleps
- Species: A. scalaris

Binomial name
- Azygophleps scalaris (Fabricius, 1775)

Synonyms
- Phalaena (Hepialus) scalaris Fabricius, 1775; Zeuzera bivittata Walker, 1865

= Azygophleps scalaris =

Species of moth

Azygophleps scalaris, the sesbania stem borer, is a moth in the family Cossidae found in Pakistan, India, China, Sri Lanka, Myanmar, Thailand, Cambodia, Bangladesh, Mauritania, Somalia, Senegal, The Gambia, Côte d'Ivoire, Ghana, Nigeria, the Democratic Republic of the Congo, Kenya, Angola, Namibia, Tanzania and Sudan.

The larvae feed on Sesbania species. They tunnel through the main stem of the host plant and also feed on the roots and eat the pith region without damaging the epidermis.
