= Turatia namibiella =

Scientific classification
- Domain: Eukaryota
- Kingdom: Animalia
- Phylum: Arthropoda
- Class: Insecta
- Order: Lepidoptera
- Family: Autostichidae
- Genus: Turatia
- Species: T. namibiella

Binomial name
- Turatia namibiella Derra, 2011

Species of insect

Turatia namibiella is a moth in the family Autostichidae. It was described by Georg Derra in 2011. It is found in Namibia.
