= Azygophleps boisduvalii =

Scientific classification
- Kingdom: Animalia
- Phylum: Arthropoda
- Clade: Pancrustacea
- Class: Insecta
- Order: Lepidoptera
- Family: Cossidae
- Genus: Azygophleps
- Species: A. boisduvalii

Binomial name
- Azygophleps boisduvalii (Herrich-Schäffer, 1854)

Synonyms
- Zeuzera boisduvalii Herrich-Schäffer, 1854; Phragmataecia boisduvalii

Species of moth

Azygophleps boisduvalii is a moth in the family Cossidae. It is found in most of Africa (including Guinea, Sierra Leone, Ghana, Cameroon, Nigeria, Sudan, Ethiopia, Kenya, Uganda, the Democratic Republic of the Congo, Zambia, Zimbabwe, Senegal, Malawi and Ivory Coast).
