= Turatia psammella =

Scientific classification
- Domain: Eukaryota
- Kingdom: Animalia
- Phylum: Arthropoda
- Class: Insecta
- Order: Lepidoptera
- Family: Autostichidae
- Genus: Turatia
- Species: T. psammella

Binomial name
- Turatia psammella (Amsel, 1933)

Synonyms
- Holcopogon psammella Amsel, 1933

Species of moth

Turatia psammella is a moth in the family Autostichidae. It was described by Hans Georg Amsel in 1933 and is found in Palestine.
