= Amselia =

Scientific classification
- Kingdom: Animalia
- Phylum: Arthropoda
- Clade: Pancrustacea
- Class: Insecta
- Order: Lepidoptera
- Family: Crambidae
- Subfamily: Crambinae
- Tribe: Crambini
- Genus: Amselia; Bleszynski, 1959

Genus of moths

Amselia is a genus of moths of the family Crambidae. It was established in 1959 by Stanisław Błeszyński.

== Species ==
- Amselia heringi (Amsel, 1935)
- Amselia leucozonellus (Walsingham & Hampson, 1896)
