= Phthorimaea urosema =

Scientific classification
- Kingdom: Animalia
- Phylum: Arthropoda
- Clade: Pancrustacea
- Class: Insecta
- Order: Lepidoptera
- Family: Gelechiidae
- Genus: Phthorimaea
- Species: P. urosema

Binomial name
- Phthorimaea urosema Meyrick, 1917

Synonyms
- Gnorimoschema urosema

Species of moth

Phthorimaea urosema is a moth of the family Gelechiidae. It was originally described from a single adult male specimen from Peru.

The wingspan is about 14 mm. The forewings are greyish-ochreous, somewhat sprinkled irregularly with dark grey. The costa is suffused with dark grey irroration and three or four cloudy blackish-grey dots towards the base on the dorsal half. An oblique, transverse patch of ochreous-whitish suffusion extends from the costa towards the base, followed on the costa by a small blackish spot, and in the disc by an elongate blotch of blackish suffusion. The stigmata are blackish, surrounded by irregular ochreous-whitish suffusion, with the plical obliquely before the first discal. A blotch of blackish suffusion in the middle of the disc lies between and beneath the discal stigmata. Three small ochreous-whitish spots are on the costa towards the apex, interrupting the dark grey irroration. The hindwings are slaty-grey.
