= Phthorimaea suavella =

Scientific classification
- Domain: Eukaryota
- Kingdom: Animalia
- Phylum: Arthropoda
- Class: Insecta
- Order: Lepidoptera
- Family: Gelechiidae
- Genus: Phthorimaea
- Species: P. suavella

Binomial name
- Phthorimaea suavella (Caradja, 1920)

Synonyms
- Lita suavella Caradja, 1920

Species of moth

Phthorimaea suavella is a moth in the family Gelechiidae. It was described by Aristide Caradja in 1920. It is found in Algeria.
