= Azygophleps otello =

Scientific classification
- Kingdom: Animalia
- Phylum: Arthropoda
- Clade: Pancrustacea
- Class: Insecta
- Order: Lepidoptera
- Family: Cossidae
- Genus: Azygophleps
- Species: A. otello

Binomial name
- Azygophleps otello Yakovlev, 2011

Species of moth

Azygophleps otello is a moth in the family Cossidae. It is found in Mauritania.
