= Azygophleps equatorialis =

Scientific classification
- Kingdom: Animalia
- Phylum: Arthropoda
- Clade: Pancrustacea
- Class: Insecta
- Order: Lepidoptera
- Family: Cossidae
- Genus: Azygophleps
- Species: A. equatorialis

Binomial name
- Azygophleps equatorialis Yakovlev, 2011

Species of moth

Azygophleps equatorialis is a moth in the family Cossidae. It was found in the Republic of the Congo.
