= Phthorimaea exacta =

Scientific classification
- Kingdom: Animalia
- Phylum: Arthropoda
- Class: Insecta
- Order: Lepidoptera
- Family: Gelechiidae
- Genus: Phthorimaea
- Species: P. exacta

Binomial name
- Phthorimaea exacta Meyrick, 1917

Species of moth

Phthorimaea exacta is a moth in the family Gelechiidae. It was described by Edward Meyrick in 1917. It is found in Guyana.

The wingspan is 11–12 mm. The forewings are whitish irrorated (sprinkled) with grey and dark fuscous with a small blackish spot beneath the costa near the base, as well as a suffused dark fuscous bar from the dorsum at one-third to above the middle. There are blackish spots on the costa at one-third and before three-fourths, the stigmata are cloudy and black, the plical beneath the first discal, the second discal elongate. There are also blotches of darker suffusion on the tornus and at the apex. The hindwings are grey, darker posteriorly.
