= Phthorimaea involuta =

Scientific classification
- Kingdom: Animalia
- Phylum: Arthropoda
- Class: Insecta
- Order: Lepidoptera
- Family: Gelechiidae
- Genus: Phthorimaea
- Species: P. involuta

Binomial name
- Phthorimaea involuta Meyrick, 1917

Species of moth

Phthorimaea involuta is a moth in the family Gelechiidae. It was described by Edward Meyrick in 1917. It is found in Guyana.

The wingspan is 9–11 mm. The forewings are grey whitish or whitish grey, irrorated (sprinkled) with black and with a narrow oblique blackish bar from the costa near the base and a broader one at one-third, both terminated by small yellow-ochreous spots on the fold edged beneath by black marks, the second spot representing the plical stigma. The discal stigmata are yellow ochreous, edged above and below by black spots, the first obliquely beyond the plical stigma, its margin separated by an ochreous mark from a small blackish spot on the costa above it, the margin of the second usually absorbed in a subquadrate blackish blotch on the costa above it, its lower margin sometimes forming a considerable spot. There is also a well-defined blackish apical blotch. The hindwings are dark grey, subhyaline (almost glass like) in the disc anteriorly and towards the dorsum.
