= Meharia avicenna =

Scientific classification
- Kingdom: Animalia
- Phylum: Arthropoda
- Clade: Pancrustacea
- Class: Insecta
- Order: Lepidoptera
- Family: Cossidae
- Genus: Meharia
- Species: M. avicenna

Binomial name
- Meharia avicenna Yakovlev, 2011

Species of moth

Meharia avicenna is a moth in the family Cossidae. It is found in Iran.
