= Alloclita delozona =

Scientific classification
- Kingdom: Animalia
- Phylum: Arthropoda
- Class: Insecta
- Order: Lepidoptera
- Family: Cosmopterigidae
- Genus: Alloclita
- Species: A. delozona

Binomial name
- Alloclita delozona Meyrick, 1919

Synonyms
- Dhahrania fasciella Amsel, 1958

Species of moth

Alloclita delozona is a moth in the family Cosmopterigidae. It is found from Egypt, Saudi Arabia and the United Arab Emirates to Pakistan and India.

The wingspan is 11–13 mm (0.43–0.51 in). Adults have been recorded from February to March in Saudi Arabia.
