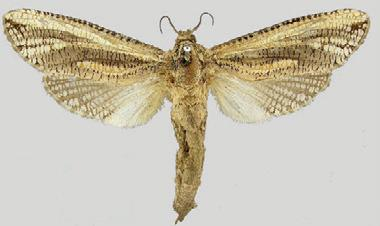
- Azygophleps inclusa, female

Scientific classification
- Kingdom: Animalia
- Phylum: Arthropoda
- Class: Insecta
- Order: Lepidoptera
- Family: Cossidae
- Subfamily: Zeuzerinae
- Tribe: Xyleutini
- Genus: Azygophleps; Hampson, 1892

Species
- See text

Synonyms
- Azygophlebs Aurivillius, 1925

= Azygophleps =

Genus of moths

Azygophleps is a genus of moths belonging to the family Cossidae.

== Description ==
Azygophleps are a genus of medium-sized moths, with long forewings, light-colored hindwings, and a spotted pattern. While similar to other Cossidae genera such as Sansara, Strigocossus, and Aethalopteryx, Azygophleps can be distinguished from these genera through the females' toothed antennae, long forewings that are rounded at the apex, unique genitalia in both sexes, including the absence of arms on the gnathos of the male of the species. Females, additionally, have a star-like symbol on their genitalia.

== Distribution ==
The 28 species of Azygophleps primarily reside throughout Africa, although a few species have been found in Asia and in the Arabian peninsula.

== Species ==
- Azygophleps aburae (Plötz, 1880)
- Azygophleps afghanistanensis (Daniel, 1964)
- Azygophleps albofasciata (Moore, 1879)
- Azygophleps albovittata Bethune-Baker, 1908
- Azygophleps asylas (Cramer, 1779)
- Azygophleps atrifasciata Hampson, 1910
- Azygophleps boisduvalii (Herrich-Schäffer, 1854)
- Azygophleps confucianus Yakovlev, 2006
- Azygophleps cooksoni Pinhey, 1968
- Azygophleps equatorialis Yakovlev, 2011
- Azygophleps ganzelkozikmundi Yakovlev, 2009
- Azygophleps godswindow Yakovlev & Saldaitis, 2011
- Azygophleps inclusa (Walker, 1856)
- Azygophleps kovtunovitchi Yakovlev, 2011
- Azygophleps larseni Yakovlev & Saldaitis, 2011
- Azygophleps legraini Yakovlev & Saldaitis, 2011
- Azygophleps leopardina Distant, 1902
- Azygophleps liliyae Yakovlev, 2011
- Azygophleps liturata (Aurivillius, 1879)
- Azygophleps melanophele Hampson, 1910
- Azygophleps nubilosa Hampson, 1910
- Azygophleps otello Yakovlev, 2011
- Azygophleps pallens (Herrich-Schäffer, [1854])
- Azygophleps pusilla (Walker, 1856)
- Azygophleps regia (Staudinger, 1891)
- Azygophleps scalaris (Fabricius, 1775)
- Azygophleps sheikh Yakovlev & Saldaitis, 2011
- Azygophleps simplex Aurivillius, 1905
- Azygophleps sponda (Wallengren, 1875)
