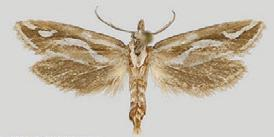
- Meharia hackeri female

Scientific classification
- Kingdom: Animalia
- Phylum: Arthropoda
- Class: Insecta
- Order: Lepidoptera
- Family: Cossidae
- Genus: Meharia; Chrétien, 1915

Species
- See text

Synonyms
- Blalia Rungs, 1943

= Meharia =

Moth genus in family Cossidae

Meharia is a genus of moths belonging to the family Cossidae.

== Diagnosis ==
Meharia is distinguished from all other Cossidae genus by a number of apomorphous characters: the specific “tineoid appearance”, the reduction of the lateral processes of the juxta, the specific dorsolateral sclerotization of the asymmetric aedeagus and the specific ribbon – like epiphysis.

== Description ==
These are small to medium-sized moths, females larger; eyes naked; male and female antennae bipectinate along their length; proboscis reduced; legs long, slender; foretibia bearing a ribbon-like epiphysis; forewing elongate, rounded on the outer margin; forewing pattern has alternate dark and pale spots and bands transversely; hindwing uniform.

== Distribution ==
Eleven species have been reported so far, primarily from the deserts and arid mountains of the Western Palearctic and Africa.

== Species ==
- Meharia acuta Wiltshire, 1982
- Meharia avicenna Yakovlev, 2011
- Meharia baluchestana Alipanah & Yakovlev, 2021
- Meharia fischeri Yakovlev & Saldaitis, 2008
- Meharia hackeri Saldaitis, Ivinskis & Yakovlev, 2011
- Meharia incurvariella Chrétien, 1915
  - Meharia incurvariella incurvariella Chrétien, 1915
  - Meharia incurvariella persica (Wiltshire, 1946)
- Meharia murphyi Yakovlev, 2013
- Meharia philbyi Bradley, 1952
- Meharia scythica D. Komarov et Zolotuhin, 2005
- Meharia semilactea (Warren et Rothschild, 1905)
- Meharia tancredii Sutton, 1963
- Meharia tanganyikae Bradley, 1952
- Meharia yakovlevi Saldaitis & Ivinskis, 2010
