= Meharia tancredii =

Scientific classification
- Domain: Eukaryota
- Kingdom: Animalia
- Phylum: Arthropoda
- Class: Insecta
- Order: Lepidoptera
- Family: Cossidae
- Genus: Meharia
- Species: M. tancredii

Binomial name
- Meharia tancredii Sutton, 1963

Species of moth

Meharia tancredii is a moth in the family Cossidae. It is found in northern Iran.
