= Phthorimaea perfidiosa =

Scientific classification
- Kingdom: Animalia
- Phylum: Arthropoda
- Class: Insecta
- Order: Lepidoptera
- Family: Gelechiidae
- Genus: Phthorimaea
- Species: P. perfidiosa

Binomial name
- Phthorimaea perfidiosa Meyrick, 1917

Species of moth

Phthorimaea perfidiosa is a moth in the family Gelechiidae. It was described by Edward Meyrick in 1917. It is found in Colombia and on the Galápagos Islands.

The wingspan is about 10 millimetres (0.39 in). The forewings are grey whitish sprinkled with grey and dark fuscous, more strongly irrorated (sprinkled) along the costa and with the plical stigma rather large and blackish. The hindwings are bluish grey with a strong ochreous-yellowish expansible hair-pencil from the base lying along the costa to beyond the middle.
