= Azygophleps pusilla =

Scientific classification
- Kingdom: Animalia
- Phylum: Arthropoda
- Class: Insecta
- Order: Lepidoptera
- Family: Cossidae
- Genus: Azygophleps
- Species: A. pusilla

Binomial name
- Azygophleps pusilla (Walker, 1856)

Synonyms
- Zeuzera pusilla Walker, 1856

Species of moth

Azygophleps pusilla is a moth in the family Cossidae found in India.
