= Stiphrometasia petryi =

Scientific classification
- Kingdom: Animalia
- Phylum: Arthropoda
- Clade: Pancrustacea
- Class: Insecta
- Order: Lepidoptera
- Family: Crambidae
- Genus: Stiphrometasia
- Species: S. petryi

Binomial name
- Stiphrometasia petryi Amsel, 1935

Species of moth

Stiphrometasia petryi is a moth in the family Crambidae. It is found in Israel and the Palestinian territories.
