= Phthorimaea euchthonia =

Scientific classification
- Kingdom: Animalia
- Phylum: Arthropoda
- Class: Insecta
- Order: Lepidoptera
- Family: Gelechiidae
- Genus: Phthorimaea
- Species: P. euchthonia

Binomial name
- Phthorimaea euchthonia Meyrick, 1939

Species of moth

Phthorimaea euchthonia is a moth in the family Gelechiidae. It was described by Edward Meyrick in 1939. It is found in Argentina.
