= Alloclita deprinsi =

Scientific classification
- Kingdom: Animalia
- Phylum: Arthropoda
- Clade: Pancrustacea
- Class: Insecta
- Order: Lepidoptera
- Family: Cosmopterigidae
- Genus: Alloclita
- Species: A. deprinsi

Binomial name
- Alloclita deprinsi Koster & Sinev, 2003

Species of moth

Alloclita deprinsi is a moth in the family Cosmopterigidae. It is found in Asia Minor.

The wingspan is 11–13 millimetres (0.43–0.51 in). Adults have been recorded in May and August.
