= Azygophleps godswindow =

Scientific classification
- Kingdom: Animalia
- Phylum: Arthropoda
- Clade: Pancrustacea
- Class: Insecta
- Order: Lepidoptera
- Family: Cossidae
- Genus: Azygophleps
- Species: A. godswindow

Binomial name
- Azygophleps godswindow Yakovlev & Saldaitis, 2011

Species of moth

Azygophleps godswindow is a moth in the family Cossidae. It is found in South Africa.
