= Stiphrometasia monialis =

Scientific classification
- Kingdom: Animalia
- Phylum: Arthropoda
- Clade: Pancrustacea
- Class: Insecta
- Order: Lepidoptera
- Family: Crambidae
- Genus: Stiphrometasia
- Species: S. monialis

Binomial name
- Stiphrometasia monialis (Erschoff, 1872)

Synonyms
- Botys monialis Erschoff, 1872

Species of moth

Stiphrometasia monialis is a moth in the family Crambidae. It is found in India, Iran, Iraq, Turkmenistan, Uzbekistan and the United Arab Emirates.
