= Azygophleps afghanistanensis =

Scientific classification
- Domain: Eukaryota
- Kingdom: Animalia
- Phylum: Arthropoda
- Class: Insecta
- Order: Lepidoptera
- Family: Cossidae
- Genus: Azygophleps
- Species: A. afghanistanensis

Binomial name
- Azygophleps afghanistanensis (Daniel, 1964)

Synonyms
- Zeuzera regia afghanistanensis Daniel, 1964

Species of moth

Azygophleps afghanistanensis is a moth in the family Cossidae. It is found in Afghanistan.
