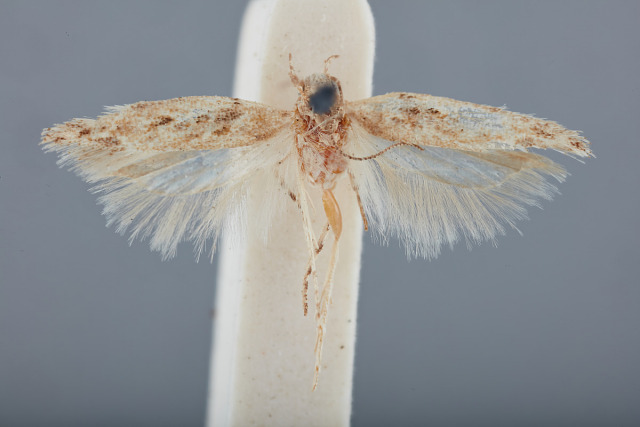

Scientific classification
- Kingdom: Animalia
- Phylum: Arthropoda
- Clade: Pancrustacea
- Class: Insecta
- Order: Lepidoptera
- Family: Cosmopterigidae
- Genus: Alloclita
- Species: A. brachygrapta

Binomial name
- Alloclita brachygrapta Meyrick, 1925

= Alloclita brachygrapta =

Species of moth

Alloclita brachygrapta is a moth in the family Cosmopterigidae. It is found in the Sinai Peninsula of Egypt . The species was described on the basis of two males in the collection of the Natural History Museum in London.

The wingspan is 11–12 mm (0.43–0.47 in). Adults have been recorded in September.
