= Turatia iranica =

Scientific classification
- Kingdom: Animalia
- Phylum: Arthropoda
- Clade: Pancrustacea
- Class: Insecta
- Order: Lepidoptera
- Family: Autostichidae
- Genus: Turatia
- Species: T. iranica

Binomial name
- Turatia iranica Gozmány, 2000

Species of moth

Turatia iranica is a moth in the family Autostichidae. It was described by László Anthony Gozmány in 2000. It is found in Oman, the United Arab Emirates and Iran.
