= Alloclita mongolica =

Scientific classification
- Kingdom: Animalia
- Phylum: Arthropoda
- Clade: Pancrustacea
- Class: Insecta
- Order: Lepidoptera
- Family: Cosmopterigidae
- Genus: Alloclita
- Species: A. mongolica

Binomial name
- Alloclita mongolica Sinev, 1993

Species of moth

Alloclita mongolica is a moth in the family Cosmopterigidae. It was described by Sinev in 1993. It is found in Mongolia.
