= Stiphrometasia =

Scientific classification
- Kingdom: Animalia
- Phylum: Arthropoda
- Clade: Pancrustacea
- Class: Insecta
- Order: Lepidoptera
- Family: Crambidae
- Subfamily: Cybalomiinae
- Genus: Stiphrometasia; Zerny, 1914

Genus of moths

Stiphrometasia is a genus of moths of the family Crambidae.

== Species ==
- Stiphrometasia monialis (Erschoff, 1872)
- Stiphrometasia pavonialis (Walsingham & Hampson, 1896)
- Stiphrometasia petryi Amsel, 1935
- Stiphrometasia pharaonalis Caradja, 1916
- Stiphrometasia sancta (Hampson, 1900)
