= Turatia scioneura =

Scientific classification
- Kingdom: Animalia
- Phylum: Arthropoda
- Class: Insecta
- Order: Lepidoptera
- Family: Autostichidae
- Genus: Turatia
- Species: T. scioneura

Binomial name
- Turatia scioneura (Meyrick, 1929)

Synonyms
- Holcopogon scioneura Meyrick, 1929

Species of moth

Turatia scioneura is a moth in the family Autostichidae. It was described by Edward Meyrick in 1929. It is found in Sudan.

The wingspan is about 19 mm.
