= Phthorimaea impudica =

Scientific classification
- Domain: Eukaryota
- Kingdom: Animalia
- Phylum: Arthropoda
- Class: Insecta
- Order: Lepidoptera
- Family: Gelechiidae
- Genus: Phthorimaea
- Species: P. impudica

Binomial name
- Phthorimaea impudica Walsingham, 1911

Species of moth

Phthorimaea impudica is a moth in the family Gelechiidae. It was described by Thomas de Grey, 6th Baron Walsingham, in 1911. It is found in Panama.

The wingspan is about 10.5 mm. The forewings are dull white, much sprinkled and suffused with pale greyish fuscous, among which are some slightly raised black scales. The extreme base of the costa is whitish, but beyond it the margin is stained with brown, three times narrowly interrupted by the pale ground-colour, thus broken into a series of three or four outwardly diminishing elongate costal spots. A short ochreous length-streak occurs near the base, below the costa, and at one-third are two small patches of raised, black, whitish tipped scales, one below the fold the other below the costa. At the end of the cell is a small fuscous stain, accompanied by a few ochreous scales, the apical portion and cilia being much dusted with greyish fuscous. The hindwings are grey.
