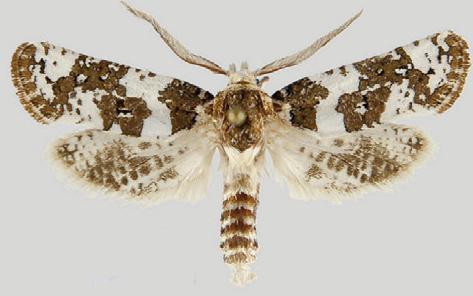
- Male

Scientific classification
- Kingdom: Animalia
- Phylum: Arthropoda
- Clade: Pancrustacea
- Class: Insecta
- Order: Lepidoptera
- Family: Cossidae
- Genus: Meharia
- Species: M. yakovlevi

Binomial name
- Meharia yakovlevi Saldaitis & Ivinskis, 2010

= Meharia yakovlevi =

Species of moth

Meharia yakovlevi is a moth in the family Cossidae. It is found in Socotra, Yemen.
