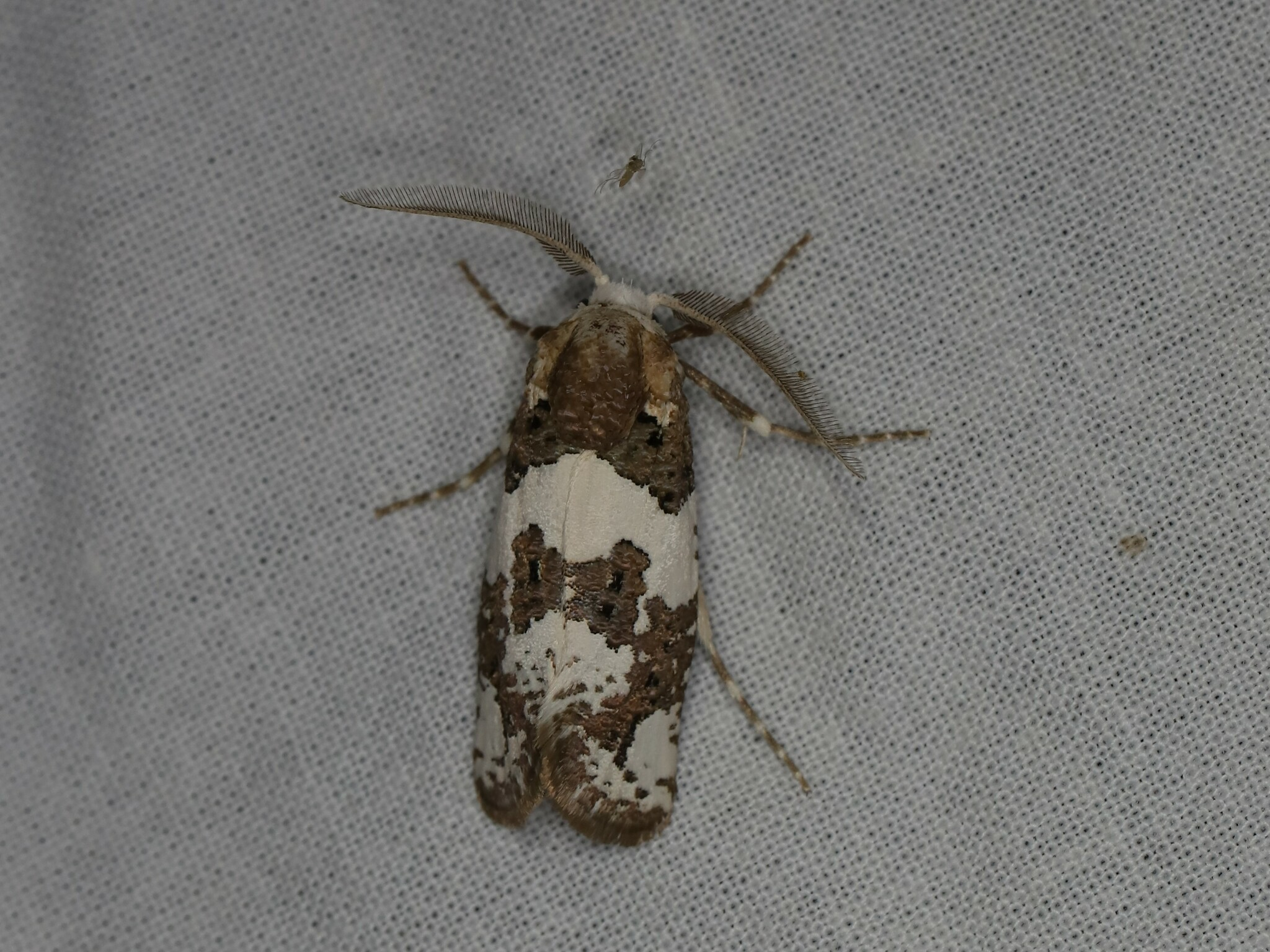

Scientific classification
- Kingdom: Animalia
- Phylum: Arthropoda
- Clade: Pancrustacea
- Class: Insecta
- Order: Lepidoptera
- Family: Cossidae
- Genus: Meharia
- Species: M. semilactea

Binomial name
- Meharia semilactea (Warren et Rothschild, 1905)

Synonyms
- Alavona semilactea Warren et Rothschild, 1905

= Meharia semilactea =

Species of moth

Meharia semilactea is a species of moth in the family Cossidae. It is found in Israel, Jordan, Saudi Arabia, Oman, the United Arab Emirates, Yemen, Egypt (the Sinai Peninsula), northern Sudan, Morocco and Mauritania.

== Description ==
The wingspan is 18–30 mm. The forewings are cream white with olive-brown markings, consisting of a basal patch with a curved outer edge and a postmedian fascia of irregular shape. The hindwings are brown grey, but whitish towards the base. The underside is olive grey brown, varied with ochreous white. The head, palpi and shoulders are white and the antennae are grey. The thorax and abdomen are white, partly mixed with olive grey. Adults have been recorded on wing from October to December in Jordan and on the Sinai Peninsula.
