= Alloclita gambiella =

Scientific classification
- Kingdom: Animalia
- Phylum: Arthropoda
- Class: Insecta
- Order: Lepidoptera
- Family: Cosmopterigidae
- Genus: Alloclita
- Species: A. gambiella

Binomial name
- Alloclita gambiella (Walsingham, 1891)

Synonyms
- Laverna gambiella Walsingham, 1891

Species of moth

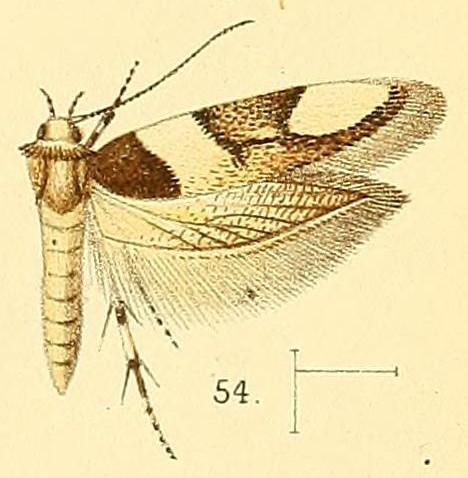
Alloclita gambiella

Alloclita gambiella is a moth in the family Cosmopterigidae. It was described by Walsingham in 1891. It is found in Gambia and Yemen. Specimens have been collected from Malvaceae in November and December.
