= Alloclita recisella =

Scientific classification
- Domain: Eukaryota
- Kingdom: Animalia
- Phylum: Arthropoda
- Class: Insecta
- Order: Lepidoptera
- Family: Cosmopterigidae
- Genus: Alloclita
- Species: A. recisella

Binomial name
- Alloclita recisella Staudinger, 1859

Synonyms
- Borkhausenia albocinctella Chretien, 1915; Mompha gelechiformis Turati, 1930; Tinea inconspicuella Turati, 1930; Alloclita orthoclina Meyrick, 1922

Species of moth

Alloclita recisella is a moth in the family Cosmopterigidae. It is found in Portugal, Spain, Greece and on Corsica, Sicily and Cyprus. It has also been recorded from Israel.

The wingspan is 13–15 mm. Adults have been recorded in May and from July to September.
