= Phthorimaea molitor =

Scientific classification
- Domain: Eukaryota
- Kingdom: Animalia
- Phylum: Arthropoda
- Class: Insecta
- Order: Lepidoptera
- Family: Gelechiidae
- Genus: Phthorimaea
- Species: P. molitor

Binomial name
- Phthorimaea molitor (Walsingham, 1896)

Synonyms
- Gelechia molitor Walsingham, 1896

Species of moth

Phthorimaea molitor is a moth in the family Gelechiidae. It was described by Thomas de Grey, 6th Baron Walsingham, in 1896. It is found in Yemen.

The wingspan is about 14 mm. The forewings are meal-white with some indication of a darker shade above the base of the fold, a slight greyish shade spot at the end of the cell and some very faint greyish shade spots around the termen at the base of the costal and terminal cilia, which are also meal-white. The hindwings are somewhat iridescent, greyish white.
