= Meharia philbyi =

Scientific classification
- Domain: Eukaryota
- Kingdom: Animalia
- Phylum: Arthropoda
- Class: Insecta
- Order: Lepidoptera
- Family: Cossidae
- Genus: Meharia
- Species: M. philbyi

Binomial name
- Meharia philbyi Bradley, 1952

Species of moth

Meharia philbyi is a moth in the family Cossidae. It is found in Saudi Arabia, Yemen and Oman.
