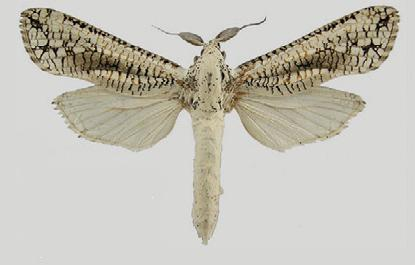
- Male
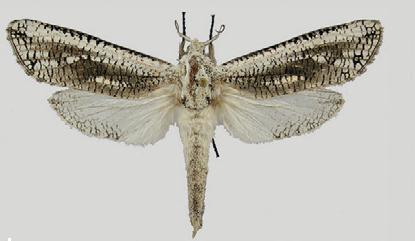
- Female

Scientific classification
- Kingdom: Animalia
- Phylum: Arthropoda
- Clade: Pancrustacea
- Class: Insecta
- Order: Lepidoptera
- Family: Cossidae
- Genus: Azygophleps
- Species: A. larseni

Binomial name
- Azygophleps larseni Yakovlev & Saldaitis, 2011

= Azygophleps larseni =

Species of moth

Azygophleps larseni is a moth in the family Cossidae. It is found throughout the Arabian Peninsula.
