= Coleophora recula =

Scientific classification
- Kingdom: Animalia
- Phylum: Arthropoda
- Clade: Pancrustacea
- Class: Insecta
- Order: Lepidoptera
- Family: Coleophoridae
- Genus: Coleophora
- Species: C. recula

Binomial name
- Coleophora recula Baldizzone, 2007

Species of moth

Coleophora recula is a moth of the family Coleophoridae. It is found in Yemen.

The wingspan is about 6 mm.
