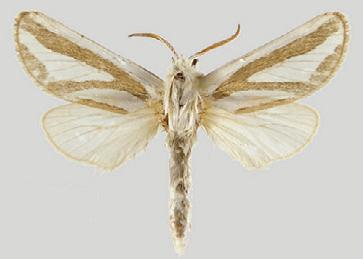
- Male
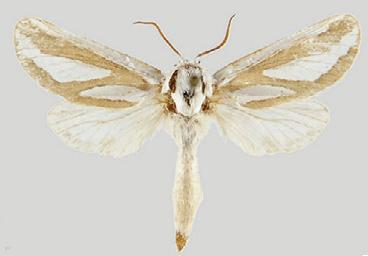
- Female

Scientific classification
- Kingdom: Animalia
- Phylum: Arthropoda
- Class: Insecta
- Order: Lepidoptera
- Family: Cossidae
- Genus: Mormogystia
- Species: M. proleuca

Binomial name
- Mormogystia proleuca (Hampson in Walsingham et Hampson, 1896)

Synonyms
- Eremocossus proleuca Hampson in Walsingham et Hampson, 1896

= Mormogystia proleuca =

Species of moth

Mormogystia proleuca is a species of moth in the family Cossidae. It is found in the southern part of the Arabian Peninsula, including southern Saudi Arabia (the Asir Mountains), southern Oman (Dhofar) and Yemen.

The wingspan is 25–29 mm. The ground colour of the forewings is brown. The head, thorax and abdomen are light yellow.

The larvae feed on Acacia species.
