= Azygophleps sheikh =

Scientific classification
- Kingdom: Animalia
- Phylum: Arthropoda
- Clade: Pancrustacea
- Class: Insecta
- Order: Lepidoptera
- Family: Cossidae
- Genus: Azygophleps
- Species: A. sheikh

Binomial name
- Azygophleps sheikh Yakovlev & Saldaitis, 2011

Species of moth

Azygophleps sheikh is a moth in the family Cossidae found in Saudi Arabia and Yemen.
