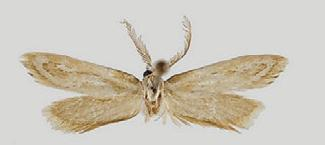
- Male

Scientific classification
- Kingdom: Animalia
- Phylum: Arthropoda
- Class: Insecta
- Order: Lepidoptera
- Family: Cossidae
- Genus: Meharia
- Species: M. acuta

Binomial name
- Meharia acuta Wiltshire, 1982

= Meharia acuta =

Species of moth

Meharia acuta is a moth in the family Cossidae. It is found in Saudi Arabia, Oman and Yemen.
