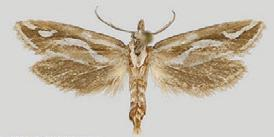
- Female

Scientific classification
- Kingdom: Animalia
- Phylum: Arthropoda
- Clade: Pancrustacea
- Class: Insecta
- Order: Lepidoptera
- Family: Cossidae
- Genus: Meharia
- Species: M. hackeri

Binomial name
- Meharia hackeri Saldaitis, Ivinskis & Yakovlev, 2011

= Meharia hackeri =

Species of moth

Meharia hackeri is a moth in the family Cossidae. It is found in Socotra, Yemen.

The wingspan is 21–22 mm. The ground colour of the forewings is yellowish brown with white longitudinal fascia forming the wing pattern.

== Taxonomy ==
The species is named after Hermann Hacker, a German lepidopterist who studied the macromoths of the Arabian Peninsula and Africa.

== Description ==
The holotype female's costal margin is 10 mm long, with a wingspan of 21 mm. Paratypes have slightly longer forewings at 11 mm and a wingspan of 22 mm. The antennae are a bit longer than half the forewing length, bipectinate, and white in color with black at the base. The head and tegulae are yellowish-white. The labial palps are yellowish-brown with white at the base.

The forewings are yellowish-brown with white stripes forming the wing pattern. A straight white stripe starts at the base along the costal edge and runs up to one-fourth of the wing length. Another curved stripe begins at the inner margin and extends to two-thirds of the wing length, ending at the wing tip. These stripes are bordered by dark brown scales with black spots in the middle and terminal areas. A narrow white stripe runs along the inner margin, interrupted widely before the middle and narrowly near the tornus. The cilia are yellowish-white, and the underside of the forewing is brown. The hindwings are greyish-yellow with light brown fringes and brown undersides.

In the female genitalia, the papilla analis is triangular and covered with short, thin, but very long setae. The rear apophysisis about the same length as the papilla analis. The front apophysis is much shorter and wider, ending in a V-shaped hardened area. The opening (ostium) is sunken in. The base of the antrum is lightly hardened and forms a loop that leads into a very narrow ductus bursae. The corpus bursae is soft, not hardened (sclerotised), and looks like a small pouch.

The appearance of the male is unknown.

== Distribution ==
Meharia hackeri is known only from the central part of Socotra and is likely endemic to the island. Specimens were collected in the central part of the country in an oasis-type valley dominated by various tree and shrub species. Females are strongly attracted to light and appear to have a very local distribution.
