= Scythris sanae =

Scientific classification
- Kingdom: Animalia
- Phylum: Arthropoda
- Clade: Pancrustacea
- Class: Insecta
- Order: Lepidoptera
- Family: Scythrididae
- Genus: Scythris
- Species: S. sanae

Binomial name
- Scythris sanae Bengtsson, 2002

Species of moth

Scythris sanae is a moth of the family Scythrididae. It was described by Bengt Å. Bengtsson in 2002.

== Distribution ==
It is found in Yemen.
