= Stiphrometasia pavonialis =

Scientific classification
- Kingdom: Animalia
- Phylum: Arthropoda
- Clade: Pancrustacea
- Class: Insecta
- Order: Lepidoptera
- Family: Crambidae
- Genus: Stiphrometasia
- Species: S. pavonialis

Binomial name
- Stiphrometasia pavonialis (Walsingham & Hampson, 1896)

Synonyms
- Eromene pavonialis Walsingham & Hampson, 1896

Species of moth

Stiphrometasia pavonialis is a moth in the family Crambidae. It is found in Yemen.
