= Scythris lamprochalca =

Scientific classification
- Kingdom: Animalia
- Phylum: Arthropoda
- Class: Insecta
- Order: Lepidoptera
- Family: Scythrididae
- Genus: Scythris
- Species: S. lamprochalca

Binomial name
- Scythris lamprochalca Meyrick, 1931

Synonyms
- Scythris aphanatma Meyrick, 1933; Scythris badiella Bengtsson, 2002

Species of moth

Scythris lamprochalca is a moth of the family Scythrididae. It was described by Edward Meyrick in 1931. It is found in Ethiopia, Uganda and Yemen.
