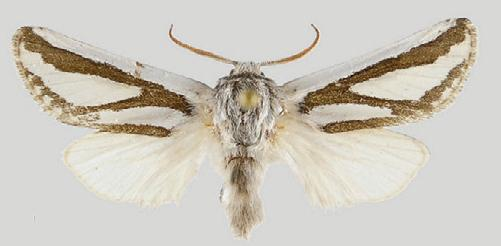
- Male
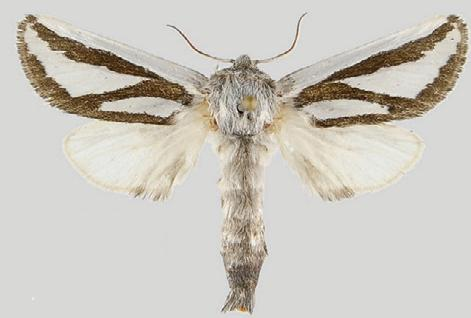
- Female

Scientific classification
- Kingdom: Animalia
- Phylum: Arthropoda
- Clade: Pancrustacea
- Class: Insecta
- Order: Lepidoptera
- Family: Cossidae
- Genus: Mormogystia
- Species: M. brandstetteri

Binomial name
- Mormogystia brandstetteri Saldaitis, Ivinskis & Yakovlev, 2011

= Mormogystia brandstetteri =

Species of moth

Mormogystia brandstetteri is a moth in the family Cossidae. It is endemic to the Socotra Archipelago, part of Yemen in the Indian Ocean. The wingspan is 33–35 mm. The ground colour of the forewings is black. The head, thorax and abdomen are intense grey. There is a black costal spot on the ventral hindwing. The larvae probably feed on Acacia species.

== Taxonomy ==
Mormogystia brandstetteri was described by the entomologists Aidas Saldaitis and colleagues in 2011 on the basis of an adult male specimen collected from the Diksam Plateau on the island of Socotra in Yemen. The species is named after Johann Brandstetter, a German painter and entomologist.

== Description ==
In males, the mean forewing length is 16 mm and the mean wingspan is 35 mm. The head, thorax, abdomen, and tegulae are grey. The antennae are bipectinate and roughly half the length of the forewing. The forewing is black with a white silvery pattern made up of three white silvery patches. A fascia of even width runs along the entire costal margin, with the median fascia widening medially and reaching the outer margin of the forewing. The lower silver patch originates at the basal edge and extends along dorsal wing margin to middle. This patch is enclosed by ground colour. The adterminal line is white and the fringe is grey. The dorsal surface of the forewing is greyish-white, with greyish-black costal, outer, and dorsal margins. The hindwing is uniformly white with a greyish-black spot at the costal margin.

Females have a forewing length of 23 mm and a wingspan of 48 mm. The antennae are filiform, but the wing pattern is similar to that of males. Some intraspecific variation is occurs in the species, with some individuals having no adterminal line, differently shaped silvery patches, and grey hindwings.

In the male genitalia, the uncus is broad, slightly narrower than its length, with a wide and gently rounded tip. The arms of the gnathos are long and robust, forming a very broad gnathos with a rounded apex. The saccus tapers gradually and ends in a pointed denticle. The valvae are symmetrical, with straight edges that widen toward the tip, which is flat. The costal margin is heavily and broadly sclerotized. The transtilla has medium-sized, strong, denticle-shaped arms. The juxta is large, well-sclerotized, and shaped like a belt, featuring a small notch at the tip and a prominent boat-shaped margin at the base. The aedeagus is strong, straight, and large, expanding at the base. The vesica is simple and broad, without any cornuti.

In the female genitalia, the papilla analis is narrow and covered with short, fine setae. The posterior apophysis is about 1.4 times longer than the anterior apophysis. The antevaginal plate is shaped like a belt, tapering to pointed ends. The ductus bursae is sclerotized), while the corpus bursae is long, narrow, and soft. No signa are present.

== Distribution and ecology ==
The species is found across the island of Socotra in almost every habitat, as well as on the smaller islands of Samhah and Abd al Kuri in the same archipelago. Acacia is a likely food plant for M. brandstetteri as larvae of other closely related species are known to do so. The moth is especially abundant in the central part of the island in deeper canyons or rich oasis-like valleys, where forests have not yet been cut for fuel like elsewhere on the island.
