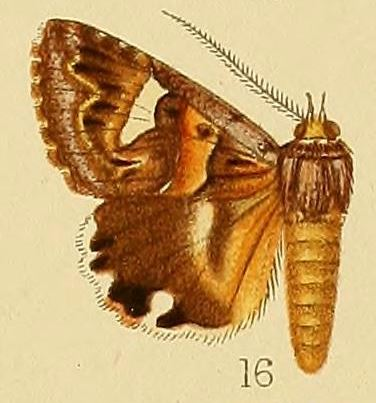

Scientific classification
- Kingdom: Animalia
- Phylum: Arthropoda
- Class: Insecta
- Order: Lepidoptera
- Superfamily: Noctuoidea
- Family: Erebidae
- Genus: Cerocala
- Species: C. sokotrensis

Binomial name
- Cerocala sokotrensis Hampson, 1899

Synonyms
- Cerocala socotrensis Hampson, 1913

= Cerocala sokotrensis =

Species of moth

Cerocala sokotrensis is a moth of the family Erebidae.

== Distribution ==
It is found in Yemen (Sokotra).
