= Coleophora taizensis =

Scientific classification
- Kingdom: Animalia
- Phylum: Arthropoda
- Clade: Pancrustacea
- Class: Insecta
- Order: Lepidoptera
- Family: Coleophoridae
- Genus: Coleophora
- Species: C. taizensis

Binomial name
- Coleophora taizensis Baldizzone, 2007

Species of moth

Coleophora taizensis is a moth of the family Coleophoridae. It is found in Yemen.

The wingspan is 8–9 mm.
