= Amselia leucozonellus =

Scientific classification
- Kingdom: Animalia
- Phylum: Arthropoda
- Clade: Pancrustacea
- Class: Insecta
- Order: Lepidoptera
- Family: Crambidae
- Subfamily: Crambinae
- Tribe: Crambini
- Genus: Amselia
- Species: A. leucozonellus

Binomial name
- Amselia leucozonellus (Walsingham & Hampson, 1896)

Synonyms
- Crambus leucozonellus Walsingham & Hampson, 1896

Species of moth

Amselia leucozonellus is a moth in the family Crambidae. It was described by Walsingham and Hampson in 1896. It is found in Yemen.
