= Turatia yemenensis =

Scientific classification
- Domain: Eukaryota
- Kingdom: Animalia
- Phylum: Arthropoda
- Class: Insecta
- Order: Lepidoptera
- Family: Autostichidae
- Genus: Turatia
- Species: T. yemenensis

Binomial name
- Turatia yemenensis Derra, 2008

Species of moth

Turatia yemenensis is a moth in the family Autostichidae. It was described by Georg Derra in 2008. It is found in Yemen.
