= Coleophora yemenita =

Scientific classification
- Kingdom: Animalia
- Phylum: Arthropoda
- Clade: Pancrustacea
- Class: Insecta
- Order: Lepidoptera
- Family: Coleophoridae
- Genus: Coleophora
- Species: C. yemenita

Binomial name
- Coleophora yemenita Baldizzone, 2007

Species of moth

Coleophora yemenita is a moth of the family Coleophoridae. It is found in Yemen.

The wingspan is about 10.5 mm.
