= List of moths of Oman =

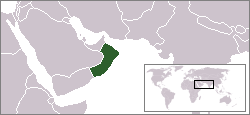
Location of Oman

Moths of Oman represent about 190 known moth species. The moths (mostly nocturnal) and butterflies (mostly diurnal) together make up the taxonomic order Lepidoptera.

This is a list of moth species which have been recorded in Oman.

== Arctiidae ==
- Lepista arabica (Rebel, 1907)
- Siccia dudai Ivinskis & Saldaitis, 2008
- Teracotona murtafaa Wiltshire, 1980

== Autostichidae ==
- Turatia iranica Gozmány, 2000

== Coleophoridae ==
- Coleophora aegyptiacae Walsingham, 1907
- Coleophora arachnias Meyrick, 1922
- Coleophora aularia Meyrick, 1924
- Coleophora eilatica Baldizzone, 1994
- Coleophora jerusalemella Toll, 1942
- Coleophora microalbella Amsel, 1935
- Coleophora niphomesta Meyrick, 1917
- Coleophora omanica Baldizzone, 2007
- Coleophora sogdianae Baldizzone, 1994
- Coleophora teheranella Baldizzone, 1994
- Coleophora versurella Zeller, 1849

== Cossidae ==
- Azygophleps larseni Yakovlev & Saldaitis, 2011
- Meharia acuta Wiltshire, 1982
- Meharia philbyi Bradley, 1952
- Meharia semilactea (Warren et Rothschild, 1905)
- Mormogystia proleuca (Hampson in Walsingham et Hampson, 1896)

== Crambidae ==
- Heliothela ophideresana (Walker, 1863)

== Geometridae ==
- Brachyglossina sciasmatica Brandt, 1941
- Cleora nana Hausmann & Skou, 2008
- Eupithecia mekrana Brandt, 1941
- Eupithecia ultimaria Boisduval, 1840
- Hemithea punctifimbria Warren, 1896
- Idaea eremica (Brandt, 1941)
- Idaea gallagheri Wiltshire, 1983
- Idaea granulosa (Warren & Rothschild, 1905)
- Idaea illustris (Brandt, 1941)
- Palaeaspilates sublutearia (Wiltshire, 1977)
- Pasiphila palaearctica (Brandt, 1938)
- Scopula caesaria (Walker, 1861)
- Traminda mundissima (Walker, 1861)
- Xanthorhoe rhodoides (Brandt, 1941)
- Xanthorhoe wiltshirei (Brandt, 1941)

== Gracillariidae ==
- Phyllonorycter jabalshamsi de Prins, 2012

== Lasiocampidae ==
- Sena augustasi Zolotuhin, Saldaitis & Ivinskis, 2009

== Limacodidae ==
- Deltoptera omana Wiltshire, 1976

== Metarbelidae ==
- Salagena guichardi Wiltshire, 1980

== Micronoctuidae ==
- Micronola wadicola Amsel, 1935

== Nepticulidae ==
- Stigmella birgittae Gustafsson, 1985

== Noctuidae ==
- Acantholipes circumdata (Walker, 1858)
- Achaea catella Guenée, 1852
- Acontia akbar Wiltshire, 1985
- Acontia asbenensis (Rothschild, 1921)
- Acontia basifera Walker, 1857
- Acontia binominata (Butler, 1892)
- Acontia imitatrix Wallengren, 1856
- Acontia minuscula Hacker, Legrain & Fibiger, 2010
- Acontia peksi Hacker, Legrain & Fibiger, 2008
- Acontia philbyi Wiltshire, 1988
- Acontia porphyrea (Butler, 1898)
- Acontia saldaitis Hacker, Legrain & Fibiger, 2010
- Acontia solitaria Hacker, Legrain & Fibiger, 2008
- Acontia tabberti Hacker, Legrain & Fibiger, 2010
- Adisura callima Bethune-Baker, 1911
- Aegocera brevivitta Hampson, 1901
- Agrotis biconica Kollar, 1844
- Agrotis ipsilon (Hufnagel, 1766)
- Amyna axis Guenée, 1852
- Amyna punctum (Fabricius, 1794)
- Anarta trifolii (Hufnagel, 1766)
- Androlymnia clavata Hampson, 1910
- Anoba triangularis (Warnecke, 1938)
- Anomis flava (Fabricius, 1775)
- Anomis sabulifera (Guenée, 1852)
- Antarchaea conicephala (Staudinger, 1870)
- Antarchaea erubescens (Bang-Haas, 1910)
- Antarchaea fragilis (Butler, 1875)
- Anumeta spilota (Erschoff, 1874)
- Argyrogramma signata (Fabricius, 1775)
- Armada gallagheri Wiltshire, 1985
- Athetis pigra (Guenée, 1852)
- Brevipecten hypocornuta Hacker & Fibiger, 2007
- Callopistria latreillei (Duponchel, 1827)
- Caradrina eremicola (Plante, 1997)
- Caradrina soudanensis (Hampson, 1918)
- Caranilla uvarovi (Wiltshire, 1949)
- Chrysodeixis acuta (Walker, [1858])
- Chrysodeixis chalcites (Esper, 1789)
- Clytie infrequens (Swinhoe, 1884)
- Clytie tropicalis Rungs, 1975
- Condica capensis (Guenée, 1852)
- Condica illecta Walker, 1865
- Condica viscosa (Freyer, 1831)
- Ctenoplusia fracta (Walker, 1857)
- Ctenoplusia limbirena (Guenée, 1852)
- Drasteria kabylaria (Bang-Haas, 1906)
- Dysgonia angularis (Boisduval, 1833)
- Dysgonia torrida (Guenée, 1852)
- Eublemma anachoresis (Wallengren, 1863)
- Eublemma apicipunctalis (Brandt, 1939)
- Eublemma khonoides Wiltshire, 1980
- Eublemma odontophora Hampson, 1910
- Eublemma parva (Hübner, [1808])
- Eublemma roseana (Moore, 1881)
- Eublemma seminivea Hampson, 1896
- Eublemma siticuosa (Lederer, 1858)
- Eulocastra alfierii Wiltshire, 1948
- Eutelia adulatrix (Hübner, 1813)
- Feliniopsis consummata (Walker, 1857)
- Feliniopsis talhouki (Wiltshire, 1983)
- Gnamptonyx innexa (Walker, 1858)
- Hadjina tyriobaphes Wiltshire, 1983
- Haplocestra similis Aurivillius, 1910
- Helicoverpa armigera (Hübner, [1808])
- Heliocheilus confertissima (Walker, 1865)
- Heliothis nubigera Herrich-Schäffer, 1851
- Heliothis peltigera ([Denis & Schiffermüller], 1775)
- Heteropalpia acrosticta (Püngeler, 1904)
- Heteropalpia exarata (Mabille, 1890)
- Heteropalpia robusta Wiltshire, 1988
- Heteropalpia vetusta (Walker, 1865)
- Hypena abyssinialis Guenée, 1854
- Hypena laceratalis Walker, 1859
- Hypena lividalis (Hübner, 1790)
- Hypena obacerralis Walker, [1859]
- Hypena obsitalis (Hübner, [1813])
- Hypotacha isthmigera Wiltshire, 1968
- Hypotacha ochribasalis (Hampson, 1896)
- Hypotacha raffaldii Berio, 1939
- Iambiodes postpallida Wiltshire, 1977
- Leucania loreyi (Duponchel, 1827)
- Lophoptera arabica Hacker & Fibiger, 2006
- Lyncestoides unilinea (Swinhoe, 1885)
- Marathyssa cuneata (Saalmüller, 1891)
- Masalia galatheae (Wallengren, 1856)
- Metopoceras kneuckeri (Rebel, 1903)
- Mimasura dhofarica Wiltshire, 1985
- Mimasura larseni Wiltshire, 1985
- Mocis proverai Zilli, 2000
- Nagia natalensis (Hampson, 1902)
- Nimasia brachyura Wiltshire, 1982
- Oedicodia jarsisi Wiltshire, 1985
- Ophiusa dianaris (Guenée, 1852)
- Ophiusa mejanesi (Guenée, 1852)
- Oraesia emarginata (Fabricius, 1794)
- Oraesia intrusa (Krüger, 1939)
- Ozarba adducta Berio, 1940
- Ozarba atrifera Hampson, 1910
- Ozarba mesozonata Hampson, 1916
- Ozarba nyanza (Felder & Rogenhofer, 1874)
- Ozarba phlebitis Hampson, 1910
- Ozarba socotrana Hampson, 1910
- Pandesma robusta (Walker, 1858)
- Pericyma mendax (Walker, 1858)
- Pericyma metaleuca Hampson, 1913
- Polydesma umbricola Boisduval, 1833
- Polytela cliens (Felder & Rogenhofer, 1874)
- Prionofrontia ochrosia Hampson, 1926
- Pseudozarba mesozona (Hampson, 1896)
- Rhynchina albiscripta Hampson, 1916
- Rhynchina coniodes Vári, 1962
- Rhynchodontodes larseni Wiltshire, 1983
- Sideridis chersotoides Wiltshire, 1956
- Sphingomorpha chlorea (Cramer, 1777)
- Spodoptera cilium Guenée, 1852
- Spodoptera exigua (Hübner, 1808)
- Spodoptera littoralis (Boisduval, 1833)
- Spodoptera mauritia (Boisduval, 1833)
- Stenosticta grisea Hampson, 1912
- Stenosticta sibensis Wiltshire, 1977
- Tathorhynchus exsiccata (Lederer, 1855)
- Thiacidas postica Walker, 1855
- Thysanoplusia exquisita (Felder & Rogenhofer, 1874)
- Trichoplusia ni (Hübner, [1803])
- Trichoplusia orichalcea (Fabricius, 1775)
- Tytroca balnearia (Distant, 1898)
- Ulotrichopus stertzi (Püngeler, 1907)
- Ulotrichopus tinctipennis (Hampson, 1902)
- Vittaplusia vittata (Wallengren, 1856)
- Zethesides bettoni (Butler, 1898)

== Nolidae ==
- Bryophilopsis tarachoides Mabille, 1900
- Churia gallagheri Wiltshire, 1985
- Earias insulana (Boisduval, 1833)
- Giaura dakkaki Wiltshire, 1986
- Neaxestis aviuncis Wiltshire, 1985
- Xanthodes albago (Fabricius, 1794)

== Pterophoridae ==
- Agdistis arabica Amsel, 1958
- Agdistis nanodes Meyrick, 1906
- Agdistis olei Arenberger, 1976
- Agdistis omani Arenberger, 2008
- Arcoptilia gizan Arenberger, 1985
- Deuterocopus socotranus Rebel, 1907
- Diacrotricha lanceatus (Arenberger, 1986)
- Megalorhipida leptomeres (Meyrick, 1886)
- Megalorhipida leucodactylus (Fabricius, 1794)
- Pterophorus ischnodactyla (Treitschke, 1833)

== Tischeriidae ==
- Tischeria omani Puplesis & Diškus, 2003

== Tortricidae ==
- Age onychistica Diakonoff, 1982
- Ancylis sederana Chrétien, 1915
- Bactra venosana (Zeller, 1847)
- Dasodis cladographa Diakonoff, 1983
- Fulcrifera refrigescens (Meyrick, 1924)

== Xyloryctidae ==
- Eretmocera impactella (Walker, 1864)
- Scythris alhamrae Bengtsson, 2002
- Scythris amplexella Bengtsson, 2002
- Scythris cucullella Bengtsson, 2002
- Scythris elachistoides Bengtsson, 2002
- Scythris fissurella Bengtsson, 1997
- Scythris kebirella Amsel, 1935
- Scythris nipholecta Meyrick, 1924
- Scythris pangalactis Meyrick, 1933
- Scythris pollicella Bengtsson, 2002
- Scythris valgella Bengtsson, 2002
