= Siccia tridens =

Scientific classification
- Kingdom: Animalia
- Phylum: Arthropoda
- Clade: Pancrustacea
- Class: Insecta
- Order: Lepidoptera
- Superfamily: Noctuoidea
- Family: Erebidae
- Subfamily: Arctiinae
- Genus: Siccia
- Species: S. tridens

Binomial name
- Siccia tridens Volynkin, 2023

Species of moth

Siccia tridens is a species of moth in the family Erebidae. It was described by Anton Volynkin in 2023. This species can be found in West Africa (Ivory Coast, Togo, Nigeria) and in Cameroon.

The forewing length is 6–7 mm (0.24–0.28 in) in males and 6–6.5 mm (0.24–0.26 in) in females.
