= Scopula alfierii =

Scientific classification
- Kingdom: Animalia
- Phylum: Arthropoda
- Class: Insecta
- Order: Lepidoptera
- Family: Geometridae
- Genus: Scopula
- Species: S. alfierii

Binomial name
- Scopula alfierii (Wiltshire, 1949)

Synonyms
- Glossotrophia alfierii Wiltshire, 1949; Glossotrophia buraimana Wiltshire, 1949; Scopula buraimana

Species of geometer moth in subfamily Sterrhinae

Scopula alfierii is a moth of the family Geometridae. It is found in Egypt and Oman.

== Subspecies ==
- Scopula alfierii alfierii (Egypt)
- Scopula alfierii montana (Wiltshire, 1980) (Oman)
