= Scopula adenensis =

Scientific classification
- Kingdom: Animalia
- Phylum: Arthropoda
- Class: Insecta
- Order: Lepidoptera
- Family: Geometridae
- Genus: Scopula
- Species: S. adenensis

Binomial name
- Scopula adenensis (Wiltshire, 1986)

Synonyms
- Glossotrophia adenensis Wiltshire, 1986

Species of geometer moths in subfamily Sterrhinae

Scopula adenensis is a moth of the family Geometridae. It is found in Yemen, Saudi Arabia and Oman.
