= Eupithecia tricerata =

Scientific classification
- Kingdom: Animalia
- Phylum: Arthropoda
- Class: Insecta
- Order: Lepidoptera
- Family: Geometridae
- Genus: Eupithecia
- Species: E. tricerata

Binomial name
- Eupithecia tricerata Wiltshire, 1990

Species of moth

Eupithecia tricerata is a moth in the family Geometridae. It is found in Israel, Jordan and Saudi Arabia.

In the genus Eupithecia, species are often nearly identical externally, so "real" information for specialists focuses on the octavals.

== Subspecies ==
- Eupithecia tricerata tricerata
- Eupithecia tricerata sperlichi Hausmann, 1991 (Jordan)
