= Scopula froitzheimi =

Scientific classification
- Kingdom: Animalia
- Phylum: Arthropoda
- Class: Insecta
- Order: Lepidoptera
- Family: Geometridae
- Genus: Scopula
- Species: S. froitzheimi

Binomial name
- Scopula froitzheimi Wiltshire, 1967

Species of geometer moth in subfamily Sterrhinae

Scopula froitzheimi is a moth of the family Geometridae. It is endemic to Afghanistan.
