= S. arabica =

S. arabica may refer to:

- Siccia arabica, a moth species found in Saudi Arabia
- Sillago arabica, the shortnose whiting, an inshore marine fish species that inhabits only the Persian Gulf

== See also ==
- Arabica (disambiguation)
