= Eupithecia subregulosa =

Scientific classification
- Kingdom: Animalia
- Phylum: Arthropoda
- Class: Insecta
- Order: Lepidoptera
- Family: Geometridae
- Genus: Eupithecia
- Species: E. subregulosa

Binomial name
- Eupithecia subregulosa Wiltshire, 1990

Species of moth

Eupithecia subregulosa is a moth in the family Geometridae. It is found in Saudi Arabia.
