= Scopula uvarovi =

Scientific classification
- Kingdom: Animalia
- Phylum: Arthropoda
- Class: Insecta
- Order: Lepidoptera
- Family: Geometridae
- Genus: Scopula
- Species: S. uvarovi

Binomial name
- Scopula uvarovi (Wiltshire, 1952)

Synonyms
- Glossotrophia uvarovi Wiltshire, 1952

Species of geometer moth in subfamily Sterrhinae

Scopula uvarovi is a moth of the family Geometridae. It is found in Oman.
