= Eupithecia jizlensis =

Scientific classification
- Kingdom: Animalia
- Phylum: Arthropoda
- Class: Insecta
- Order: Lepidoptera
- Family: Geometridae
- Genus: Eupithecia
- Species: E. jizlensis

Binomial name
- Eupithecia jizlensis Wiltshire, 1986

Species of moth

Eupithecia jizlensis is a moth in the family Geometridae. It is found in Saudi Arabia.

== Subspecies ==
- Eupithecia jizlensis jizlensis
- Eupithecia jizlensis muelleri Hausmann, 1991
