= Scopula omana =

Scientific classification
- Kingdom: Animalia
- Phylum: Arthropoda
- Class: Insecta
- Order: Lepidoptera
- Family: Geometridae
- Genus: Scopula
- Species: S. omana

Binomial name
- Scopula omana Wiltshire, 1977

Species of geometer moth in subfamily Sterrhinae

Scopula omana is a moth of the family Geometridae. It is found in the United Arab Emirates.
