= Scopula risa =

Scientific classification
- Kingdom: Animalia
- Phylum: Arthropoda
- Class: Insecta
- Order: Lepidoptera
- Family: Geometridae
- Genus: Scopula
- Species: S. risa

Binomial name
- Scopula risa Wiltshire, 1982

Species of geometer moth in subfamily Sterrhinae

Scopula risa is a moth of the family Geometridae. It is found in Saudi Arabia.
