= Scopula terminata =

Scientific classification
- Kingdom: Animalia
- Phylum: Arthropoda
- Clade: Pancrustacea
- Class: Insecta
- Order: Lepidoptera
- Family: Geometridae
- Genus: Scopula
- Species: S. terminata

Binomial name
- Scopula terminata (Wiltshire, 1966)

Synonyms
- Glossotrophia terminata Wiltshire, 1966

Species of geometer moth in subfamily Sterrhinae

Scopula terminata is a moth of the family Geometridae. It is found in Afghanistan, Pakistan and China.

== Subspecies ==
- Scopula terminata terminata
- Scopula terminata machadoi (Hausmann, 1993)
