= Eupithecia wittmeri =

Scientific classification
- Kingdom: Animalia
- Phylum: Arthropoda
- Class: Insecta
- Order: Lepidoptera
- Family: Geometridae
- Genus: Eupithecia
- Species: E. wittmeri

Binomial name
- Eupithecia wittmeri Wiltshire, 1980

Species of moth

Eupithecia wittmeri is a moth in the family Geometridae. It is found in Saudi Arabia.
