= Siccia buettikeri =

Scientific classification
- Kingdom: Animalia
- Phylum: Arthropoda
- Class: Insecta
- Order: Lepidoptera
- Superfamily: Noctuoidea
- Family: Erebidae
- Subfamily: Arctiinae
- Genus: Siccia
- Species: S. buettikeri

Binomial name
- Siccia buettikeri Wiltshire, 1988

Species of moth

Siccia buettikeri is a moth in the family Erebidae. It was described by Wiltshire in 1988. It is found in Saudi Arabia.
