= Scopula subgastonaria =

Scientific classification
- Kingdom: Animalia
- Phylum: Arthropoda
- Class: Insecta
- Order: Lepidoptera
- Family: Geometridae
- Genus: Scopula
- Species: S. subgastonaria

Binomial name
- Scopula subgastonaria Wiltshire, 1982

Species of geometer moth in subfamily Sterrhinae

Scopula subgastonaria is a species of moth that belongs to the family Geometridae (geometry moths). It is found in Saudi Arabia.
