= Scopula dhofarata =

Scientific classification
- Kingdom: Animalia
- Phylum: Arthropoda
- Class: Insecta
- Order: Lepidoptera
- Family: Geometridae
- Genus: Scopula
- Species: S. dhofarata

Binomial name
- Scopula dhofarata Wiltshire, 1986

Species of geometer moth in subfamily Sterrhinae

Scopula dhofarata is a moth of the family Geometridae. It is found in Oman and Saudi Arabia.
