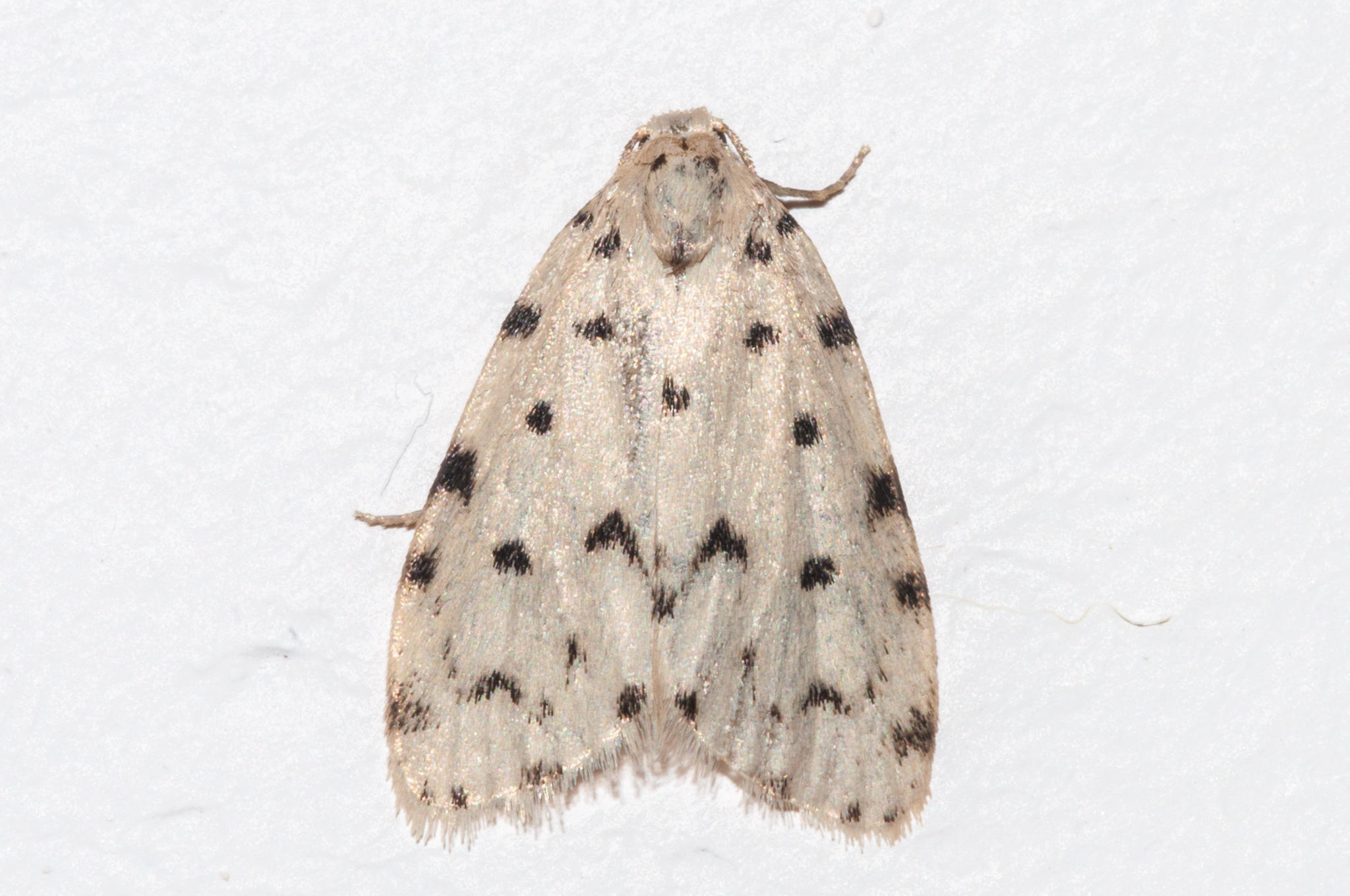

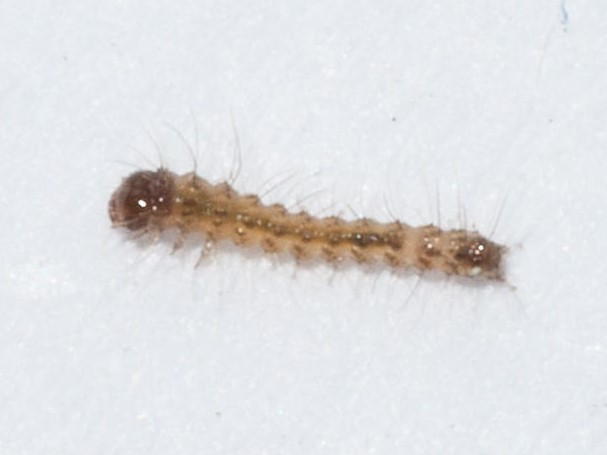
- Adult (top) and larva (bottom)

Scientific classification
- Kingdom: Animalia
- Phylum: Arthropoda
- Class: Insecta
- Order: Lepidoptera
- Superfamily: Noctuoidea
- Family: Erebidae
- Subfamily: Arctiinae
- Genus: Siccia
- Species: S. caffra

Binomial name
- Siccia caffra Walker, 1854

Synonyms
- Lithosia nigropunctata Wallengren, 1860; Melania punctigera Felder, 1874

= Siccia caffra =

Species of moth

Siccia caffra is a moth in the family Erebidae. It was described by Francis Walker in 1854. It is found in South Africa.
