= Siccia duodecimpunctata =

Scientific classification
- Kingdom: Animalia
- Phylum: Arthropoda
- Clade: Pancrustacea
- Class: Insecta
- Order: Lepidoptera
- Superfamily: Noctuoidea
- Family: Erebidae
- Subfamily: Arctiinae
- Genus: Siccia
- Species: S. duodecimpunctata

Binomial name
- Siccia duodecimpunctata Kiriakoff, 1958

Species of moth

Siccia duodecimpunctata is a moth in the family Erebidae. It was described by Sergius G. Kiriakoff in 1958. It is found in Kenya and Uganda.
