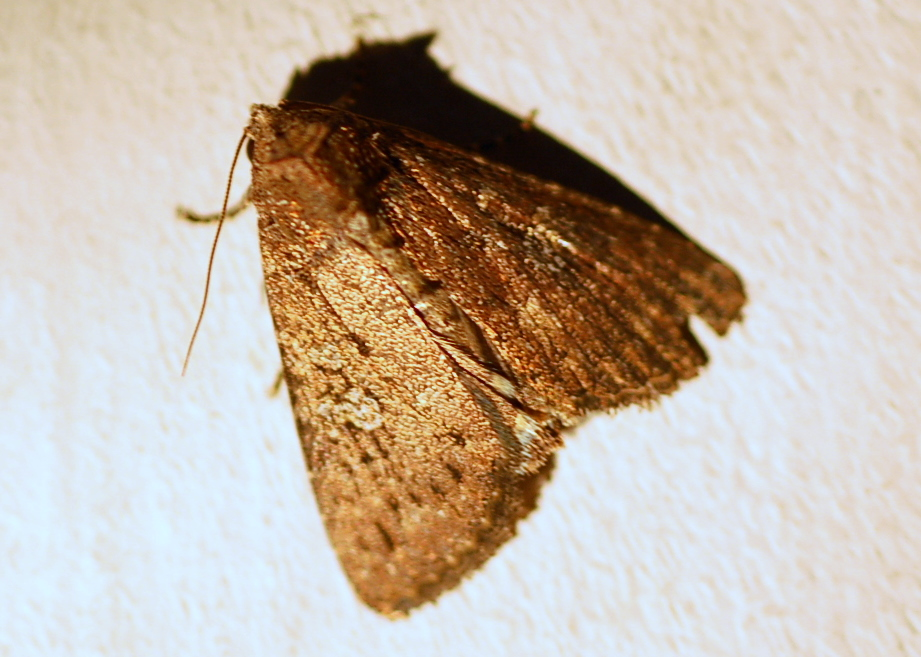

Scientific classification
- Kingdom: Animalia
- Phylum: Arthropoda
- Class: Insecta
- Order: Lepidoptera
- Superfamily: Noctuoidea
- Family: Noctuidae
- Genus: Condica
- Species: C. conducta

Binomial name
- Condica conducta (Walker, [1857])

Synonyms
- Caradrina conducta Walker, [1857]; Platysenta conducta; Perigea conducta

= Condica conducta =

Species of moth

Condica conducta is a moth of the family Noctuidae described by Francis Walker in 1857. It has a wide range and occurs in Africa (including South Africa, Congo, Madagascar and Réunion) as well as in Hong Kong, Fiji, the Society Islands and the Chagos Archipelago.

Larvae have been recorded on Senecio species.
