= Siccia quilimania =

Scientific classification
- Domain: Eukaryota
- Kingdom: Animalia
- Phylum: Arthropoda
- Class: Insecta
- Order: Lepidoptera
- Superfamily: Noctuoidea
- Family: Erebidae
- Subfamily: Arctiinae
- Genus: Siccia
- Species: S. quilimania

Binomial name
- Siccia quilimania Strand, 1922

Species of moth

Siccia quilimania is a moth in the family Erebidae. It was described by Strand in 1922. It is found in Mozambique.
