= Siccia punctipennis =

Scientific classification
- Kingdom: Animalia
- Phylum: Arthropoda
- Class: Insecta
- Order: Lepidoptera
- Superfamily: Noctuoidea
- Family: Erebidae
- Subfamily: Arctiinae
- Genus: Siccia
- Species: S. punctipennis

Binomial name
- Siccia punctipennis (Wallengren, 1863)

Synonyms
- Lithosia punctipennis Wallengren, 1863

Species of moth

Siccia punctipennis is a moth in the family Erebidae. It was described by Wallengren in 1863. It is found on the Comoros, Madagascar and the Seychelles and in South Africa.
