= Hypotacha fractura =

Scientific classification
- Kingdom: Animalia
- Phylum: Arthropoda
- Class: Insecta
- Order: Lepidoptera
- Superfamily: Noctuoidea
- Family: Erebidae
- Genus: Hypotacha
- Species: H. fractura

Binomial name
- Hypotacha fractura Kühne, 2005

Species of moth

Hypotacha fractura is a species of moth in the family Erebidae. It is found in India.
