= Siccia obscura =

Scientific classification
- Domain: Eukaryota
- Kingdom: Animalia
- Phylum: Arthropoda
- Class: Insecta
- Order: Lepidoptera
- Superfamily: Noctuoidea
- Family: Erebidae
- Subfamily: Arctiinae
- Genus: Siccia
- Species: S. obscura

Binomial name
- Siccia obscura (Leech, 1888)

Synonyms
- Eugoa obscura Leech, 1888

Species of moth

Siccia obscura is a moth of the subfamily Arctiinae first described by John Henry Leech in 1888. It is found in Japan.
