= Hypotacha legrandi =

Scientific classification
- Kingdom: Animalia
- Phylum: Arthropoda
- Class: Insecta
- Order: Lepidoptera
- Superfamily: Noctuoidea
- Family: Erebidae
- Genus: Hypotacha
- Species: H. legrandi

Binomial name
- Hypotacha legrandi (Berio, 1959)

Synonyms
- Audea legrandi Berio, 1959

Species of moth

Hypotacha legrandi is a species of moth in the family Erebidae. It is found in Eritrea, Ethiopia, Kenya, Tanzania and Yemen.
