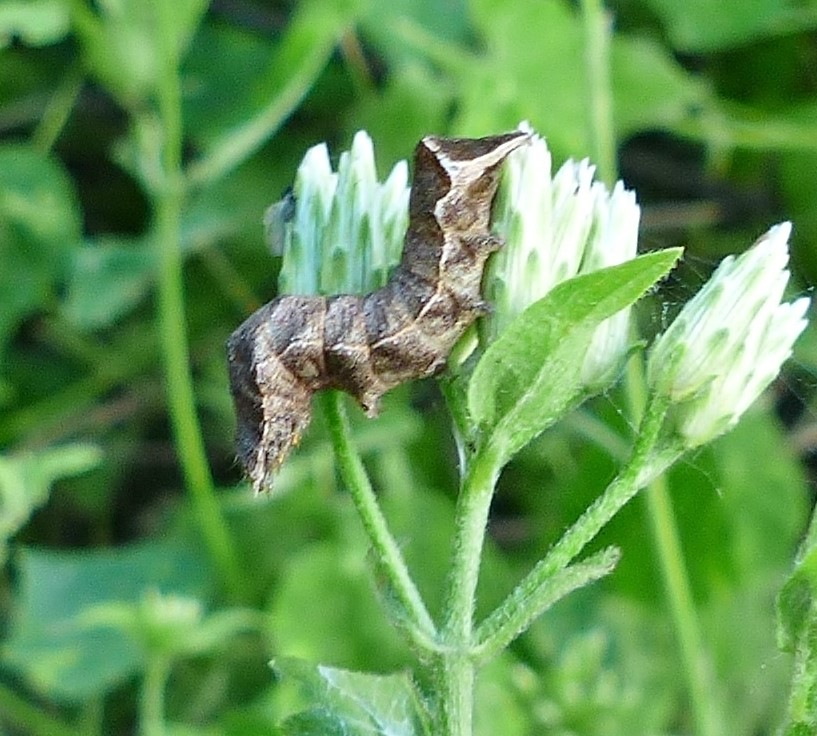
- Condica albigera caterpillar

Scientific classification
- Kingdom: Animalia
- Phylum: Arthropoda
- Clade: Pancrustacea
- Class: Insecta
- Order: Lepidoptera
- Superfamily: Noctuoidea
- Family: Noctuidae
- Genus: Condica
- Species: C. albigera

Binomial name
- Condica albigera (Guenée, 1852)

= Condica albigera =

Species of moth

Condica albigera, commonly known as the boneset groundling, is a species of moth in the owlet moth family Noctuidae. It is found in North America.
