= Hypotacha glaucata =

Scientific classification
- Kingdom: Animalia
- Phylum: Arthropoda
- Class: Insecta
- Order: Lepidoptera
- Superfamily: Noctuoidea
- Family: Erebidae
- Genus: Hypotacha
- Species: H. glaucata

Binomial name
- Hypotacha glaucata (Holland, 1897)

Synonyms
- Eublemma glaucata Holland, 1897; Crypsotidia glaucata

Species of moth

Hypotacha glaucata is a species of moth in the family Erebidae. It is found in Ethiopia and Kenya.
