= Hypotacha brandbergensis =

Scientific classification
- Kingdom: Animalia
- Phylum: Arthropoda
- Class: Insecta
- Order: Lepidoptera
- Superfamily: Noctuoidea
- Family: Erebidae
- Genus: Hypotacha
- Species: H. brandbergensis

Binomial name
- Hypotacha brandbergensis Kühne, 2004

Species of moth

Hypotacha brandbergensis is a species of moth in the family Erebidae. It is found in Namibia.
