= Hypotacha antrummagna =

Scientific classification
- Kingdom: Animalia
- Phylum: Arthropoda
- Class: Insecta
- Order: Lepidoptera
- Superfamily: Noctuoidea
- Family: Erebidae
- Genus: Hypotacha
- Species: H. antrummagna

Binomial name
- Hypotacha antrummagna Kühne, 2005

Species of moth

Hypotacha antrummagna is a species of moth in the family Erebidae. It is found in Ghana and Tanzania.
