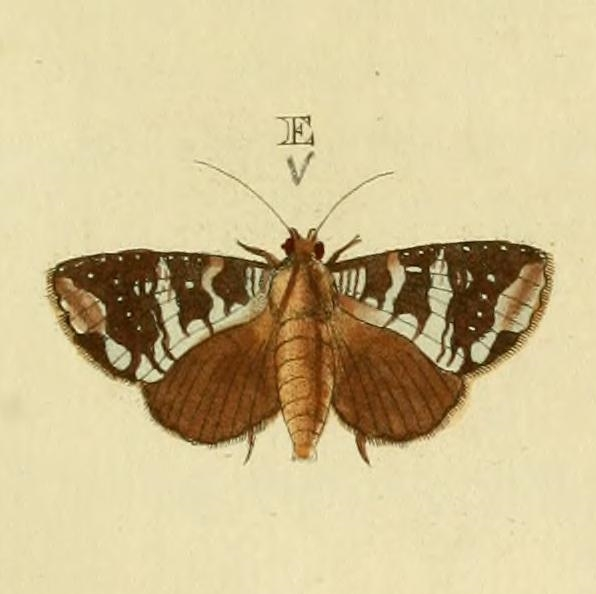

Scientific classification
- Domain: Eukaryota
- Kingdom: Animalia
- Phylum: Arthropoda
- Class: Insecta
- Order: Lepidoptera
- Superfamily: Noctuoidea
- Family: Noctuidae
- Genus: Condica
- Species: C. cupentia

Binomial name
- Condica cupentia (Cramer, 1779)

= Condica cupentia =

Species of moth

Condica cupentia, the splotched groundling, is a species of moth in the family Noctuidae (the owlet moths). It is found in North America.

The MONA or Hodges number for Condica cupentia is 9713.
