= Siccia nilgirica =

Scientific classification
- Kingdom: Animalia
- Phylum: Arthropoda
- Clade: Pancrustacea
- Class: Insecta
- Order: Lepidoptera
- Superfamily: Noctuoidea
- Family: Erebidae
- Subfamily: Arctiinae
- Genus: Siccia
- Species: S. nilgirica

Binomial name
- Siccia nilgirica Hampson, 1891

Synonyms
- Aemene nilgirica Hampson, 1891; Aemene nilgirica Singh, Singh & Joshi, 2014

Species of moth

Siccia nilgirica is a moth of the family Erebidae first described by George Hampson in 1891. It is found in India, China, Sri Lanka, and Java.
