= Siccia atriguttata =

Scientific classification
- Kingdom: Animalia
- Phylum: Arthropoda
- Class: Insecta
- Order: Lepidoptera
- Superfamily: Noctuoidea
- Family: Erebidae
- Subfamily: Arctiinae
- Genus: Siccia
- Species: S. atriguttata

Binomial name
- Siccia atriguttata Hampson, 1909

Species of moth

Siccia atriguttata is a moth in the family Erebidae. It was described by George Hampson in 1909. It is found in Angola and South Africa.
