= Siccia cretata =

Scientific classification
- Kingdom: Animalia
- Phylum: Arthropoda
- Clade: Pancrustacea
- Class: Insecta
- Order: Lepidoptera
- Superfamily: Noctuoidea
- Family: Erebidae
- Subfamily: Arctiinae
- Genus: Siccia
- Species: S. cretata

Binomial name
- Siccia cretata Hampson, 1914

Species of moth

Siccia cretata is a moth in the family Erebidae. It was described by George Hampson in 1914. It is found in Ghana, Kenya, Sierra Leone and Uganda.

The larvae have been recorded feeding on lichens.
