= Siccia bicolorata =

Scientific classification
- Kingdom: Animalia
- Phylum: Arthropoda
- Class: Insecta
- Order: Lepidoptera
- Superfamily: Noctuoidea
- Family: Erebidae
- Subfamily: Arctiinae
- Genus: Siccia
- Species: S. bicolorata

Binomial name
- Siccia bicolorata Romieux, 1937

Species of moth

Siccia bicolorata is a moth in the family Erebidae. It was described by Romieux in 1937. It is found in the Democratic Republic of Congo.
