= Condica temecula =

Scientific classification
- Domain: Eukaryota
- Kingdom: Animalia
- Phylum: Arthropoda
- Class: Insecta
- Order: Lepidoptera
- Superfamily: Noctuoidea
- Family: Noctuidae
- Genus: Condica
- Species: C. temecula

Binomial name
- Condica temecula (Barnes, 1905)

Species of moth

Condica temecula is a species of moth in the family Noctuidae (the owlet moths). It was first described by William Barnes in 1905 and it is found in North America.

The MONA or Hodges number for Condica temecula is 9691.
