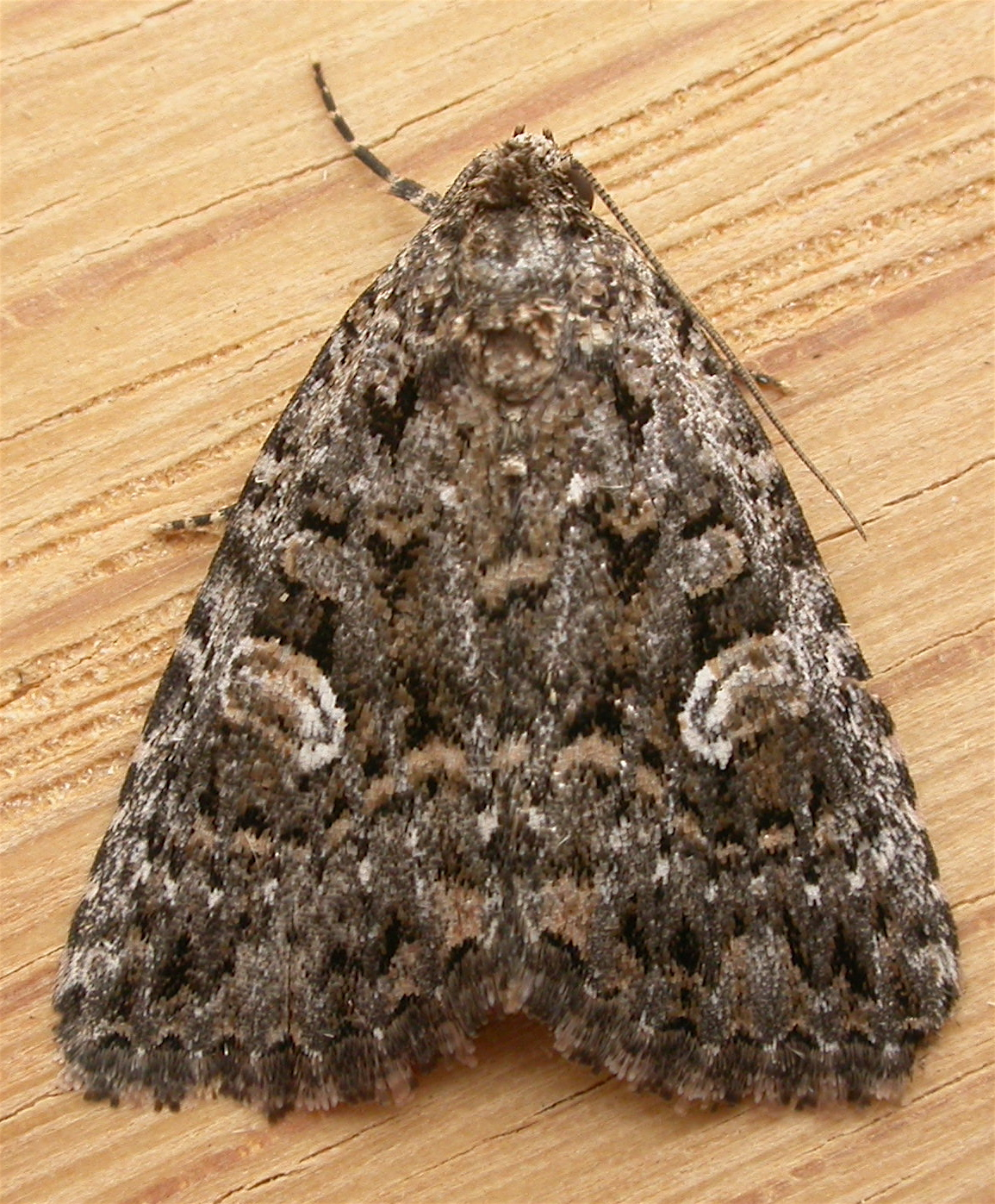

Scientific classification
- Kingdom: Animalia
- Phylum: Arthropoda
- Class: Insecta
- Order: Lepidoptera
- Superfamily: Noctuoidea
- Family: Noctuidae
- Genus: Condica
- Species: C. aroana

Binomial name
- Condica aroana Bethune-Baker (1906)

Synonyms
- Prospalta ochreata (Warren, 1937); Condica minuscula (Berio, 1977)

= Condica aroana =

Species of moth

Condica aroana is a moth in the family Noctuidae that occurs in Australia and Borneo.

== Description ==
There is a kidney shaped mark in the center of each forewing, the hindwings are brown with darker brown veins. They have buff speckled dark brown wings that are 20mm in length.
