= Condica morsa =

Scientific classification
- Domain: Eukaryota
- Kingdom: Animalia
- Phylum: Arthropoda
- Class: Insecta
- Order: Lepidoptera
- Superfamily: Noctuoidea
- Family: Noctuidae
- Tribe: Condicini
- Genus: Condica
- Species: C. morsa

Binomial name
- Condica morsa (Smith, 1907)

Species of moth

Condica morsa is a species of moth in the family Noctuidae (the owlet moths).

The MONA or Hodges number for Condica morsa is 9712.
