= Condica parista =

Scientific classification
- Domain: Eukaryota
- Kingdom: Animalia
- Phylum: Arthropoda
- Class: Insecta
- Order: Lepidoptera
- Superfamily: Noctuoidea
- Family: Noctuidae
- Genus: Condica
- Species: C. parista

Binomial name
- Condica parista (Schaus, 1921)

Species of moth

Condica parista is a species of moth in the family Noctuidae (the owlet moths).

The MONA or Hodges number for Condica parista is 9702.2.
