= Hypotacha isthmigera =

Scientific classification
- Kingdom: Animalia
- Phylum: Arthropoda
- Clade: Pancrustacea
- Class: Insecta
- Order: Lepidoptera
- Superfamily: Noctuoidea
- Family: Erebidae
- Genus: Hypotacha
- Species: H. isthmigera

Binomial name
- Hypotacha isthmigera Wiltshire, 1968

Synonyms
- Hypotacha isthmigera ab. striata Wiltshire, 1968; Hypotacha isthmigera ab. divisa Wiltshire, 1968; Hypotacha isthmigera ab. brunnea Wiltshire, 1968

Species of moth

Hypotacha isthmigera is a species of moth in the family Erebidae. It is found in Angola, Ethiopia, Kenya, Mali, Namibia, Nigeria, Oman, Senegal, South Africa, Sudan, Tanzania and Yemen.

The larvae have been recorded feeding on Acacia tortilis and Acacia senegal.
