= Hypotacha fiorii =

Scientific classification
- Kingdom: Animalia
- Phylum: Arthropoda
- Clade: Pancrustacea
- Class: Insecta
- Order: Lepidoptera
- Superfamily: Noctuoidea
- Family: Erebidae
- Genus: Hypotacha
- Species: H. fiorii

Binomial name
- Hypotacha fiorii Berio, 1943

Species of moth

Hypotacha fiorii is a species of moth in the family Erebidae. It is found in Eritrea, Ethiopia, and Niger.
