= Hypotacha soudanensis =

Scientific classification
- Kingdom: Animalia
- Phylum: Arthropoda
- Clade: Pancrustacea
- Class: Insecta
- Order: Lepidoptera
- Superfamily: Noctuoidea
- Family: Erebidae
- Genus: Hypotacha
- Species: H. soudanensis

Binomial name
- Hypotacha soudanensis Kühne, 2005

Species of moth

Hypotacha soudanensis is a species of moth in the family Erebidae. It is found in Mali and Yemen.
