= Siccia arabica =

Scientific classification
- Kingdom: Animalia
- Phylum: Arthropoda
- Class: Insecta
- Order: Lepidoptera
- Superfamily: Noctuoidea
- Family: Erebidae
- Subfamily: Arctiinae
- Genus: Siccia
- Species: S. arabica

Binomial name
- Siccia arabica Wiltshire, 1983

Species of moth

Siccia arabica is a moth in the family Erebidae. It was described by Wiltshire in 1983. It is found in Saudi Arabia.
