= Siccia minima =

Scientific classification
- Kingdom: Animalia
- Phylum: Arthropoda
- Clade: Pancrustacea
- Class: Insecta
- Order: Lepidoptera
- Superfamily: Noctuoidea
- Family: Erebidae
- Subfamily: Arctiinae
- Genus: Siccia
- Species: S. minima

Binomial name
- Siccia minima Hampson, 1900

Synonyms
- Neosiccia minima van Eecke, 1927; Siccia minima Singh, Singh & Joshi, 2014

Species of moth

Siccia minima is a moth of the family Erebidae first described by George Hampson in 1900. It is found in Sri Lanka.
