= Nimasia =

Scientific classification
- Kingdom: Animalia
- Phylum: Arthropoda
- Class: Insecta
- Order: Lepidoptera
- Superfamily: Noctuoidea
- Family: Erebidae
- Subfamily: Calpinae
- Genus: Nimasia; Wiltshire, 1982
- Species: N. brachyura

Binomial name
- Nimasia brachyura Wiltshire, 1982

Genus of moths

Nimasia is a monotypic moth genus of the family Erebidae. Its only species, Nimasia brachyura, is found in Saudi Arabia, Yemen and Oman. Both the genus and species were first described by Wiltshire in 1982.
