= Condica discistriga =

Scientific classification
- Domain: Eukaryota
- Kingdom: Animalia
- Phylum: Arthropoda
- Class: Insecta
- Order: Lepidoptera
- Superfamily: Noctuoidea
- Family: Noctuidae
- Tribe: Condicini
- Genus: Condica
- Species: C. discistriga

Binomial name
- Condica discistriga (Smith, 1894)

Species of moth

Condica discistriga is a species of moth in the family Noctuidae (the owlet moths). It is found in North America.

The MONA or Hodges number for Condica discistriga is 9692.
