= Siccia pallens =

Scientific classification
- Kingdom: Animalia
- Phylum: Arthropoda
- Class: Insecta
- Order: Lepidoptera
- Superfamily: Noctuoidea
- Family: Erebidae
- Subfamily: Arctiinae
- Genus: Siccia
- Species: S. pallens

Binomial name
- Siccia pallens Hampson, 1918

Species of moth

Siccia pallens is a moth in the family Erebidae first described by George Hampson in 1918. It is found in Uganda.
