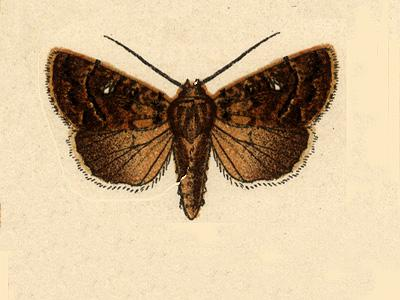

Scientific classification
- Kingdom: Animalia
- Phylum: Arthropoda
- Class: Insecta
- Order: Lepidoptera
- Superfamily: Noctuoidea
- Family: Noctuidae
- Genus: Condica
- Species: C. punctifera

Binomial name
- Condica punctifera (Walker, [1857])

Synonyms
- Celaena punctifera Walker, [1857]; Perigea punctifera; Perigea plumbago Herrich-Schäffer, 1868; Condica plumbago; Celaena semifurca Walker, 1857

= Condica punctifera =

Species of moth

Condica punctifera is a moth of the family Noctuidae first described by Francis Walker in 1857. It is found in southern Florida and on the Bahamas, Cuba, Jamaica, Hispaniola and Puerto Rico.

The wingspan is 27 millimetres (1.1 in).
