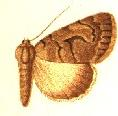

Scientific classification
- Kingdom: Animalia
- Phylum: Arthropoda
- Class: Insecta
- Order: Lepidoptera
- Superfamily: Noctuoidea
- Family: Erebidae
- Genus: Hypotacha
- Species: H. nigristria

Binomial name
- Hypotacha nigristria (Hampson, 1902)

Synonyms
- Audea nigristria Hampson, 1902

= Hypotacha nigristria =

Species of moth

Hypotacha nigristria is a species of moth in the family Erebidae. It is found in South Africa.
