= Siccia paucipuncta =

Scientific classification
- Kingdom: Animalia
- Phylum: Arthropoda
- Class: Insecta
- Order: Lepidoptera
- Superfamily: Noctuoidea
- Family: Erebidae
- Subfamily: Arctiinae
- Genus: Siccia
- Species: S. paucipuncta

Binomial name
- Siccia paucipuncta Hampson, 1918

Species of moth

Siccia paucipuncta is a moth in the family Erebidae. It was described by George Hampson in 1918. It is found in Sierra Leone.
