= Siccia eberti =

Scientific classification
- Kingdom: Animalia
- Phylum: Arthropoda
- Clade: Pancrustacea
- Class: Insecta
- Order: Lepidoptera
- Superfamily: Noctuoidea
- Family: Erebidae
- Subfamily: Arctiinae
- Genus: Siccia
- Species: S. eberti

Binomial name
- Siccia eberti Kühne, 2007

Species of moth

Siccia eberti is a moth in the family Erebidae. It was described by Lars Kühne in 2007. It is found in Zimbabwe.
