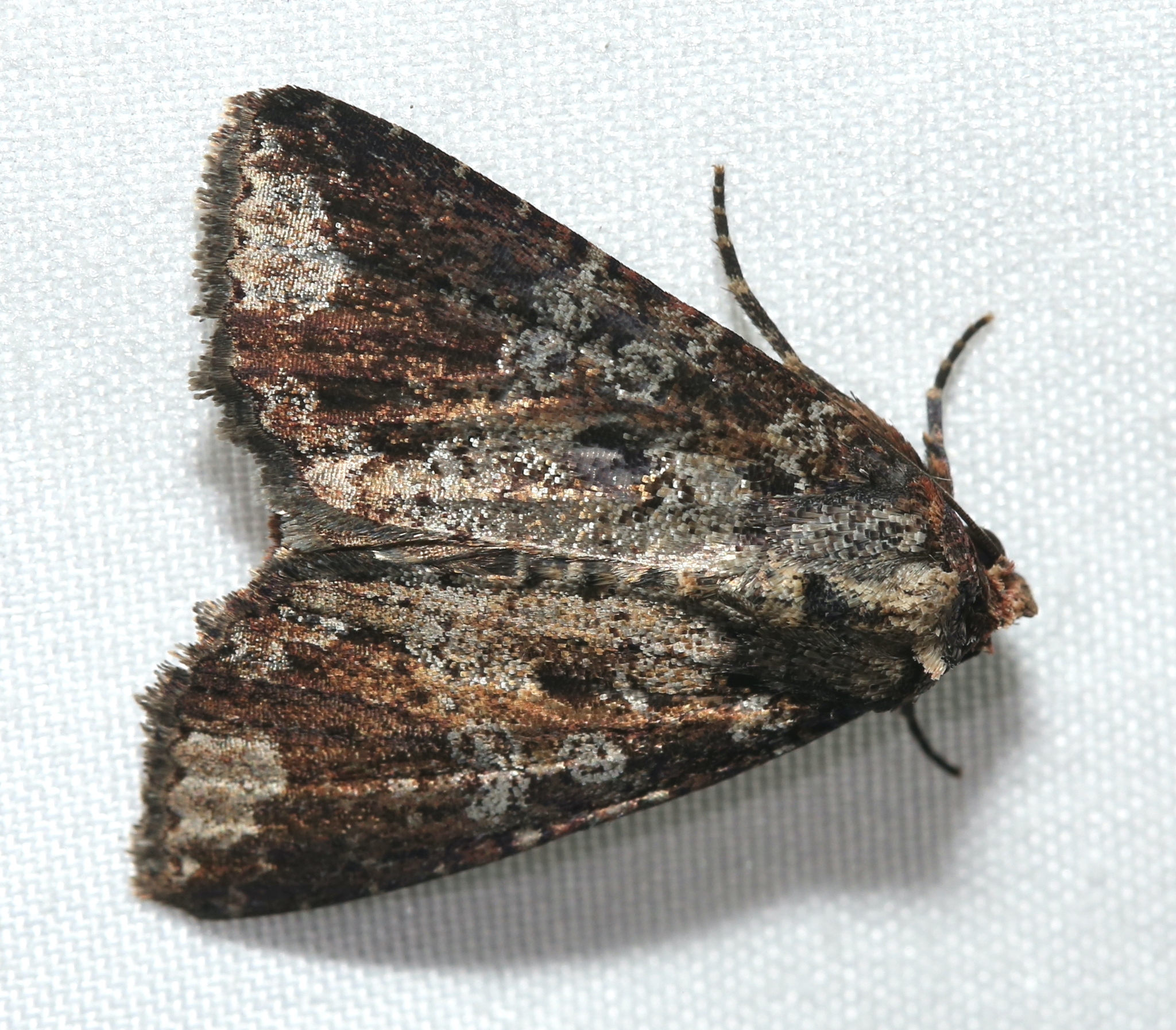
- Adult
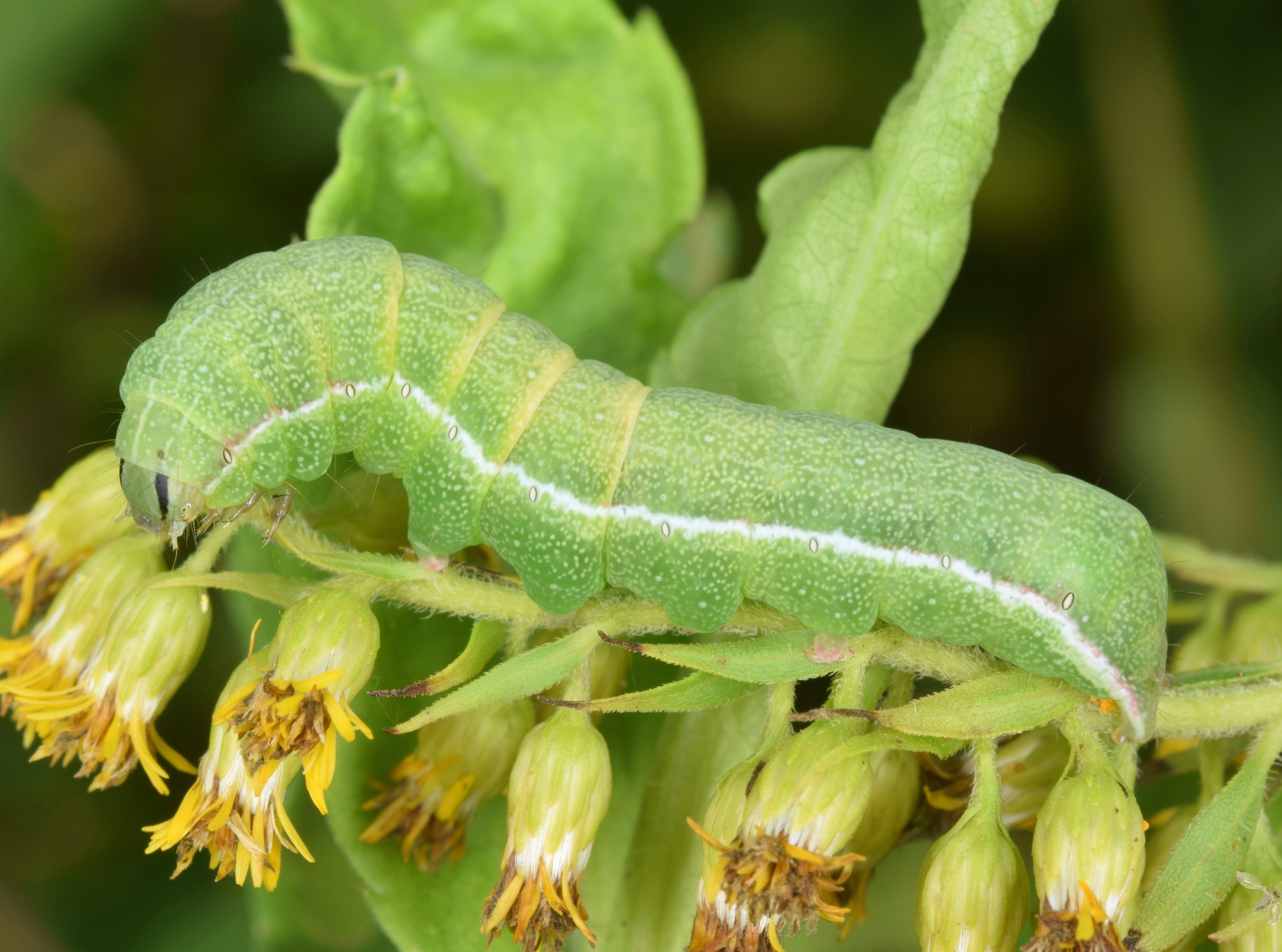
- Larva

Scientific classification
- Kingdom: Animalia
- Phylum: Arthropoda
- Class: Insecta
- Order: Lepidoptera
- Superfamily: Noctuoidea
- Family: Noctuidae
- Genus: Condica
- Species: C. confederata

Binomial name
- Condica confederata (Grote, 1873)

= Condica confederata =

Species of moth

Condica confederata, or the confederate, is a species of moth in the family Noctuidae (the owlet moths). It is found in North America.

The MONA or Hodges number for Condica confederata is 9714.
