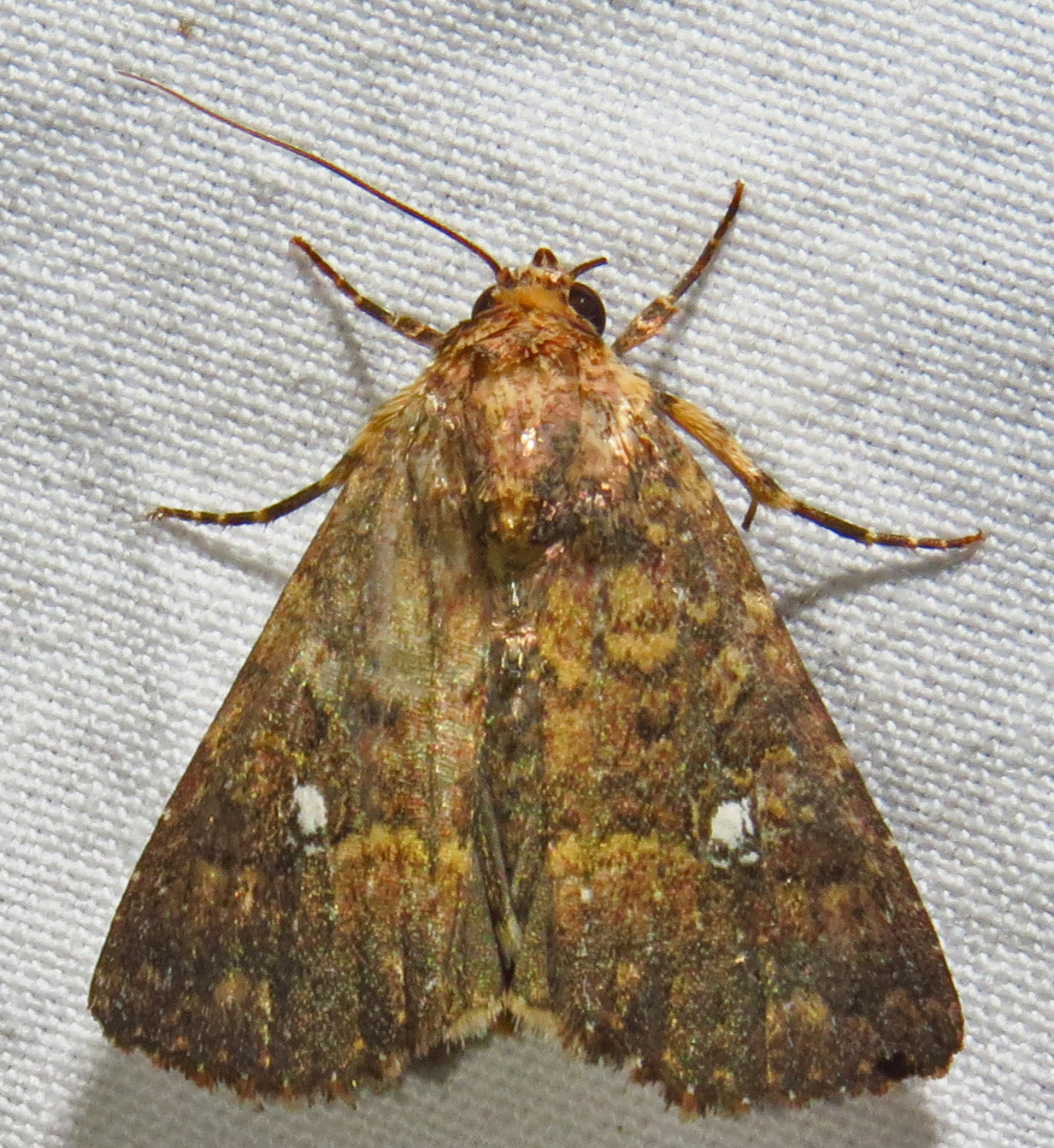

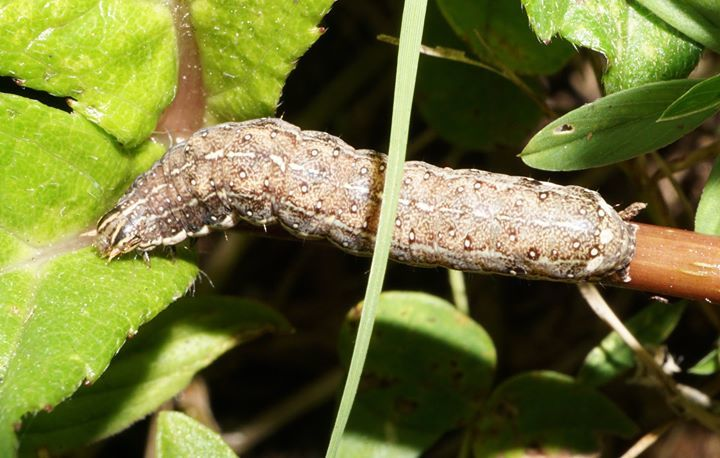
- Adult (top), and larva (lower)

Scientific classification
- Kingdom: Animalia
- Phylum: Arthropoda
- Class: Insecta
- Order: Lepidoptera
- Superfamily: Noctuoidea
- Family: Noctuidae
- Genus: Condica
- Species: C. mobilis

Binomial name
- Condica mobilis (Walker, 1857)

= Condica mobilis =

Species of moth

Condica mobilis, the Mobile groundling, is a species of moth in the family Noctuidae (the owlet moths).

The MONA or Hodges number for Condica mobilis is 9693.
