= Condica claufacta =

Scientific classification
- Kingdom: Animalia
- Phylum: Arthropoda
- Class: Insecta
- Order: Lepidoptera
- Superfamily: Noctuoidea
- Family: Noctuidae
- Genus: Condica
- Species: C. claufacta

Binomial name
- Condica claufacta (Walker, 1857)

Synonyms
- Condica cervina (Smith, 1900)

Species of moth

Condica claufacta is a species of moth in the family Noctuidae (the owlet moths). It is found in North America.

The MONA or Hodges number for Condica claufacta is 9700.
