= Siccia melanospila =

Scientific classification
- Kingdom: Animalia
- Phylum: Arthropoda
- Class: Insecta
- Order: Lepidoptera
- Superfamily: Noctuoidea
- Family: Erebidae
- Subfamily: Arctiinae
- Genus: Siccia
- Species: S. melanospila

Binomial name
- Siccia melanospila Hampson, 1911

Species of moth

Siccia melanospila is a moth in the family Erebidae. It was described by George Hampson in 1911. It is found in the Democratic Republic of the Congo, Kenya and South Africa.
