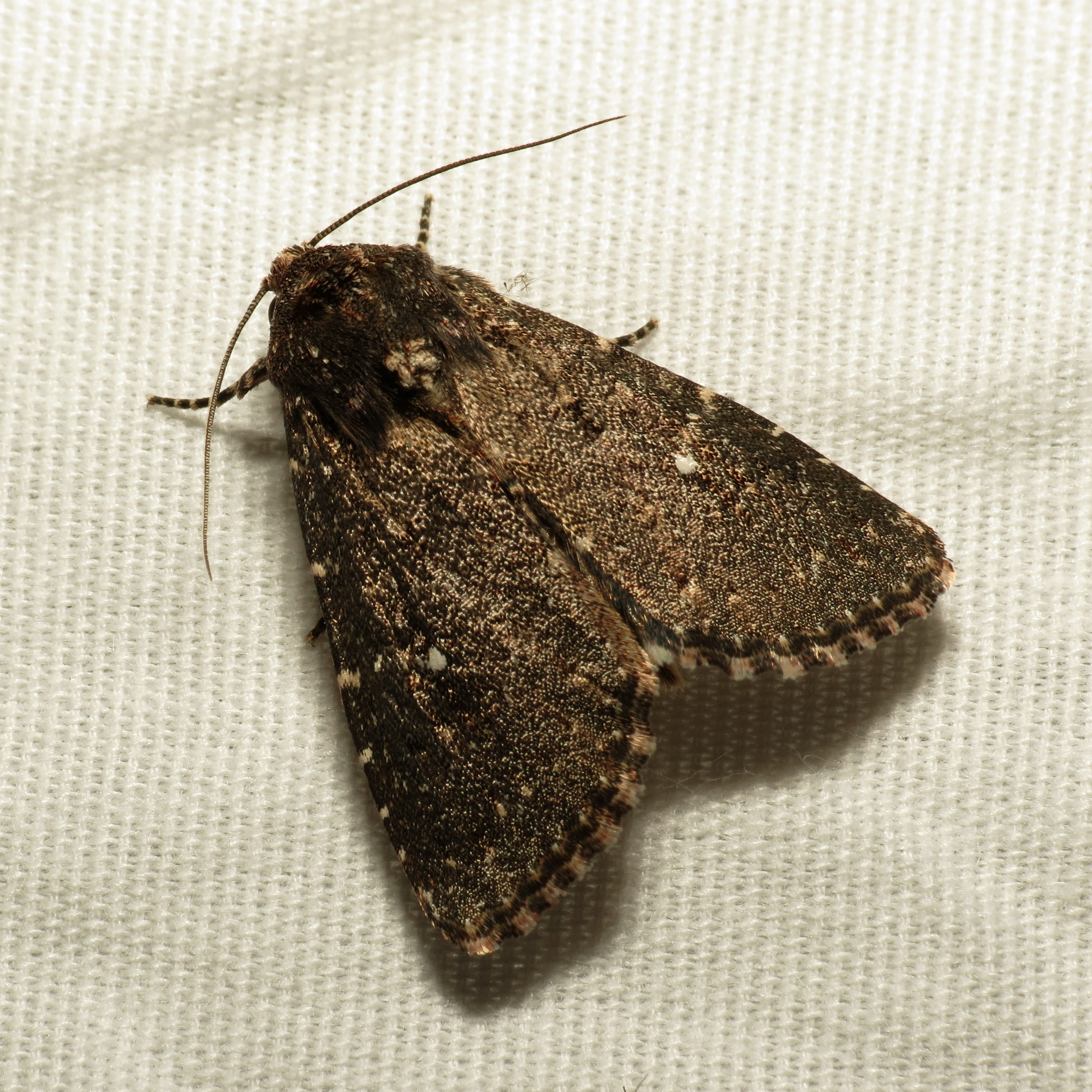

Scientific classification
- Kingdom: Animalia
- Phylum: Arthropoda
- Class: Insecta
- Order: Lepidoptera
- Superfamily: Noctuoidea
- Family: Noctuidae
- Genus: Condica
- Species: C. albolabes

Binomial name
- Condica albolabes (Grote, 1880)

= Condica albolabes =

Species of moth

Condica albolabes is a species of moth in the family Noctuidae (the owlet moths).

The MONA or Hodges number for Condica albolabes is 9695.
