= Siccia tau =

Scientific classification
- Domain: Eukaryota
- Kingdom: Animalia
- Phylum: Arthropoda
- Class: Insecta
- Order: Lepidoptera
- Superfamily: Noctuoidea
- Family: Erebidae
- Subfamily: Arctiinae
- Genus: Siccia
- Species: S. tau

Binomial name
- Siccia tau (Heylaerts, 1891)

Synonyms
- Aemene tau Heylaerts, 1891; Siccia tau Hampson, 1900; Aemene tau Singh, Singh & Joshi, 2014

Species of moth

Siccia tau is a moth of the family Erebidae first described by Franciscus J. M. Heylaerts in 1891. It is found in India, Java, and Sri Lanka.
