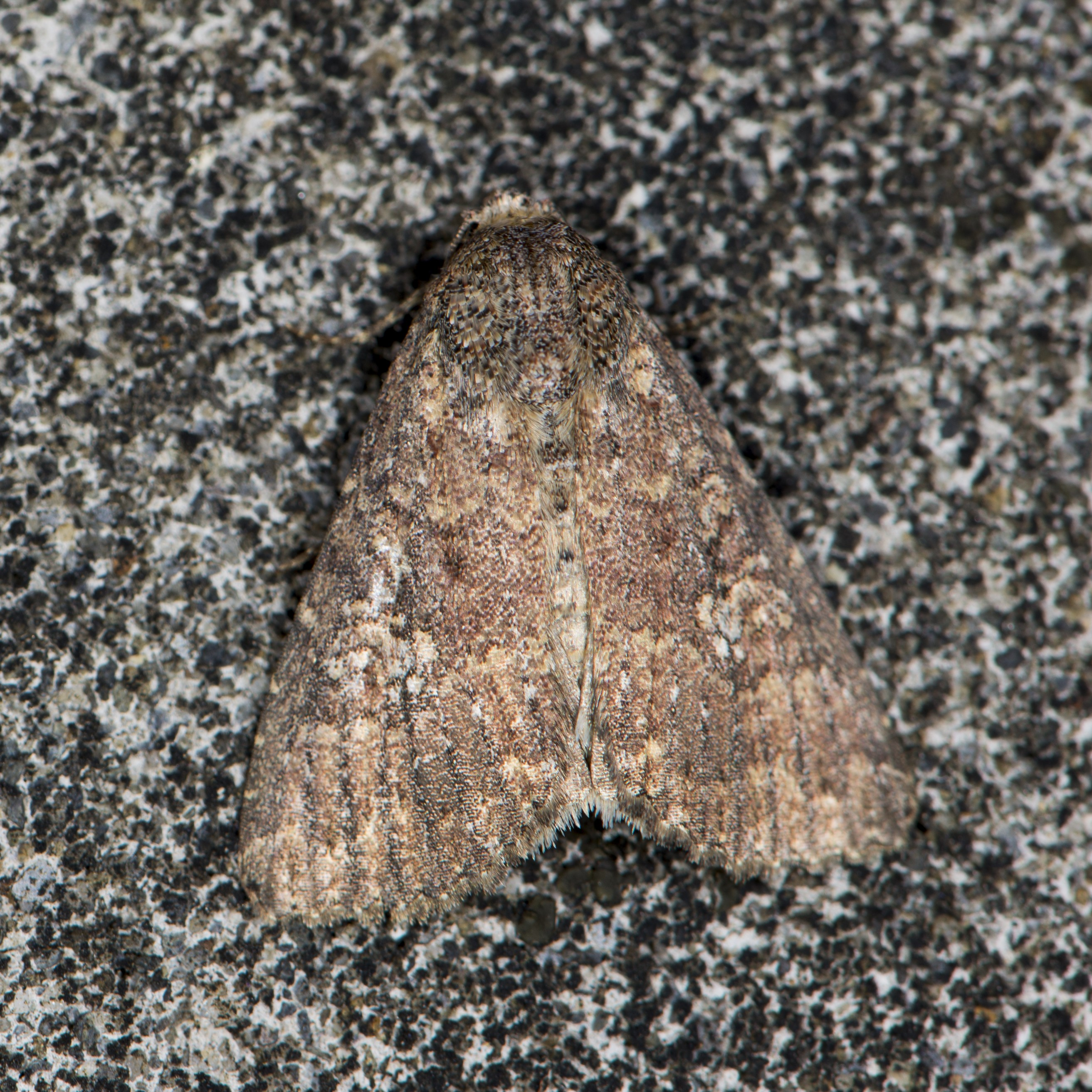

Scientific classification
- Kingdom: Animalia
- Phylum: Arthropoda
- Clade: Pancrustacea
- Class: Insecta
- Order: Lepidoptera
- Superfamily: Noctuoidea
- Family: Noctuidae
- Tribe: Condicini
- Genus: Condica; Walker, 1856

Synonyms
- Gaphara Walker, 1862; Platysenta Grote, 1874; Myrtale H. Druce, 1891; Draudtia Barnes & Benjamin, 1926; Bicondica Berio, 1981; Monocondica Berio, 1981

= Condica =

Genus of moths

Condica is a genus of moths of the family Noctuidae. The genus was erected by Francis Walker in 1856.

== Species ==
- Condica abstemia (Guenée, 1852)
- Condica agnata (Felder, 1874)
- Condica albigera Guenée, 1852
- Condica albigutta (Wileman, 1912)
- Condica albolabes (Grote, 1880)
- Condica albomaculata (Moore, 1867)
- Condica albopicta (Graeser, 1892)
- Condica andrena (Smith, 1911)
- Condica aroana (Bethune-Baker, 1906)
- Condica atricuprea (Hampson, 1908)
- Condica atricupreoides (Draeseke, 1928)
- Condica begallo (Barnes, 1905)
- Condica capensis (Guenée, 1852)
- Condica charada (Schaus, 1906)
- Condica cinifacta (Draudt, 1950)
- Condica circuita (Guenée, 1852)
- Condica claufacta (Walker, 1857)
- Condica concisa Walker, 1856
- Condica conducta (Walker, [1857])
- Condica confederata (Grote, 1873)
- Condica cupentia (Cramer, [1779])
- Condica cyclica Hampson, 1908
- Condica cyclioides (Draudt, 1950)
- Condica discistriga Smith, 1894
- Condica dolorosa (Walker, 1865)
- Condica egestis (Smith, 1894)
- Condica enigmatica (Turati & Krüger, 1936)
- Condica fuliginosa Leech, 1900
- Condica griseata (Leech, 1900)
- Condica hippia (H. Druce, 1889)
- Condica hypocritica Dyar, 1907
- Condica illecta (Walker, 1865)
- Condica illustrata Staudinger, 1888
- Condica leucorena (Smith, 1900)
- Condica lineata (H. Druce, 1889)
- Condica luxuriosa (Dyar, 1926)
- Condica mersa Morrison, 1875
- Condica mobilis (Walker, [1857])
- Condica morsa (Smith, 1907)
- Condica orta Barnes & McDunnough, 1912
- Condica palaestinensis Staudinger, 1894
- Condica pallescens Sugi, 1970
- Condica paraspicea de Joannis, 1928
- Condica parista (Schaus, 1921)
- Condica parva (Leech, 1900)
- Condica pauperata (Walker, 1858)
- Condica praesecta (Warren, 1912)
- Condica punctifera (Walker, [1857])
- Condica pyromphalus (Dyar, 1913)
- Condica roxana H. Druce, 1898
- Condica roxanoides Angulo & Olivares, 1999
- Condica scherdlini (Oberthür, 1921)
- Condica serva (Walker, 1858)
- Condica subaurea (Guenée, 1852)
- Condica sublucens (Warren, 1912)
- Condica subornata (Walker, 1865)
- Condica sutor (Guenée, 1852)
- Condica temecula (Barnes, 1905)
- Condica tibetica Draudt, 1950
- Condica vacillans (Walker, 1858)
- Condica vecors Guenée, 1852
- Condica videns Guenée, 1852
- Condica violascens Hampson, 1914
- Condica viscosa (Freyer, 1831)
