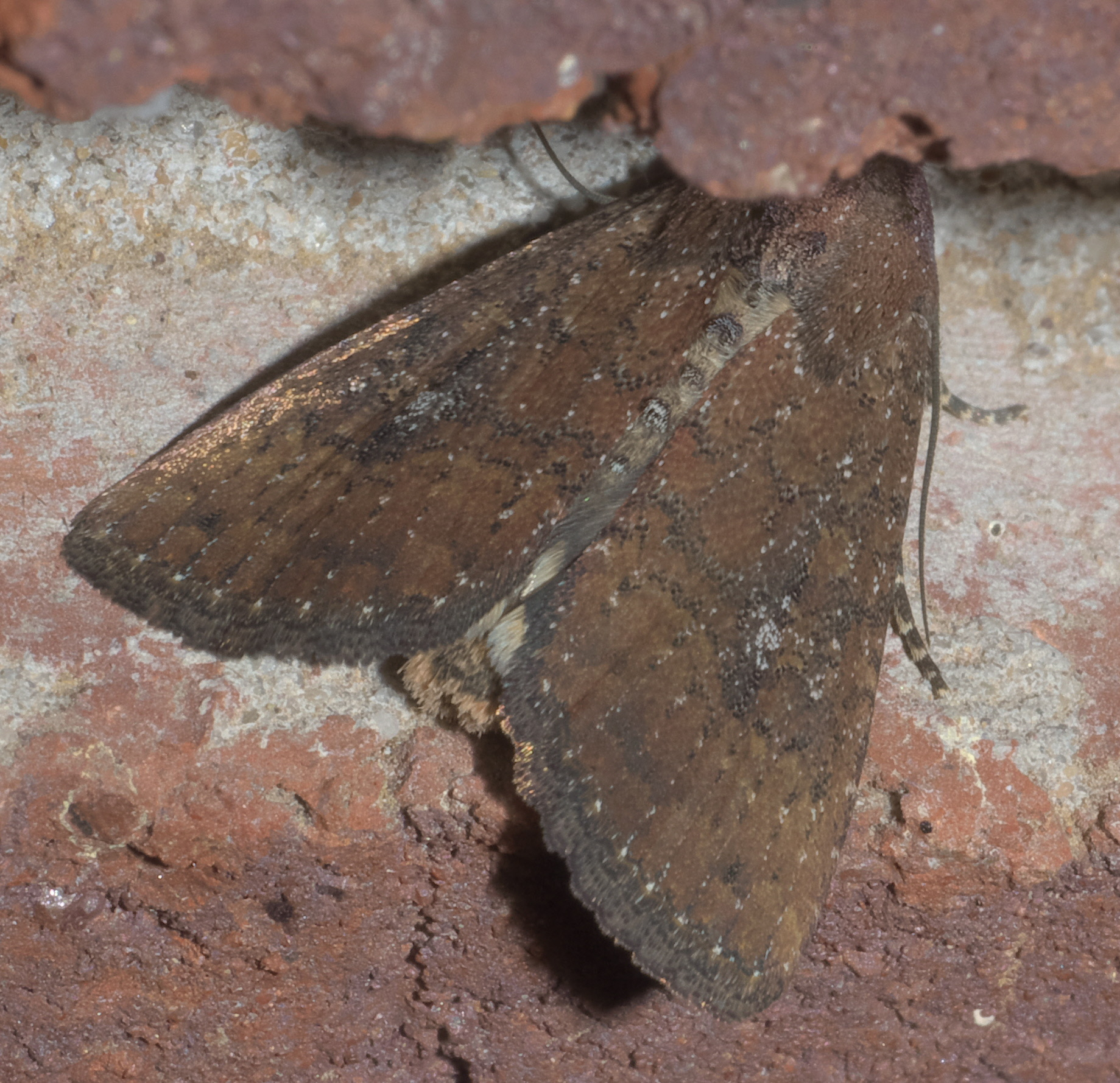

Scientific classification
- Kingdom: Animalia
- Phylum: Arthropoda
- Clade: Pancrustacea
- Class: Insecta
- Order: Lepidoptera
- Superfamily: Noctuoidea
- Family: Noctuidae
- Genus: Condica
- Species: C. sutor

Binomial name
- Condica sutor (Guenée, 1852)

= Condica sutor =

Species of moth

Condica sutor, or the cobbler, is a species of moth in the family Noctuidae (the owlet moths). It is found in North America.
