= Hypotacha alba =

Scientific classification
- Kingdom: Animalia
- Phylum: Arthropoda
- Class: Insecta
- Order: Lepidoptera
- Superfamily: Noctuoidea
- Family: Erebidae
- Genus: Hypotacha
- Species: H. alba

Binomial name
- Hypotacha alba Kühne, 2005

Species of moth

Hypotacha alba is a species of moth in the family Erebidae. It is found in Kenya and Tanzania.
