= Siccia sordida =

Scientific classification
- Domain: Eukaryota
- Kingdom: Animalia
- Phylum: Arthropoda
- Class: Insecta
- Order: Lepidoptera
- Superfamily: Noctuoidea
- Family: Erebidae
- Subfamily: Arctiinae
- Genus: Siccia
- Species: S. sordida

Binomial name
- Siccia sordida (Butler, 1877)

Synonyms
- Aemene sordida Butler, 1877; Aemene subcinerea Moore, 1878; Aemene modesta Moore, 1878; Aemene nigropunctana Saalmüller, 1880; Siccia sordida form. albescens Draudt in Seitz (Ed.), 1914; Siccia conformis Hampson, 1914; Siccia punctipennis ab. teitaensis Strand, 1922; Siccia humilis Rothschild, 1924; Siccia baibarensis Matsumura, 1927; Afrasura terlineata Durante, 2009; Siccia bifurcata Hacker, 2016

Species of moth

Siccia sordida is a moth of the family Erebidae first described by Arthur Gardiner Butler in 1877. It is found in India, China Thailand, Japan, and Sri Lanka. as well as in the afrotropics, Ethiopia, Ivory Coast, Togo, Mali, Nigeria, Zambia, Uganda, Tanzania, Mozambique, South Africa, Eswatini, (including Comoros & Madagascar.

== Synonyms ==
Numerous, please see list.
