= Siccia stictica =

Scientific classification
- Kingdom: Animalia
- Phylum: Arthropoda
- Class: Insecta
- Order: Lepidoptera
- Superfamily: Noctuoidea
- Family: Erebidae
- Subfamily: Arctiinae
- Genus: Siccia
- Species: S. stictica

Binomial name
- Siccia stictica Hampson, 1914

Species of moth

Siccia stictica is a moth in the family Erebidae. It was described by George Hampson in 1914. It is found in Ghana.
