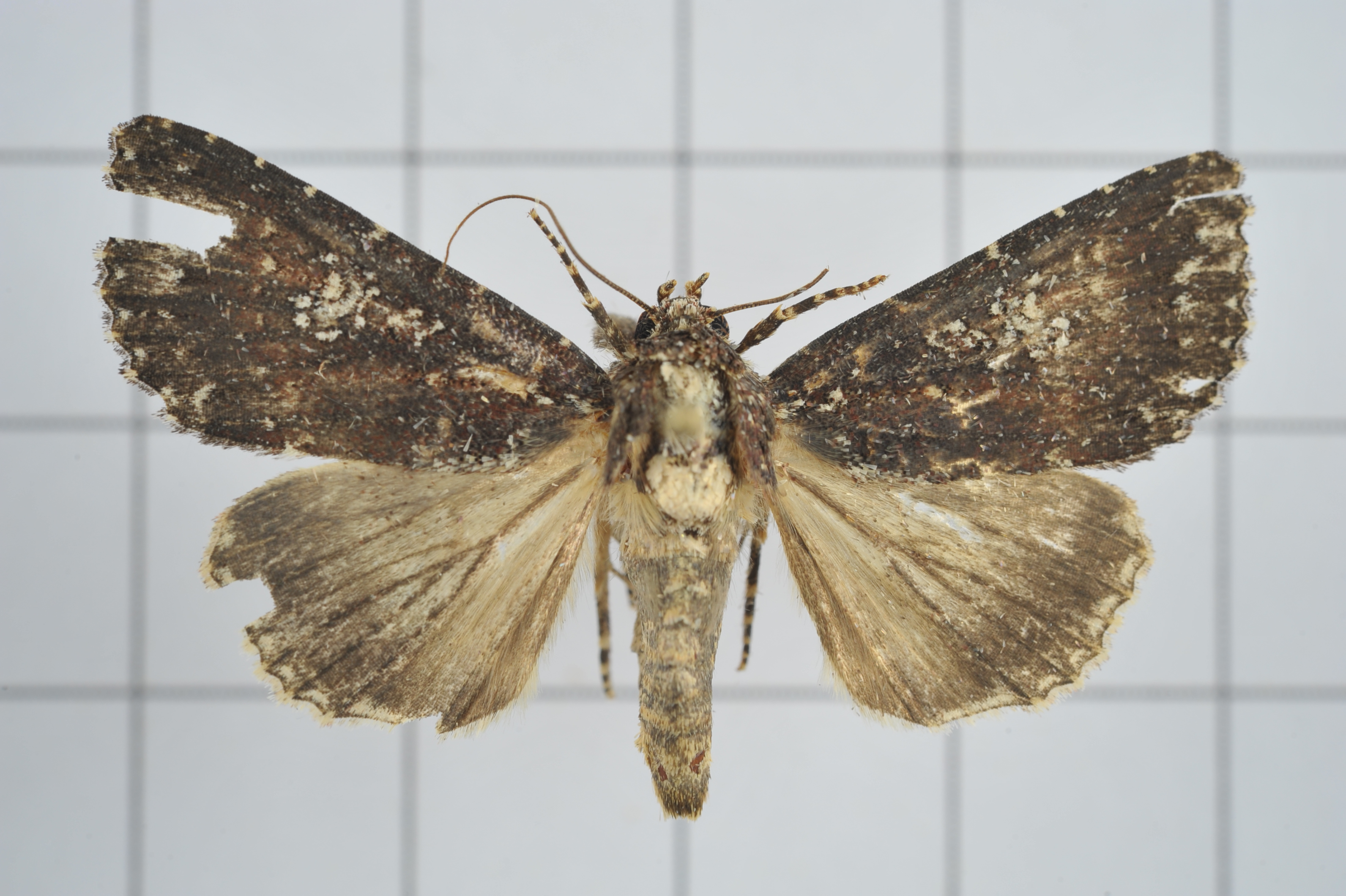

Scientific classification
- Kingdom: Animalia
- Phylum: Arthropoda
- Class: Insecta
- Order: Lepidoptera
- Superfamily: Noctuoidea
- Family: Noctuidae
- Genus: Condica
- Species: C. dolorosa

Binomial name
- Condica dolorosa (Walker, 1865)

Synonyms
- Mamestra dolorosa Walker, 1865; Hadena taprobanae Felder & Rogenhofer, 1874; Perigea atronitens Draudt, 1950; Platysenta dolorosa

= Condica dolorosa =

Species of moth

Condica dolorosa is a moth of the family Noctuidae. It is found in the Indo-Australian tropics, including Borneo, Hawaii, Hong Kong, India, Sri Lanka, Taiwan and Queensland in Australia.

== Description ==
The wingspan is about 40 mm. Adults are dark brown with a complex pale spot near the centre, and an irregular pale mark near the base of the inner margin of each forewing. The hindwings are brown, fading towards the base. Larva smooth, pale green with the anal somite conical. Dorsal and lateral series of purple-brown blotches speckled with white. There is a sublateral series of white dots present. Pupa is greenish with reddish somital bands.
