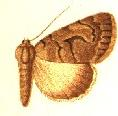
- Hypotacha nigristria

Scientific classification
- Kingdom: Animalia
- Phylum: Arthropoda
- Class: Insecta
- Order: Lepidoptera
- Superfamily: Noctuoidea
- Family: Erebidae
- Tribe: Audeini
- Genus: Hypotacha; Hampson, 1913

= Hypotacha =

Genus of moths

Hypotacha is a genus of moths in the family Erebidae.

== Species ==
- isthmigera species group
  - Hypotacha fiorii Berio, 1943
  - Hypotacha fractura Kühne, 2005
  - Hypotacha indecisa Walker, 1857 (syn: Hypotacha sabulosa Swinhoe, 1884)
  - Hypotacha isthmigera Wiltshire, 1968
  - Hypotacha raffaldi Berio, 1939
- retracta species group
  - Hypotacha alba Kühne, 2005
  - Hypotacha austera Kühne, 2004
  - Hypotacha brandbergensis Kühne, 2004
  - Hypotacha bubo Berio, 1941
  - Hypotacha catilla Kühne, 2004
  - Hypotacha glaucata (Holland, 1897)
  - Hypotacha legrandi (Berio, 1959)
  - Hypotacha ochribasalis (Hampson, 1896)
  - Hypotacha retracta (Hampson, 1902)
  - Hypotacha soudanensis Kühne, 2005
- unknown species group
  - Hypotacha antrummagna Kühne, 2005
  - Hypotacha nigristria Hampson, 1902
  - Hypotacha parva Kühne, 2004
  - Hypotacha pulla Kühne, 2004
