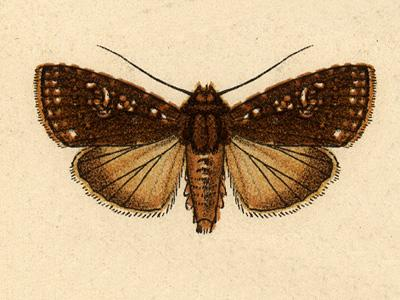

Scientific classification
- Kingdom: Animalia
- Phylum: Arthropoda
- Class: Insecta
- Order: Lepidoptera
- Superfamily: Noctuoidea
- Family: Noctuidae
- Genus: Condica
- Species: C. subornata

Binomial name
- Condica subornata (Walker, 1865)

Synonyms
- Perigea subornata Walker, 1865

= Condica subornata =

Species of moth

Condica subornata is a moth of the family Noctuidae. It is found in Jamaica, Central and South America. It has also been reported from Texas, but this is a misidentification.
