= Siccia decolorata =

Scientific classification
- Kingdom: Animalia
- Phylum: Arthropoda
- Class: Insecta
- Order: Lepidoptera
- Superfamily: Noctuoidea
- Family: Erebidae
- Subfamily: Arctiinae
- Genus: Siccia
- Species: S. decolorata

Binomial name
- Siccia decolorata Toulgoët, 1954

Species of moth

Siccia decolorata is a moth in the family Erebidae. It was described by Hervé de Toulgoët in 1954. It is found on Madagascar.
