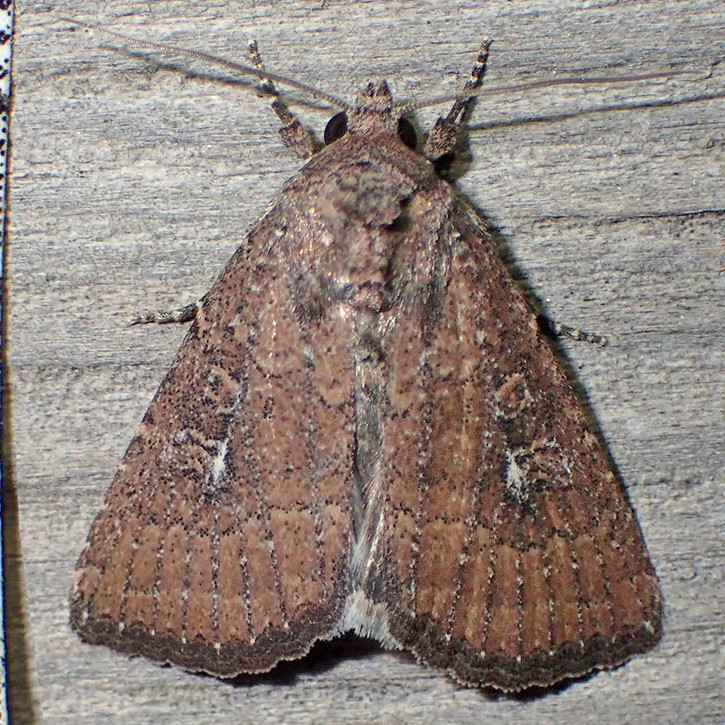

Scientific classification
- Domain: Eukaryota
- Kingdom: Animalia
- Phylum: Arthropoda
- Class: Insecta
- Order: Lepidoptera
- Superfamily: Noctuoidea
- Family: Noctuidae
- Genus: Condica
- Species: C. charada

Binomial name
- Condica charada (Schaus, 1906)

Synonyms
- Condica revellata (Barnes & Benjamin, 1924)

= Condica charada =

Species of moth

Condica charada is a species of moth in the family Noctuidae (the owlet moths). It is found in North America.
