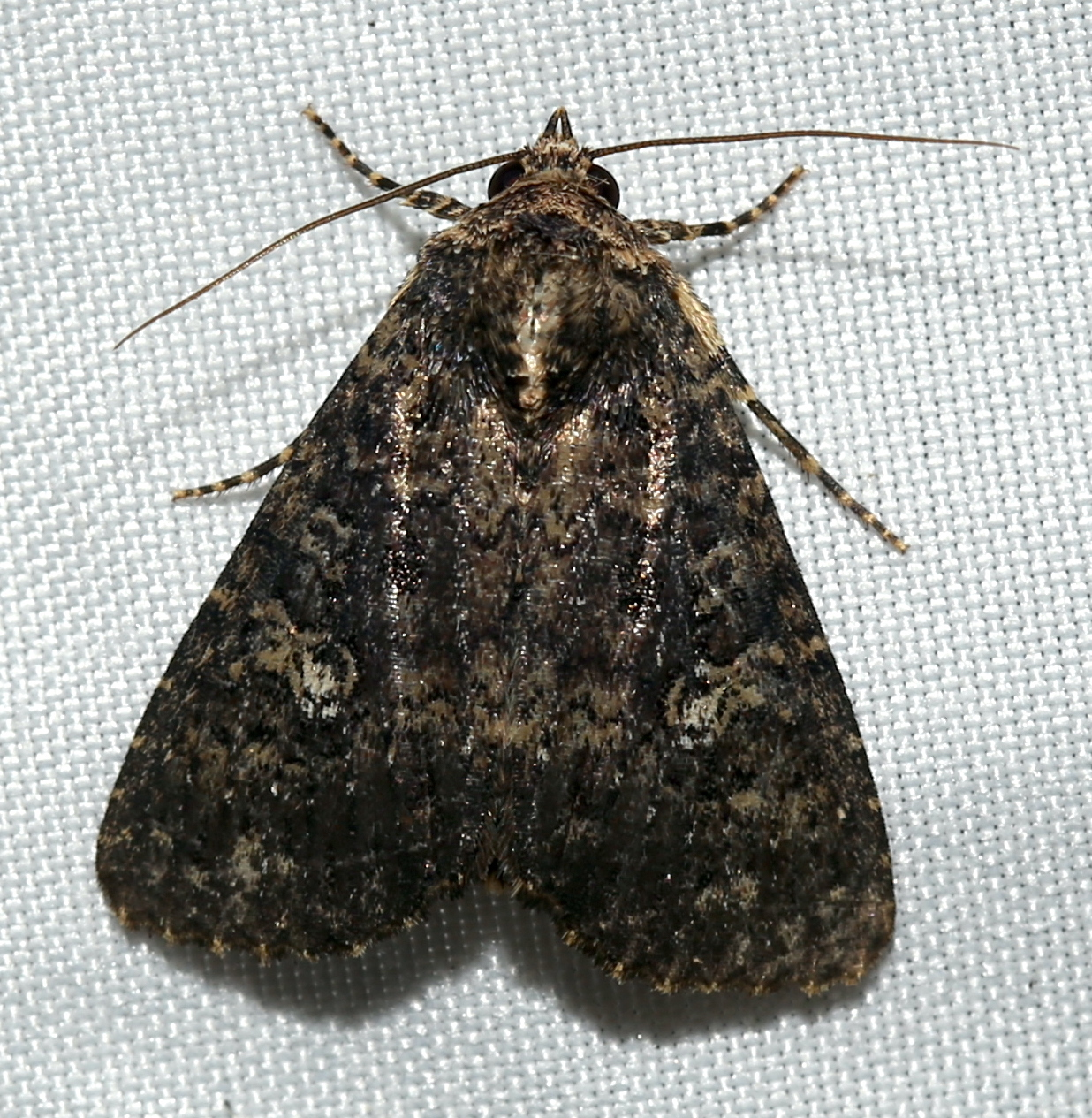

Scientific classification
- Kingdom: Animalia
- Phylum: Arthropoda
- Class: Insecta
- Order: Lepidoptera
- Superfamily: Noctuoidea
- Family: Noctuidae
- Genus: Condica
- Species: C. vecors

Binomial name
- Condica vecors (Guenée, 1852)

Synonyms
- Perigea vecors Guenée, 1852; Platysenta vecors; Apamea remissa Walker, 1857; Platysenta remissa; Platysenta demittens Walker, 1858; Perigea luxa Grote, 1874

= Condica vecors =

Dusky groundling

Species of moth

Condica vecors, the dusky groundling, is a moth of the family Noctuidae. The species was first described by Achille Guenée in 1852. It is found from Newfoundland to Florida, west to Arizona and north to Ontario.

The wingspan is 29–38 mm. They are on wing from May to August in the north and from April to October in the south. There are two generations per year.

The larvae feed on Eupatorium and lettuce.
