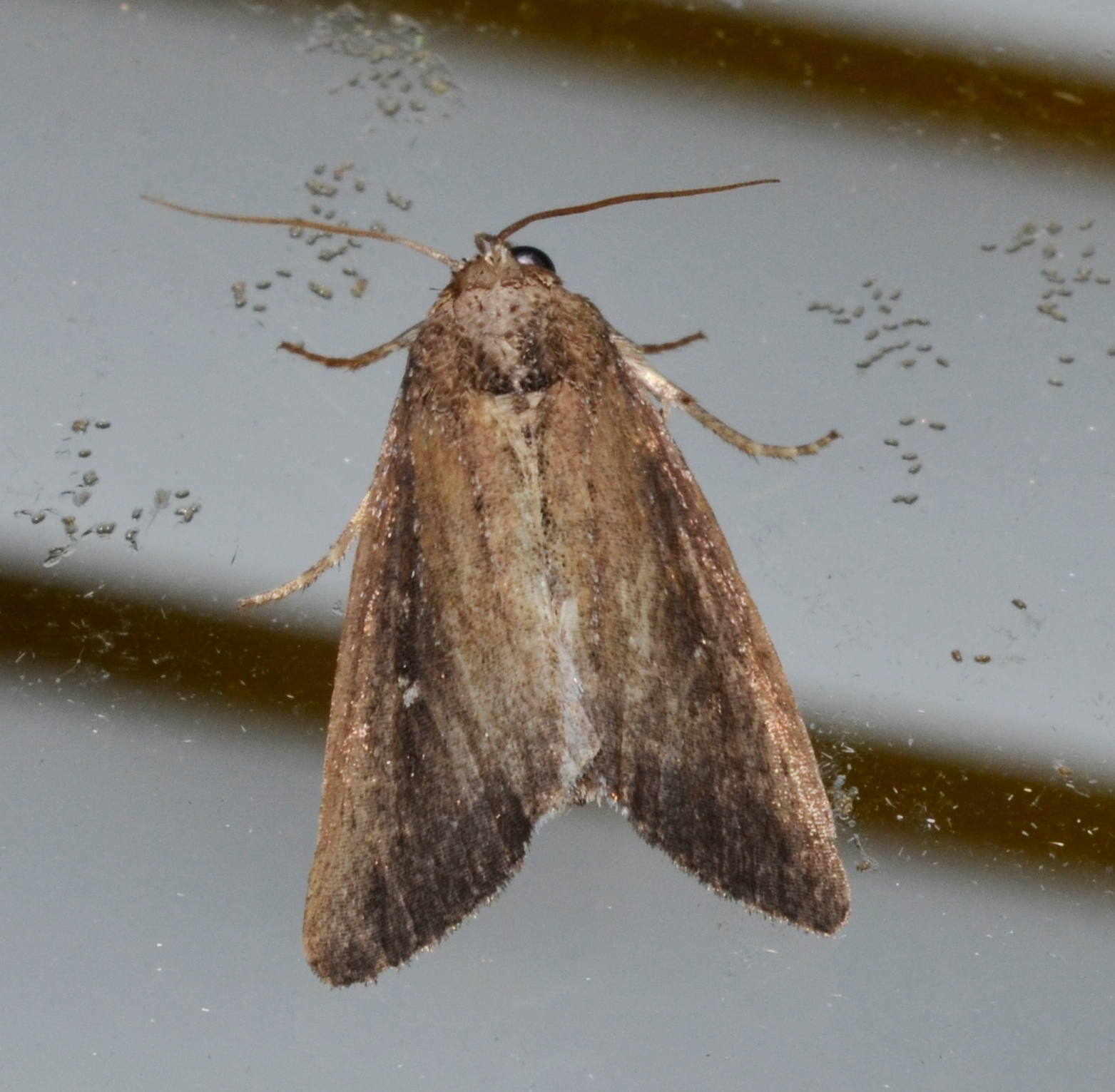
- Adult
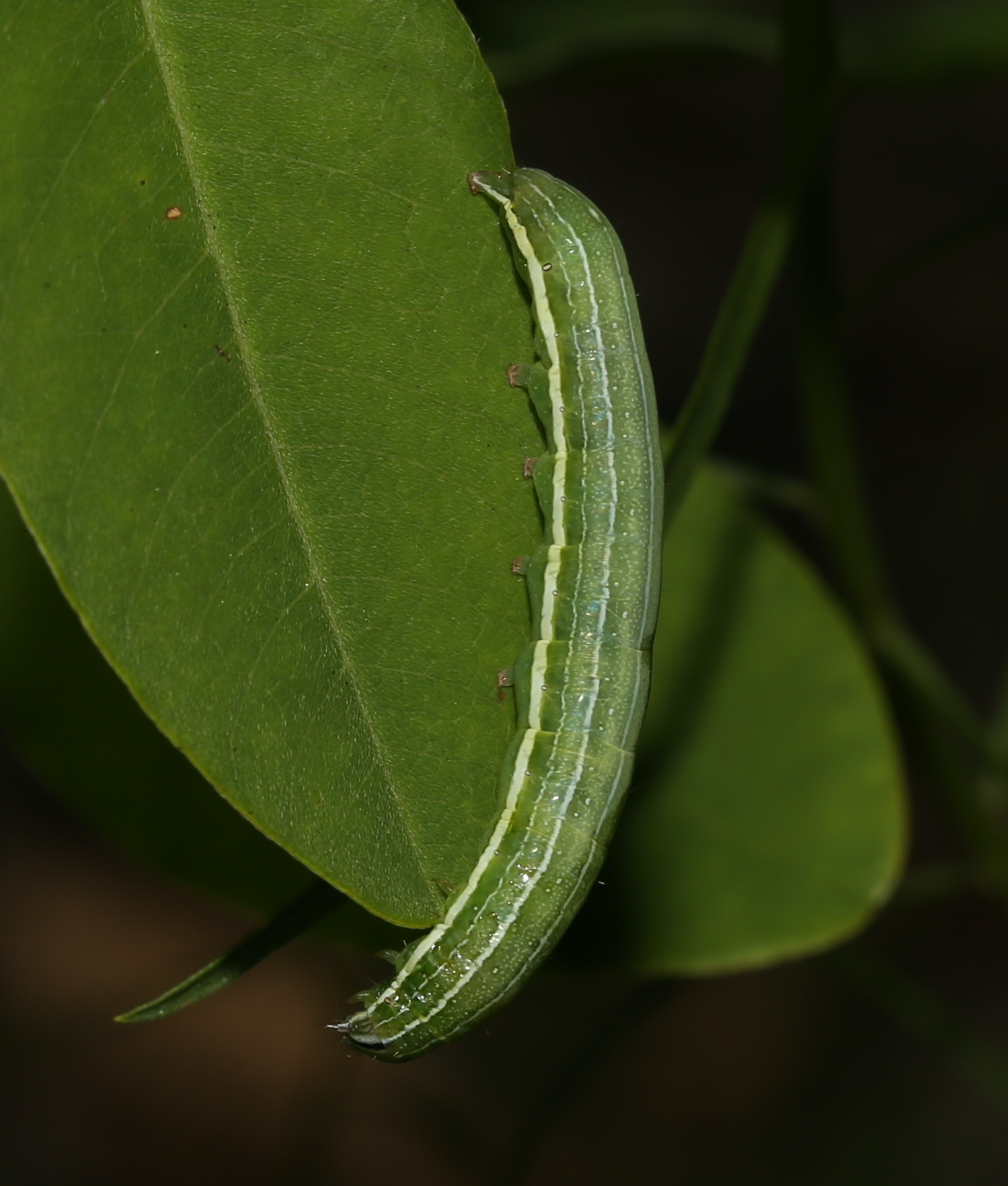
- Larva

Scientific classification
- Kingdom: Animalia
- Phylum: Arthropoda
- Class: Insecta
- Order: Lepidoptera
- Superfamily: Noctuoidea
- Family: Noctuidae
- Genus: Condica
- Species: C. videns

Binomial name
- Condica videns (Guenee, 1852)

Synonyms
- Leucania videns Guenee, 1852; Platysenta albipuncta Smith, 1902; Platysenta atriciliata Grote, 1874; Nonagria indigens Walker, 1857; Caradrina meskei Speyer, 1875

= Condica videns =

Species of moth

Condica videns, the white-dotted groundling moth, is a moth of the family Noctuidae. It is found in North America, where it has been recorded from Texas to Florida, north to Quebec and west to Alberta.

The wingspan is about 28 mm. Adults are on wing from April to September in at least two generations per year.

The larvae feed on the blooms of various composite flowers, including Solidago and Aster species.
