= Hypotacha austera =

Scientific classification
- Kingdom: Animalia
- Phylum: Arthropoda
- Class: Insecta
- Order: Lepidoptera
- Superfamily: Noctuoidea
- Family: Erebidae
- Genus: Hypotacha
- Species: H. austera

Binomial name
- Hypotacha austera Kühne, 2004

Species of moth

Hypotacha austera is a species of moth in the family Erebidae. It is found in Botswana and Namibia.
