= Siccia chogoriae =

Scientific classification
- Domain: Eukaryota
- Kingdom: Animalia
- Phylum: Arthropoda
- Class: Insecta
- Order: Lepidoptera
- Superfamily: Noctuoidea
- Family: Erebidae
- Subfamily: Arctiinae
- Genus: Siccia
- Species: S. chogoriae

Binomial name
- Siccia chogoriae Kühne, 2007

Species of moth

Siccia chogoriae is a moth in the family Erebidae. It was described by Lars Kühne in 2007. It is found in Kenya.
