= Condica concisa =

Scientific classification
- Kingdom: Animalia
- Phylum: Arthropoda
- Class: Insecta
- Order: Lepidoptera
- Superfamily: Noctuoidea
- Family: Noctuidae
- Genus: Condica
- Species: C. concisa

Binomial name
- Condica concisa Walker, 1856

Synonyms
- Condica consocia (Walker); Condica centralis (Walker); Condica imbella (Walker); Condica laphygmoides (Walker); Condica plumbago (Herrich-Schäffer); Condica proxima Morrison, 1876

Species of moth

Condica concisa is a moth of the genus Condica first described by Francis Walker in 1856. The males and females can be hard to tell apart, as they are mostly the same colour (brown), but a distinguishing feature which helps to identify the moth's gender is that the hindwing of the male is white, whereas the female hindwing is light brown. The moths are quite abundant, as they can be found from the northern part of Argentina to Florida and Texas.
