= Siccia guttulosana =

Scientific classification
- Kingdom: Animalia
- Phylum: Arthropoda
- Clade: Pancrustacea
- Class: Insecta
- Order: Lepidoptera
- Superfamily: Noctuoidea
- Family: Erebidae
- Subfamily: Arctiinae
- Genus: Siccia
- Species: S. guttulosana

Binomial name
- Siccia guttulosana Walker, 1863

Synonyms
- Aemene guttulosana Walker, 1863

Species of moth

Siccia guttulosana is a moth of the family Erebidae first described by Francis Walker in 1863. It is found in India and Sri Lanka.
