= Siccia adiaphora =

Scientific classification
- Domain: Eukaryota
- Kingdom: Animalia
- Phylum: Arthropoda
- Class: Insecta
- Order: Lepidoptera
- Superfamily: Noctuoidea
- Family: Erebidae
- Subfamily: Arctiinae
- Genus: Siccia
- Species: S. adiaphora

Binomial name
- Siccia adiaphora Kiriakoff, 1958

Species of moth

Siccia adiaphora is a moth in the family Erebidae. It was described by Sergius G. Kiriakoff in 1958. It is found in Kenya and Uganda.
