= Siccia pustulata =

Scientific classification
- Kingdom: Animalia
- Phylum: Arthropoda
- Class: Insecta
- Order: Lepidoptera
- Superfamily: Noctuoidea
- Family: Erebidae
- Subfamily: Arctiinae
- Genus: Siccia
- Species: S. pustulata

Binomial name
- Siccia pustulata (Wallengren, 1860)

Synonyms
- Lithosia pustulata Wallengren, 1860

Species of moth

Siccia pustulata is a moth in the family Erebidae. It was described by Wallengren in 1860. It is found in South Africa.
