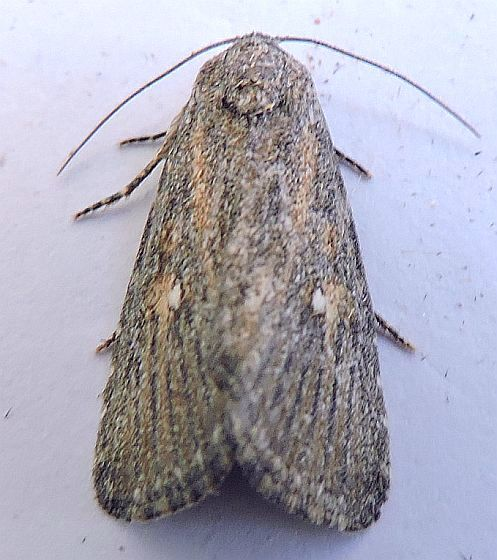

Scientific classification
- Domain: Eukaryota
- Kingdom: Animalia
- Phylum: Arthropoda
- Class: Insecta
- Order: Lepidoptera
- Superfamily: Noctuoidea
- Family: Noctuidae
- Genus: Condica
- Species: C. begallo

Binomial name
- Condica begallo (Barnes, 1905)

= Condica begallo =

Species of moth

Condica begallo is a species of moth in the family Noctuidae (the owlet moths). It was first described by William Barnes in 1905 and it is found in North America.

The MONA or Hodges number for Condica begallo is 9709.
