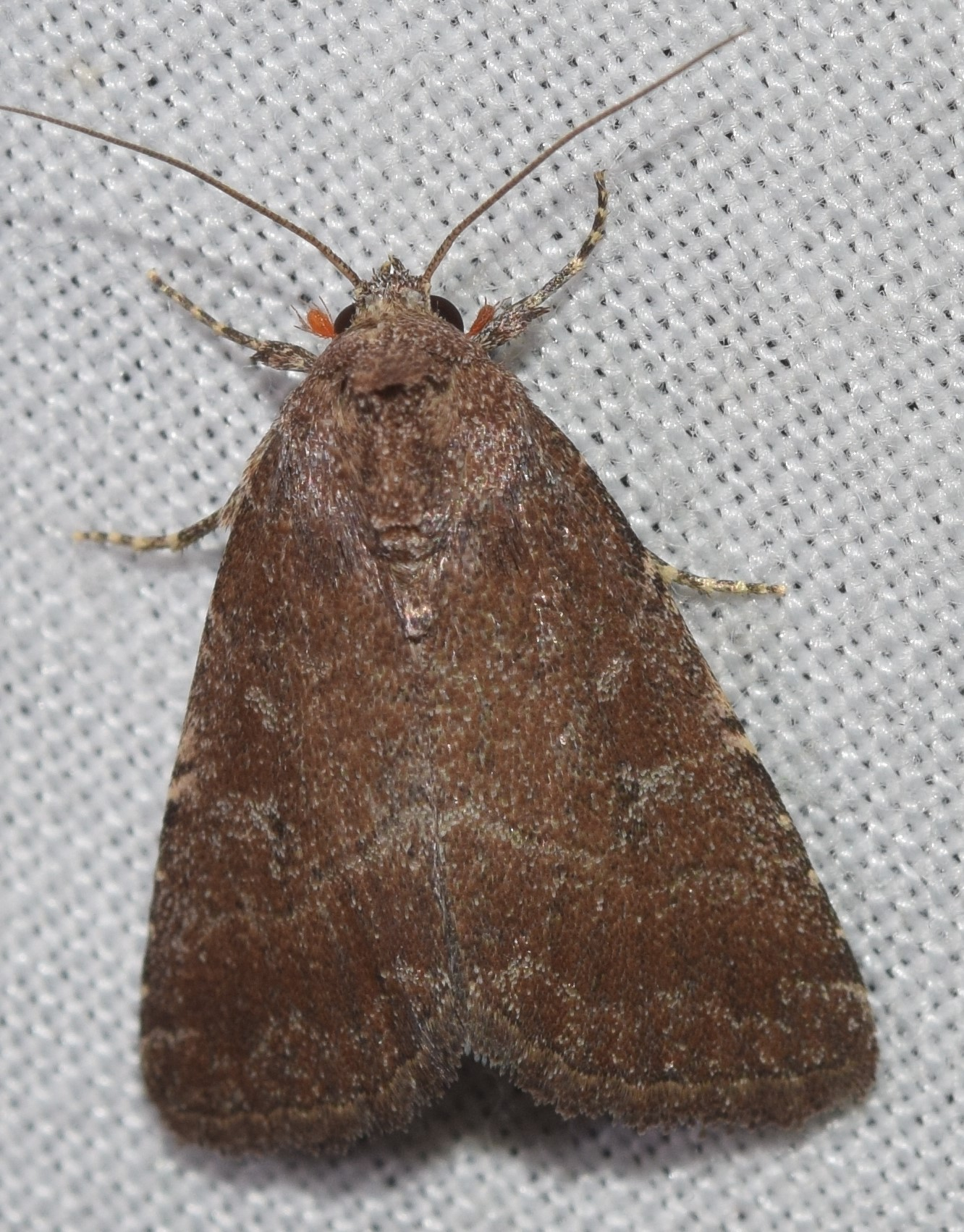

Scientific classification
- Domain: Eukaryota
- Kingdom: Animalia
- Phylum: Arthropoda
- Class: Insecta
- Order: Lepidoptera
- Superfamily: Noctuoidea
- Family: Noctuidae
- Genus: Condica
- Species: C. viscosa

Binomial name
- Condica viscosa (Freyer, 1831)

Synonyms
- List: Mythimna viscosa Freyer, 1831; Hadjina viscosa; Platysenta viscosa; Hadjina viscosa inamoena Warren, 1914; Hadjina indelicata Turati, 1934; Condica europaea Parenzan, 1980

= Condica viscosa =

Species of moth

Condica viscosa is a species of moth in the family Noctuidae. It was described by Christian Friedrich Freyer in 1831. It is found from southern Europe and North Africa to Arabia and the southern parts of western Asia (including Asia Minor, Israel and Iran). The habitat consists of lowland areas near the coast, including dry slopes, road side verges, dry river beds or fallow land.

The wingspan is 25–29 mm.Warren (1914) states H. viscosa Frr. (= implexa Tr.) (47 b). Forewing dull greyish redbrown; the lines and edges of the stigmata marked indistinctly by a few pale scales; hindwing reddish brown, darker in the female. Recorded from Spain, Sicily, and the Canary Islands, and from Syria. Adults are on wing from May to June and in October.

The larvae feed on Inula viscosa, Pluchea discoroides and Pulicaria glutinosa.

== Subspecies ==
- Condica viscosa viscosa
- Condica viscosa meridiana Hacker & Saldaitis, 2010 (Yemen)
- Condica viscosa persicola Wiltshire, 1952
