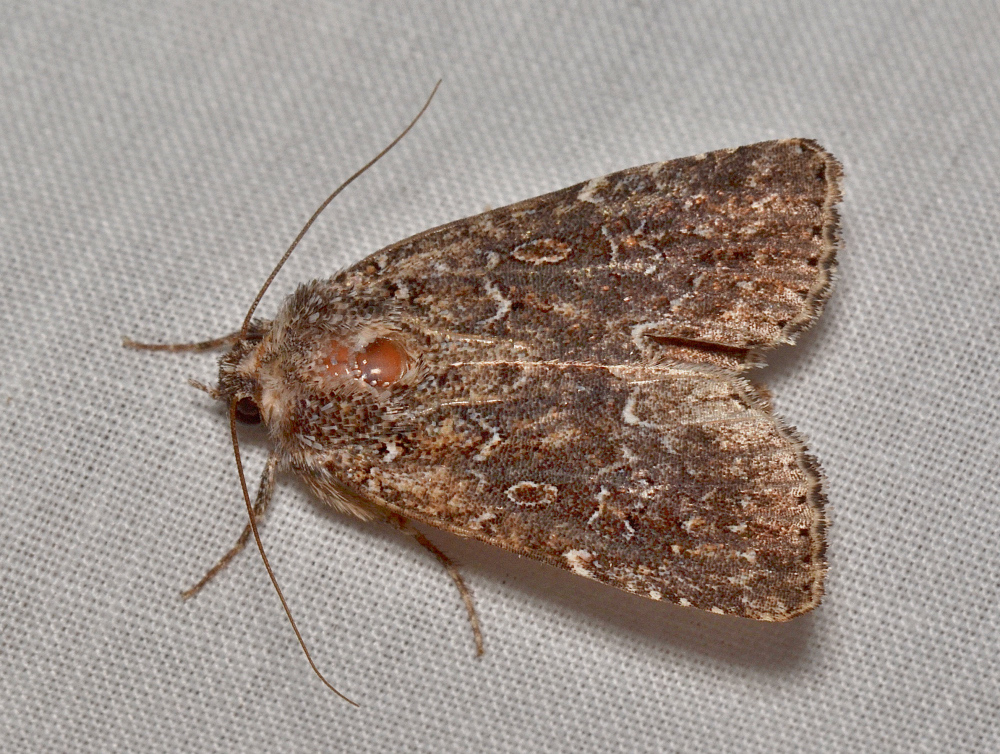

Scientific classification
- Kingdom: Animalia
- Phylum: Arthropoda
- Class: Insecta
- Order: Lepidoptera
- Superfamily: Noctuoidea
- Family: Noctuidae
- Genus: Condica
- Species: C. capensis

Binomial name
- Condica capensis (Guenée, 1852)

Synonyms
- Apamea capensis Guenée, 1852; Perigea capensis

= Condica capensis =

Species of moth

Condica capensis is a moth of the family Noctuidae. It is found across Africa, the Indian sub-continent and South-East Asia. In Europe, it is only common in southern Spain, but can be found further north.

== Technical description and variation ==
Forewing fuscous on a rufous ground, dusted with grey along costa, below and beyond lower angle of cell, and along termen; the veins dark; inner and outer lines conversely lunulate-dentate, the teeth marked by black and white points, the lunules yellow; subterminal line whitish, dentate, preceded by small tooth shaped black spots; claviform stigma small, outlined in black; orbicular small, constricted in middle, the centre brown and ring pale; reniform with centre yellowish in upper half, white in lower, this lower lobe surrounded with small white dots outlined in black; hindwing dull white, the veins and termen suffused with brown, or wholly brown in female. Larva smooth, pale green, the anal segment humped; a series of purplish brown dorsal and lateral blotches dappled with white; a sublateral series of white dots; pupa greenish, with the segmental incisions reddish. The wingspan is 28–36 mm.

== Biology ==
The larvae feed on various herbaceous plants, including Carthamus tinctorius.
