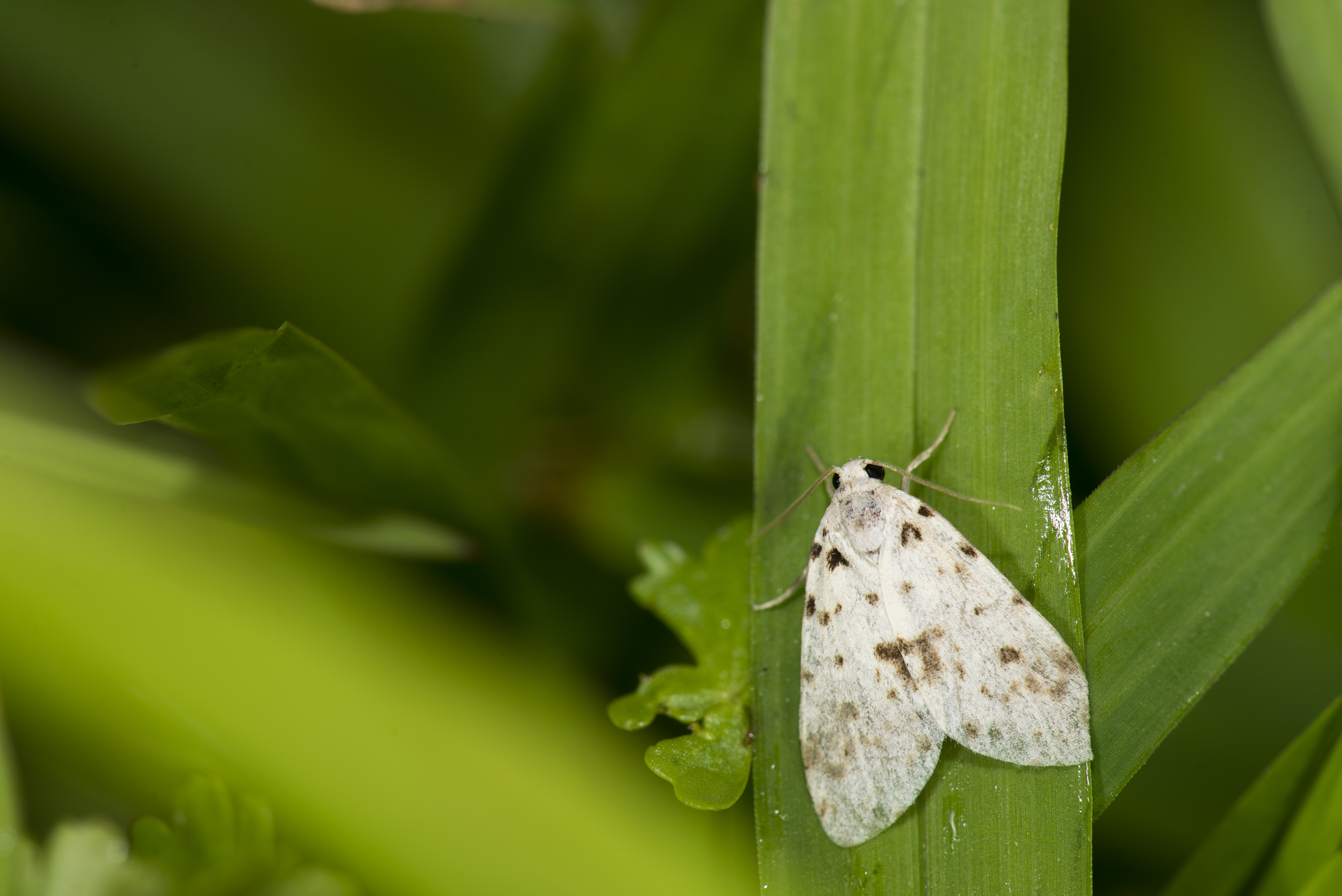
- A Siccia Taiwana

Scientific classification
- Kingdom: Animalia
- Phylum: Arthropoda
- Class: Insecta
- Order: Lepidoptera
- Superfamily: Noctuoidea
- Family: Erebidae
- Subfamily: Arctiinae
- Tribe: Lithosiini
- Genus: Siccia; Walker, 1854

Synonyms
- Melania Wallengren, 1863

= Siccia =

Genus of moths

Siccia is a genus of moths in the family Erebidae. The genus was erected by Francis Walker in 1854.

== Species ==
- Siccia adiaphora Kiriakoff, 1958
- Siccia anserina Kühne, 2007
- Siccia arabica Wiltshire, 1983
- Siccia atriguttata Hampson, 1909
- Siccia bicolorata Romieux, 1937
- Siccia buettikeri Wiltshire, 1988
- Siccia butvilai Ivinskis & Saldaitis, 2008
- Siccia caffra Walker, 1854
- Siccia chogoriae Kühne, 2007
- Siccia conformis Hampson, 1914
- Siccia cretata Hampson, 1914
- Siccia decolorata Toulgoët, 1954
- Siccia dudai Ivinskis & Saldaitis, 2008
- Siccia duodecimpunctata Hampson, 1914
- Siccia eberti Kühne, 2007
- Siccia elgona Kühne, 2007
- Siccia grossagranularis Kühne, 2007
- Siccia gypsia Hampson, 1914
- Siccia guttulosana (Walker, 1863)
- Siccia margopuncta Kühne, 2007
- Siccia melanospila Hampson, 1911
- Siccia microsticta Hampson, 1914
- Siccia minima Hampson, 1900
- Siccia nigropunctana (Saalmüller, 1880)
- Siccia nilgirica (Hampson, 1891)
- Siccia obscura (Leech, 1888)
- Siccia orbiculata Kühne, 2007
- Siccia overlaeti Kühne, 2007
- Siccia pallens Hampson, 1918
- Siccia pallidata Kühne, 2007
- Siccia paucipuncta Hampson, 1918
- Siccia punctipennis Wallengren, 1863
- Siccia pustulata (Wallengren, 1860)
- Siccia quilimania Strand, 1922
- Siccia rarita Kühne, 2007
- Siccia sordida (Butler, 1877)
- Siccia stictica Hampson, 1914
- Siccia tau (Heylaerts, 1891)
- Siccia ursulae Kühne, 2007
- Siccia yvonneae Kühne, 2007
