= Stigmella birgittae =

Scientific classification
- Kingdom: Animalia
- Phylum: Arthropoda
- Class: Insecta
- Order: Lepidoptera
- Family: Nepticulidae
- Genus: Stigmella
- Species: S. birgittae

Binomial name
- Stigmella birgittae Gustafsson, 1985

Synonyms
- Stigmella omani Puplesis & Diškus, 2003

Species of moth

Stigmella birgittae is a moth of the family Nepticulidae. It was described by Gustafsson in 1985. It is present in Gambia, Oman and Saudi Arabia.

== Description ==
The wingspan is 3.6–4.1 mm (0.14–0.16 in) for males.

The larvae feed on Ziziphus mauritiana and Ziziphus spina-christi. They mine the leaves of their host plant.
