= Scythris cucullella =

Scientific classification
- Kingdom: Animalia
- Phylum: Arthropoda
- Clade: Pancrustacea
- Class: Insecta
- Order: Lepidoptera
- Family: Scythrididae
- Genus: Scythris
- Species: S. cucullella

Binomial name
- Scythris cucullella Bengtsson, 2002

Species of moth

Scythris cucullella is a moth of the family Scythrididae. It was described by Bengt Å. Bengtsson in 2002. It is found in the United Arab Emirates, Oman and Yemen.

The wingspan is 7–10 mm.
