= Hypotacha ochribasalis =

Scientific classification
- Kingdom: Animalia
- Phylum: Arthropoda
- Class: Insecta
- Order: Lepidoptera
- Superfamily: Noctuoidea
- Family: Erebidae
- Genus: Hypotacha
- Species: H. ochribasalis

Binomial name
- Hypotacha ochribasalis (Hampson, 1896)

Synonyms
- Pseudophia ochribasalis Hampson, 1896

Species of moth

Hypotacha ochribasalis is a species of moth in the family Erebidae first described by George Hampson in 1896. It is found in Burkina Faso, Ethiopia, Ghana, Kenya, Mauritania, Oman, Saudi Arabia, Sudan, Tanzania, Yemen and Iraq.
