= Scythris elachistoides =

Scientific classification
- Kingdom: Animalia
- Phylum: Arthropoda
- Clade: Pancrustacea
- Class: Insecta
- Order: Lepidoptera
- Family: Scythrididae
- Genus: Scythris
- Species: S. elachistoides

Binomial name
- Scythris elachistoides Bengtsson, 2002

Species of moth

Scythris elachistoides is a moth of the family Scythrididae. It was described by Bengt Å. Bengtsson in 2002. It is found in the United Arab Emirates, Yemen and Oman.

The wingspan is 6–7.5 mm.
