= Phyllonorycter jabalshamsi =

Scientific classification
- Domain: Eukaryota
- Kingdom: Animalia
- Phylum: Arthropoda
- Class: Insecta
- Order: Lepidoptera
- Family: Gracillariidae
- Genus: Phyllonorycter
- Species: P. jabalshamsi

Binomial name
- Phyllonorycter jabalshamsi de Prins, 2012

Species of moth

Phyllonorycter jabalshamsi is a moth of the family Gracillariidae. It is found in the Al Hajar Mountain range in north-eastern Oman in dry, sunny, rocky and sandy disturbed areas at altitudes of about 1,000 meters.

The length of the forewings is 2.5–2.55 mm.
