= Coleophora omanica =

Scientific classification
- Kingdom: Animalia
- Phylum: Arthropoda
- Clade: Pancrustacea
- Class: Insecta
- Order: Lepidoptera
- Family: Coleophoridae
- Genus: Coleophora
- Species: C. omanica

Binomial name
- Coleophora omanica Baldizzone, 2007

Species of moth

Coleophora omanica is a moth of the family Coleophoridae. It is found in Oman.

The wingspan is 6.5-7.5 mm.
