= Hypotacha raffaldii =

Scientific classification
- Kingdom: Animalia
- Phylum: Arthropoda
- Class: Insecta
- Order: Lepidoptera
- Superfamily: Noctuoidea
- Family: Erebidae
- Genus: Hypotacha
- Species: H. raffaldii

Binomial name
- Hypotacha raffaldii Berio, 1939

Synonyms
- Hypotacha fiorii Hacker, 1999

Species of moth

Hypotacha raffaldii is a species of moth in the family Erebidae described by Emilio Berio in 1939. It is found in Eritrea, Oman, Saudi Arabia, Sudan and Yemen.
