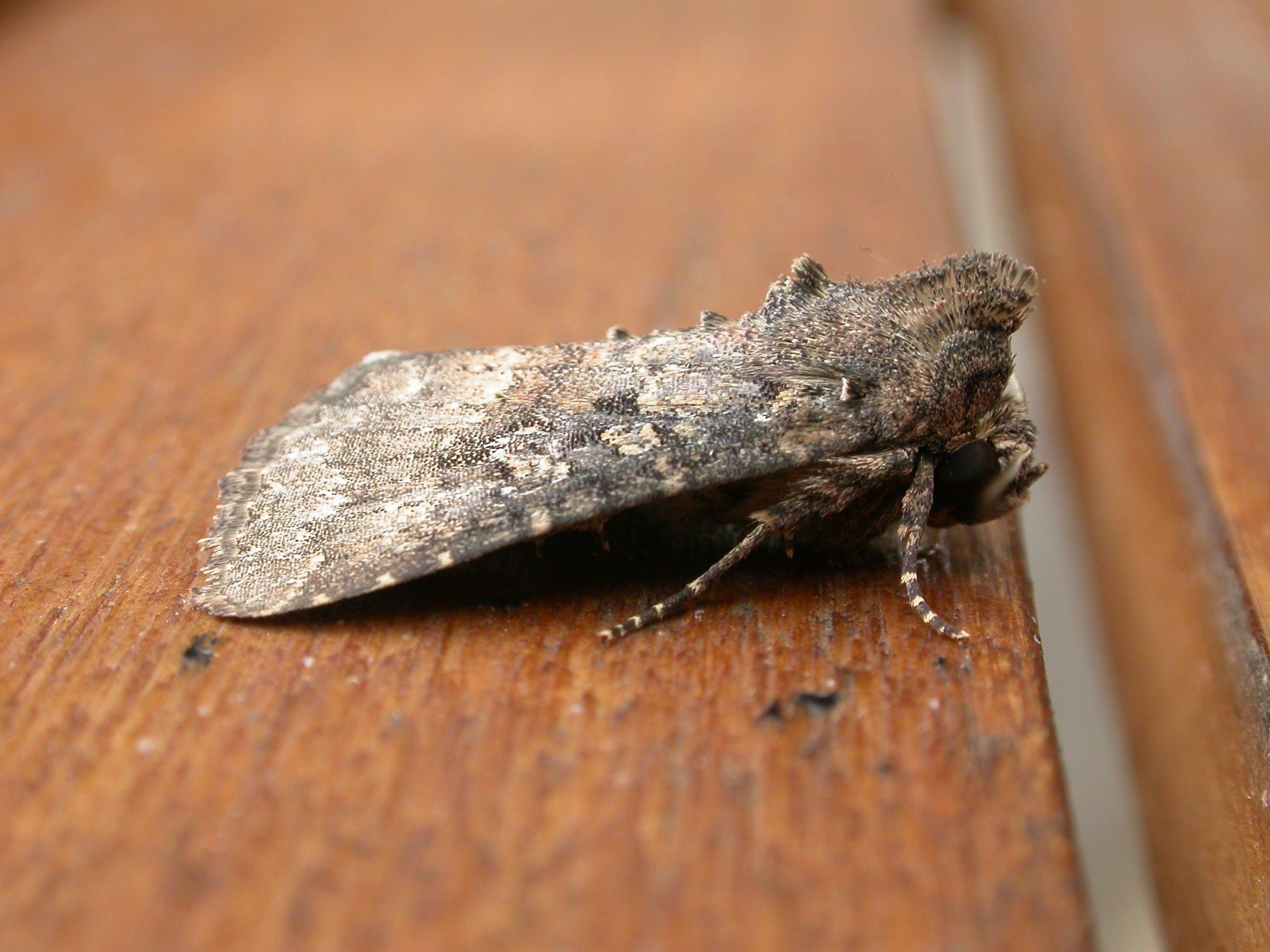

Scientific classification
- Kingdom: Animalia
- Phylum: Arthropoda
- Class: Insecta
- Order: Lepidoptera
- Superfamily: Noctuoidea
- Family: Noctuidae
- Genus: Condica
- Species: C. illecta

Binomial name
- Condica illecta (Walker, 1865)

Synonyms
- Perigea illecta Walker, 1865; Hadena funesta Walker, 1865; Hadena spargens Walker, 1865; Platysenta illecta

= Condica illecta =

Species of moth

Condica illecta is a moth of the family Noctuidae. It is found in both the Indo-Australian and Pacific tropics, including Borneo, Hawaii, Hong Kong, India, New Guinea, the Society Islands, Taiwan and Queensland and New South Wales in Australia. It is also present in New Zealand.

The wingspan is about 40 mm.

Larvae feed on various Asteraceae species, including Ageratum houstonianum, Bidens pilosa and Calendula officinalis. Pupation takes place in the soil.
