= Scythris alhamrae =

Scientific classification
- Kingdom: Animalia
- Phylum: Arthropoda
- Clade: Pancrustacea
- Class: Insecta
- Order: Lepidoptera
- Family: Scythrididae
- Genus: Scythris
- Species: S. alhamrae

Binomial name
- Scythris alhamrae Bengtsson, 2002

Species of moth

Scythris alhamrae is a moth of the family Scythrididae. It was described by Bengt Å. Bengtsson in 2002. It is found in Oman.

The wingspan is 12.5–14 mm (0.49–0.55 in).

== Etymology ==
The species is named after Al Hamra, the type locality.
