= Coleophora eilatica =

Scientific classification
- Kingdom: Animalia
- Phylum: Arthropoda
- Clade: Pancrustacea
- Class: Insecta
- Order: Lepidoptera
- Family: Coleophoridae
- Genus: Coleophora
- Species: C. eilatica

Binomial name
- Coleophora eilatica Baldizzone, 1994

Species of moth

Coleophora eilatica is a moth of the family Coleophoridae. It is found in Iran, Israel, Morocco, the United Arab Emirates, Oman and Yemen.
