= Siccia dudai =

Scientific classification
- Kingdom: Animalia
- Phylum: Arthropoda
- Clade: Pancrustacea
- Class: Insecta
- Order: Lepidoptera
- Superfamily: Noctuoidea
- Family: Erebidae
- Subfamily: Arctiinae
- Genus: Siccia
- Species: S. dudai

Binomial name
- Siccia dudai Ivinskis & Saldaitis, 2008

Species of moth

Siccia dudai is a moth in the family Erebidae. It was described by Povilas Ivinskis and Aidas Saldaitis in 2008. It is found in Oman.
