= Edward P. Wiltshire =

British diplomat and entomologist

Edward Parr Wiltshire
- Born: 18 February 1910; Gorleston-on-Sea, England
- Died: 2004 (aged 93–94)
- Occupations: Diplomat, entomologist
- Employer: Foreign and Commonwealth Office

Edward Parr Wiltshire (18 February 1910 – 2004) was a British diplomat who developed an international reputation as an entomologist in his spare time.

Wiltshire worked in the British diplomatic service. Edward Parr Wiltshire served in the consular service for over four decades, with postings primarily in the Middle East, as well as in South America and Europe. He is listed in the British Diplomatic Directory (1820–2005), published by the Foreign and Commonwealth Office.

== Personal life ==
He was born in Gorleston-on-Sea, England in 1910. He had an elder brother named Thomas. Their father worked as a solicitor in nearby Great Yarmouth. Following their grandmother’s death in 1911, the family relocated from Yarmouth Beach to Bradwell House, situated about a mile inland and owned by the family since 1868.

== Scientific authorship ==
The zoological author abbreviation Wiltshire is used to indicate Edward Parr Wiltshire as the author of a scientific name in zoological nomenclature.
