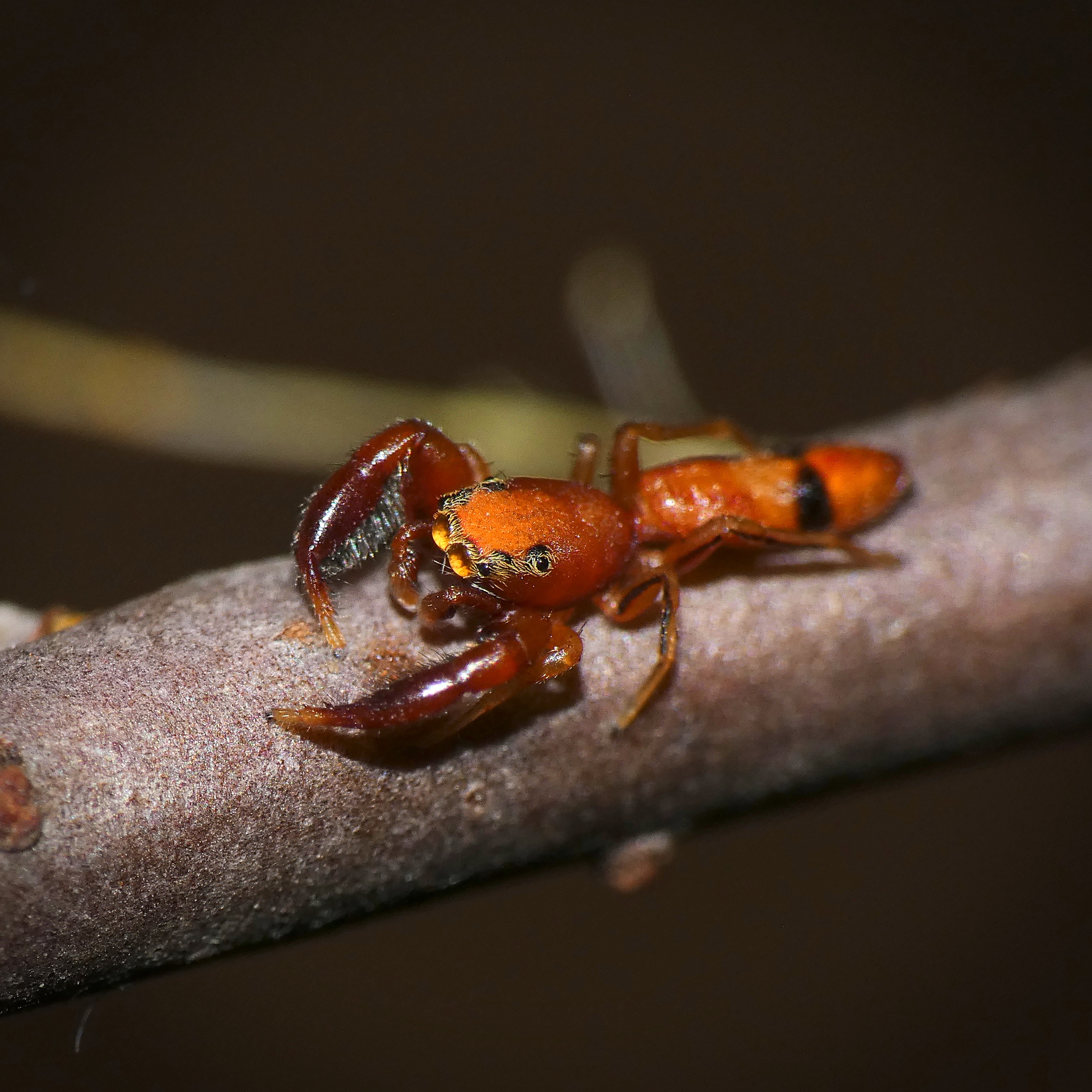
- P. bimaculata
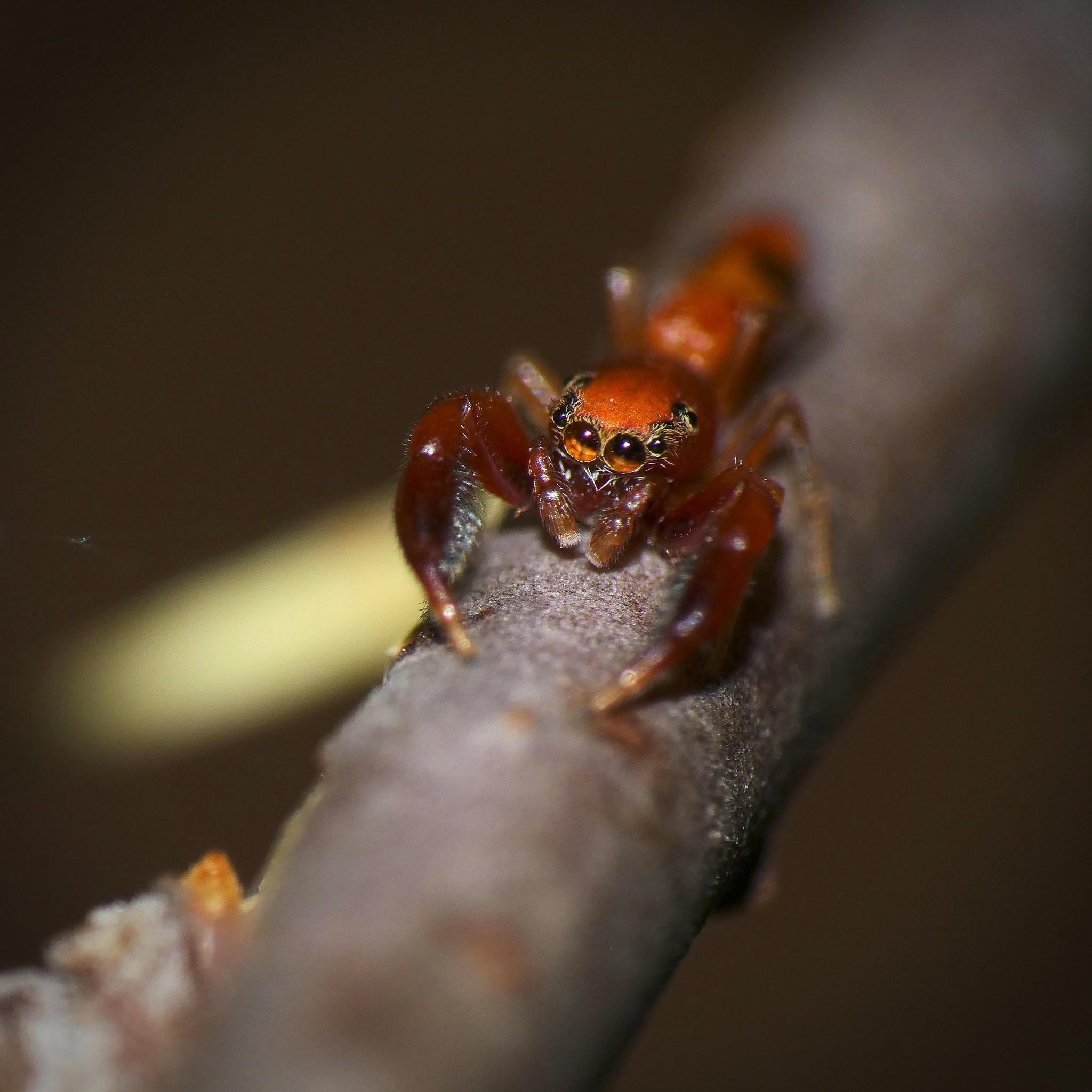
- P. bimaculata

Scientific classification
- Kingdom: Animalia
- Phylum: Arthropoda
- Subphylum: Chelicerata
- Class: Arachnida
- Order: Araneae
- Infraorder: Araneomorphae
- Family: Salticidae
- Genus: Planamarengo; Azarkina & Haddad, 2020

Type species
- Copocrossa bimaculata (G. W. Peckham & E. G. Peckham, 1903)

Species
- Planamarengo bimaculata (G. W. Peckham & E. G. Peckham, 1903); Planamarengo gatamaiyu Azarkina & Haddad, 2020; Planamarengo kenyaensis Azarkina & Haddad, 2020

= Planamarengo =

Genus of jumping spiders

Planamarengo is a genus of sub-Saharan African jumping spiders first described by Galina N. Azarkina and Charles R. Haddad in 2020. The type species, Planamarengo bimaculata, was originally described under the name "Copocrossa bimaculata", but was moved to a new genus in 2020 when two similar species were discovered in Kenya.

== Species ==
As of October 2025, this genus includes three species:

- Planamarengo bimaculata (G. W. Peckham & E. G. Peckham, 1903) – South Africa (type species)
- Planamarengo gatamaiyu Azarkina & Haddad, 2020 – Kenya
- Planamarengo kenyaensis Azarkina & Haddad, 2020 – Uganda, Kenya

== See also ==
- Copocrossa
- Afromarengo
- List of Salticidae genera
