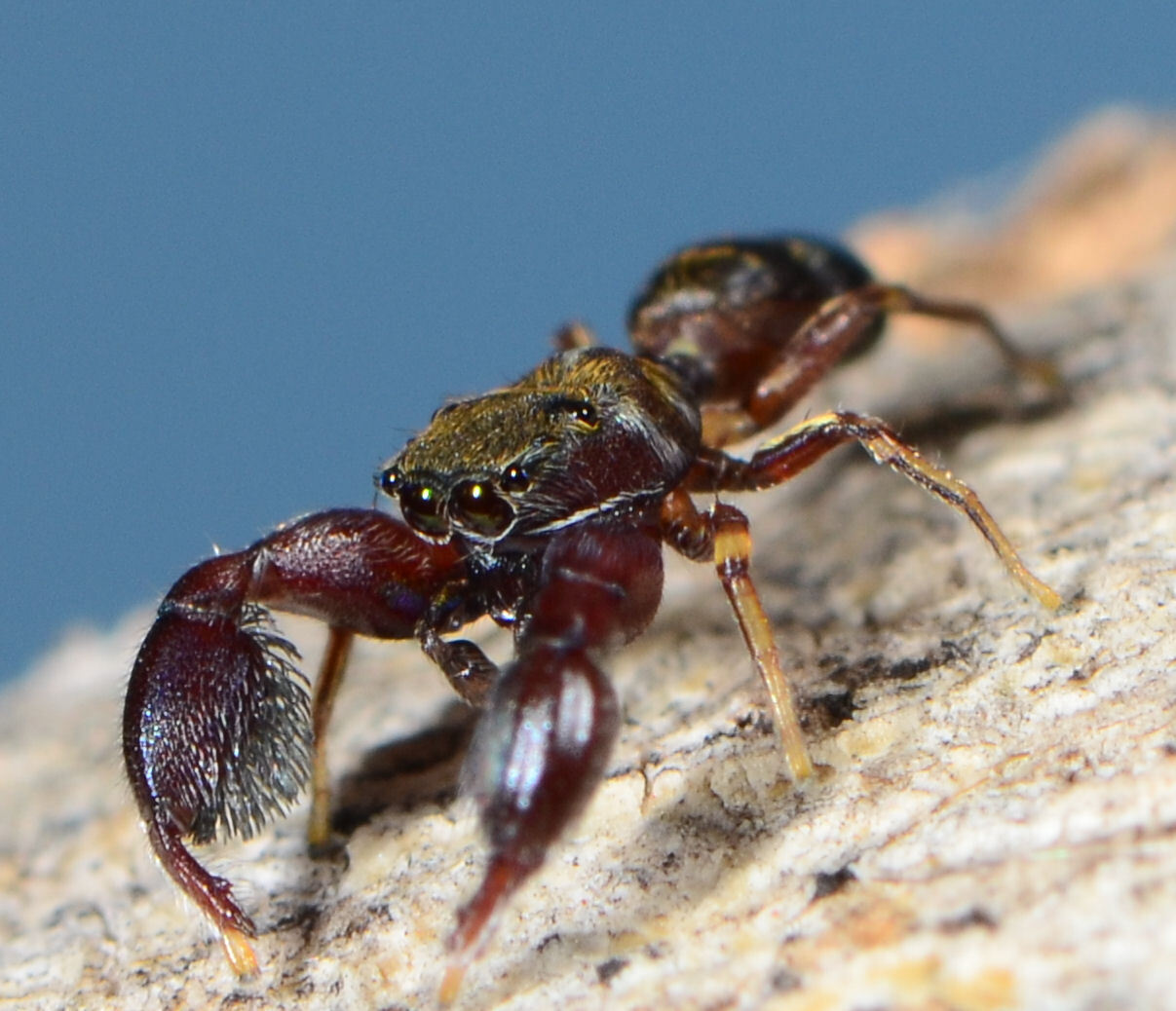
- male
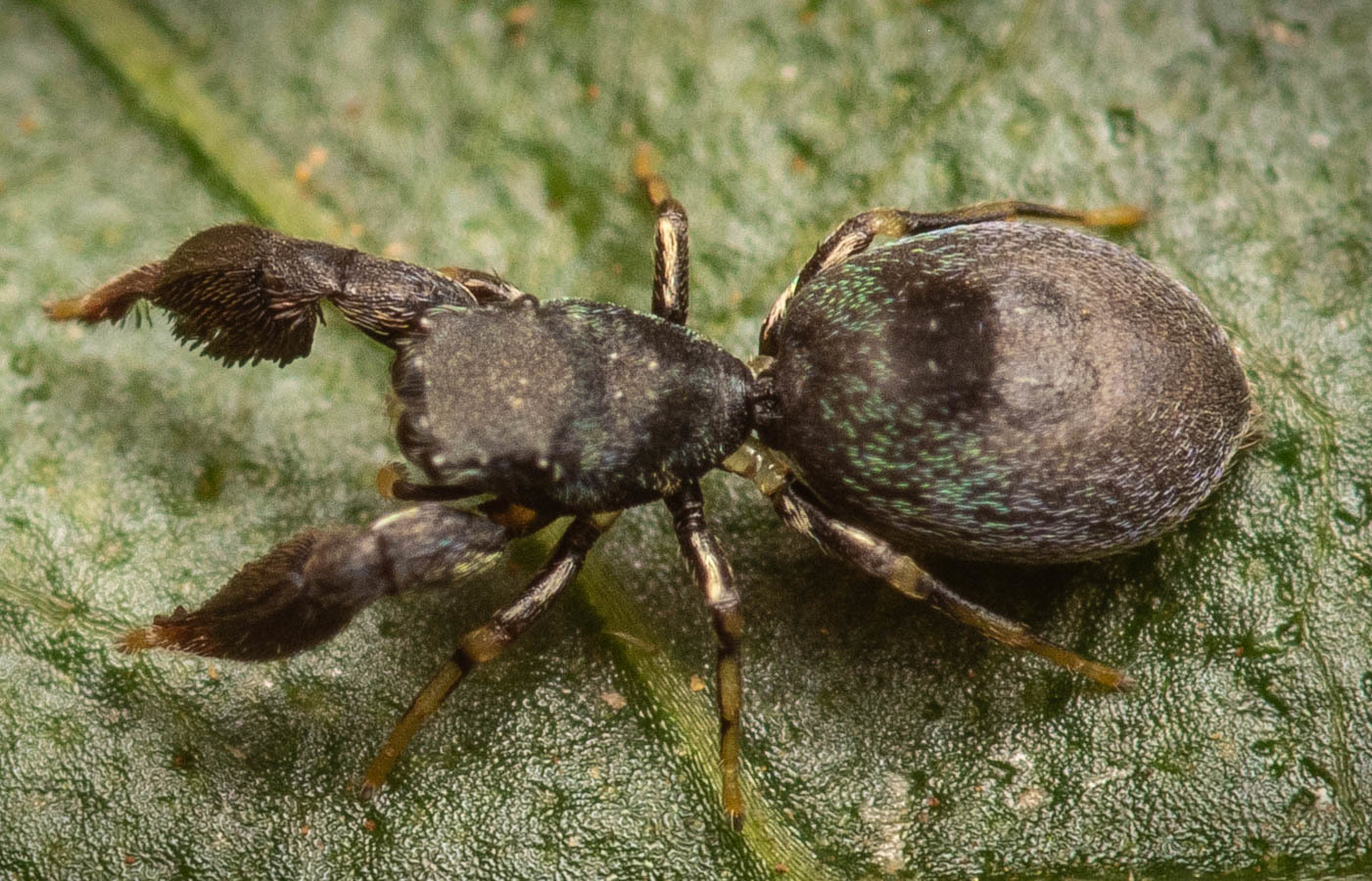
- female

Scientific classification
- Kingdom: Animalia
- Phylum: Arthropoda
- Subphylum: Chelicerata
- Class: Arachnida
- Order: Araneae
- Infraorder: Araneomorphae
- Family: Salticidae
- Genus: Afromarengo
- Species: A. coriacea

Binomial name
- Afromarengo coriacea (Simon, 1900)

Synonyms
- Marengo coriacea Simon, 1900; Marengo kibonotensis Lessert, 1925

= Afromarengo coriacea =

Back-Flipping Afromarengo Jumping Spider

Species of spider

Afromarengo coriacea is a species of jumping spider in the family Salticidae. It is found in Africa and is commonly known as the back-flipping Afromarengo jumping spider.

== Distribution ==
Afromarengo coriacea is found in Guinea, Ivory Coast, Democratic Republic of the Congo, Kenya, Tanzania, Mozambique, and South Africa. In South Africa, the species is known only from KwaZulu-Natal province. Specific localities include Durban, iSimangaliso Wetland Park, Kloof, Ndumo Game Reserve, Tembe Elephant Park, and Umhlanga Rocks.

== Description ==
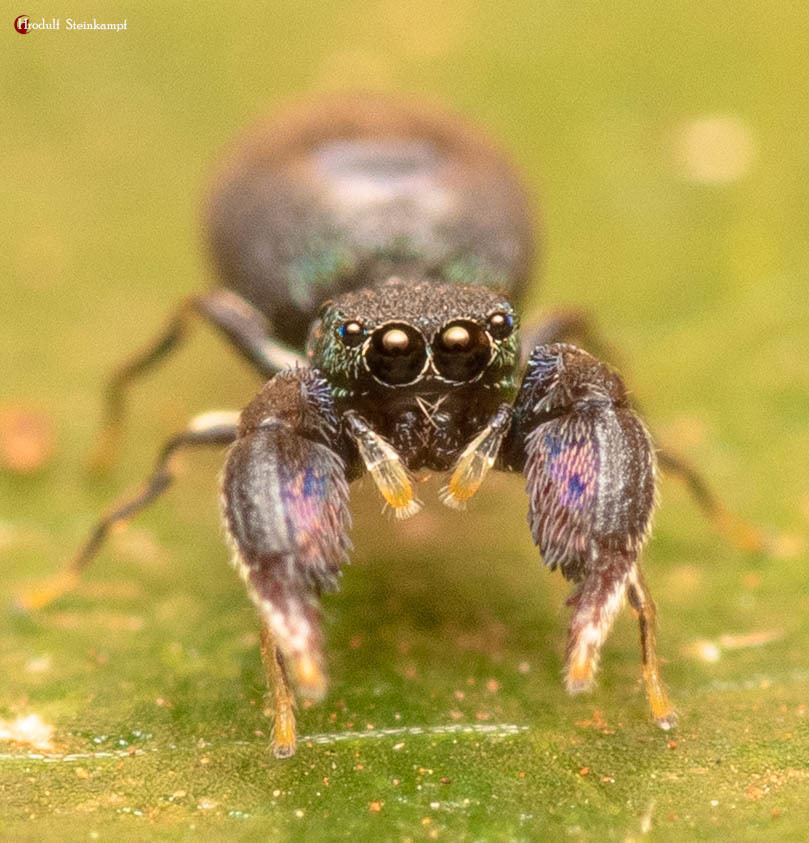
female

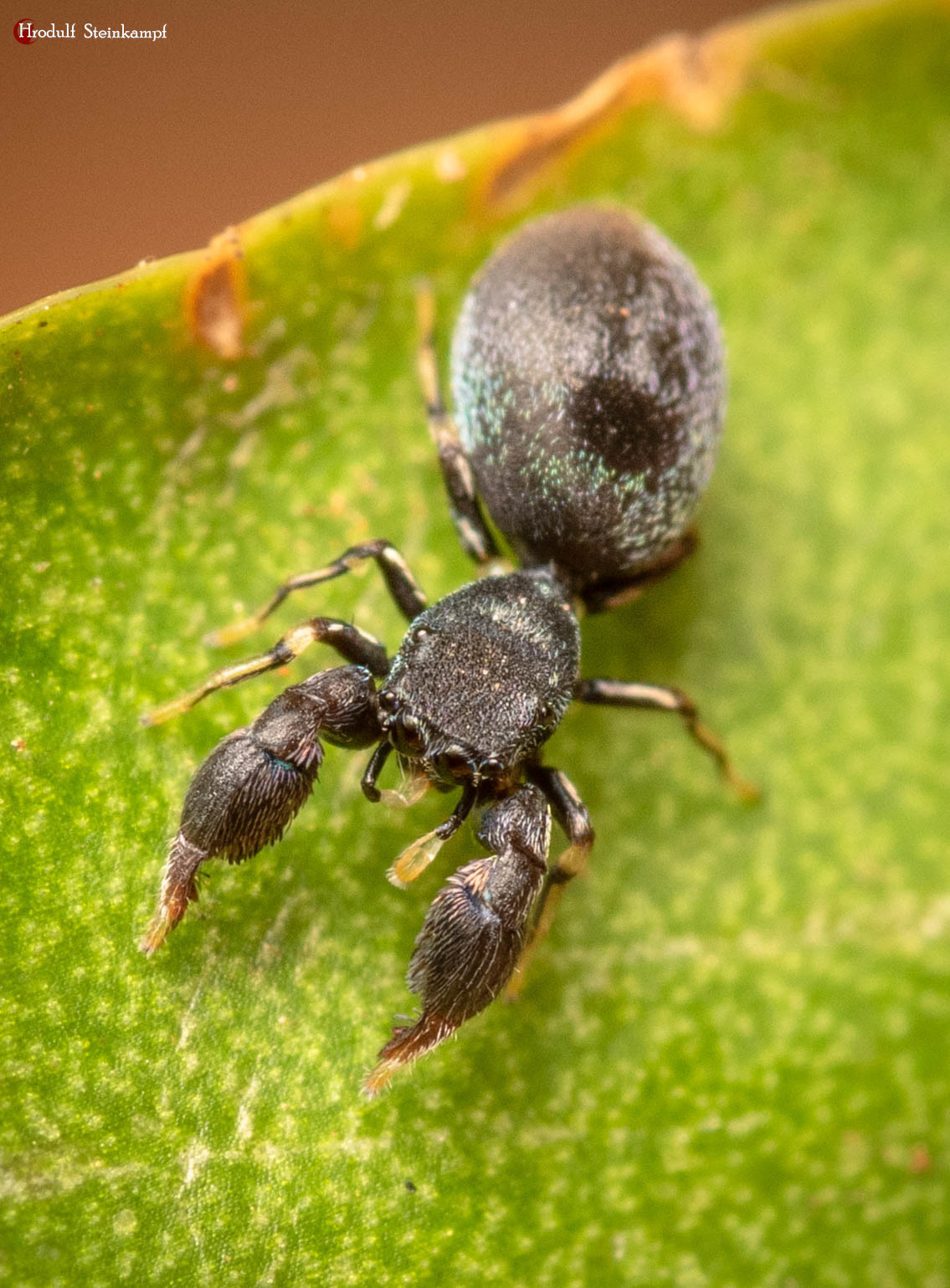
female

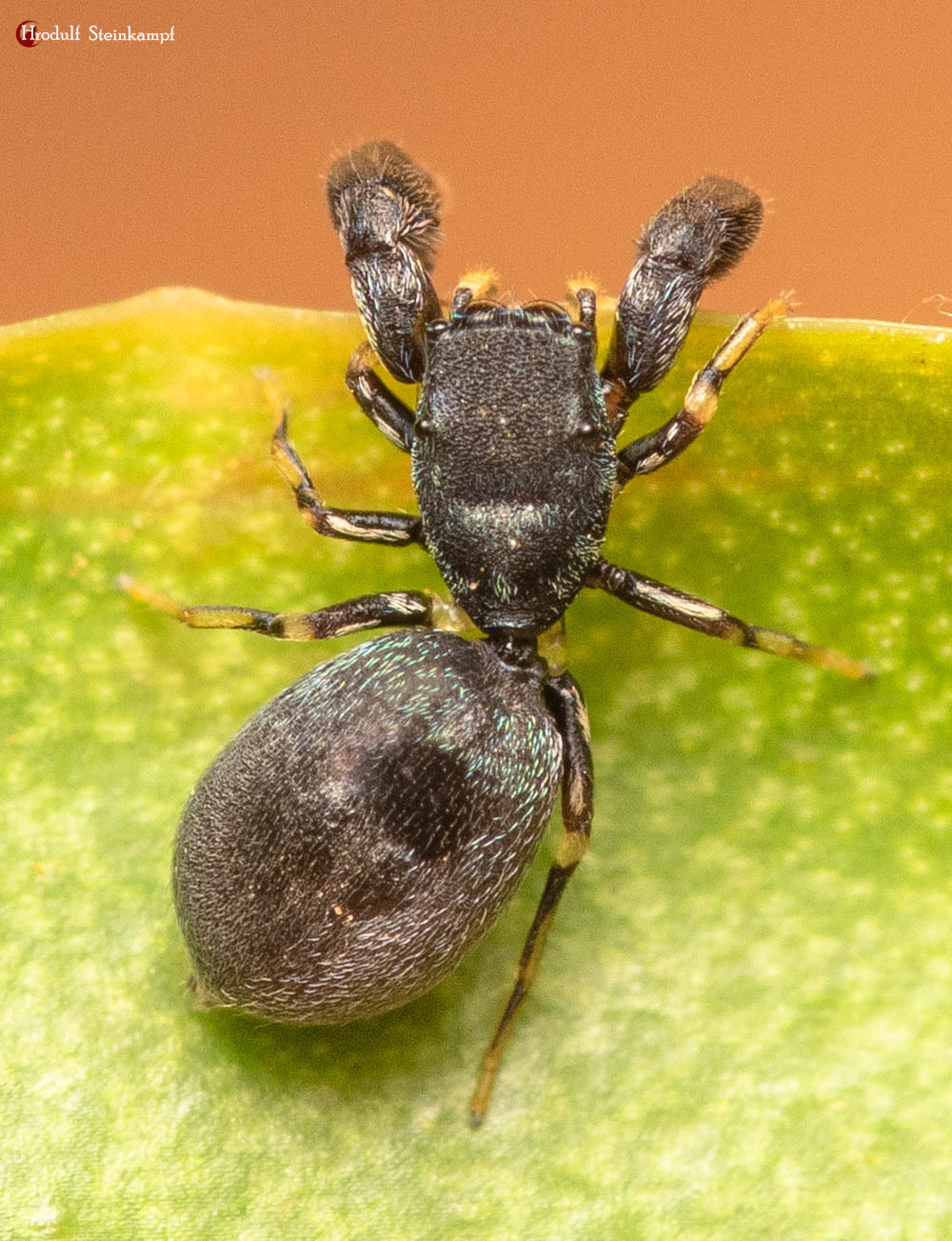
female

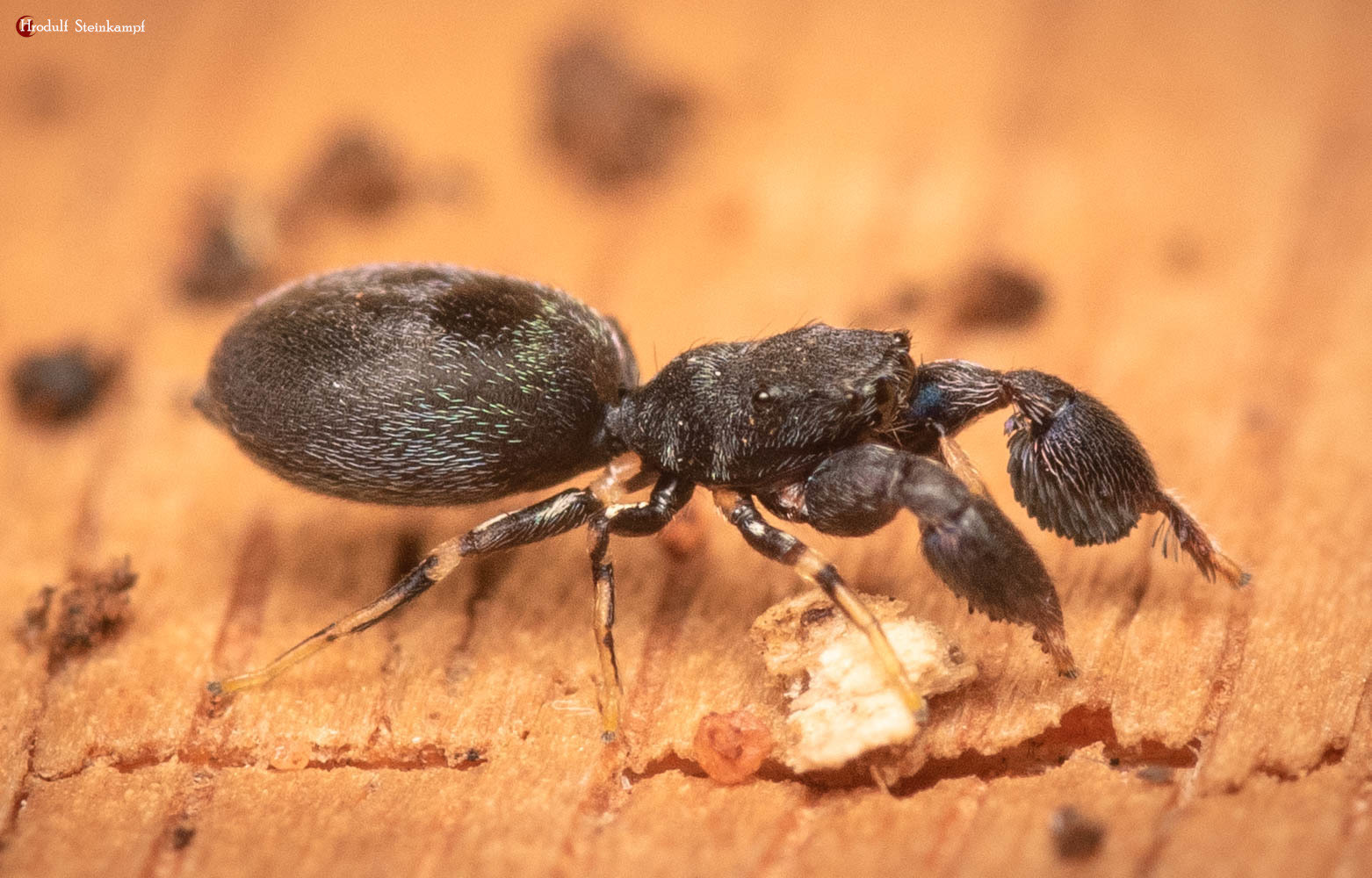
female

== Habitat and ecology ==
This rare species was collected by beating foliage and canopy fogging in some reserves in the Indian Ocean Coastal Belt and Savanna biomes at altitudes ranging from 5 to 496 m. Adults were also collected from beneath the bark of the fever tree (Vachellia xanthophloea), in one instance close to colonies of Crematogaster ants. Specimens were observed to flip backwards when handled.

== Conservation ==
Due to its wide geographical range, the species is listed as Least Concern. There are no known threats to the species and it is protected in Ndumo Game Reserve, Tembe Elephant Park, and Kosi Bay Nature Reserve.

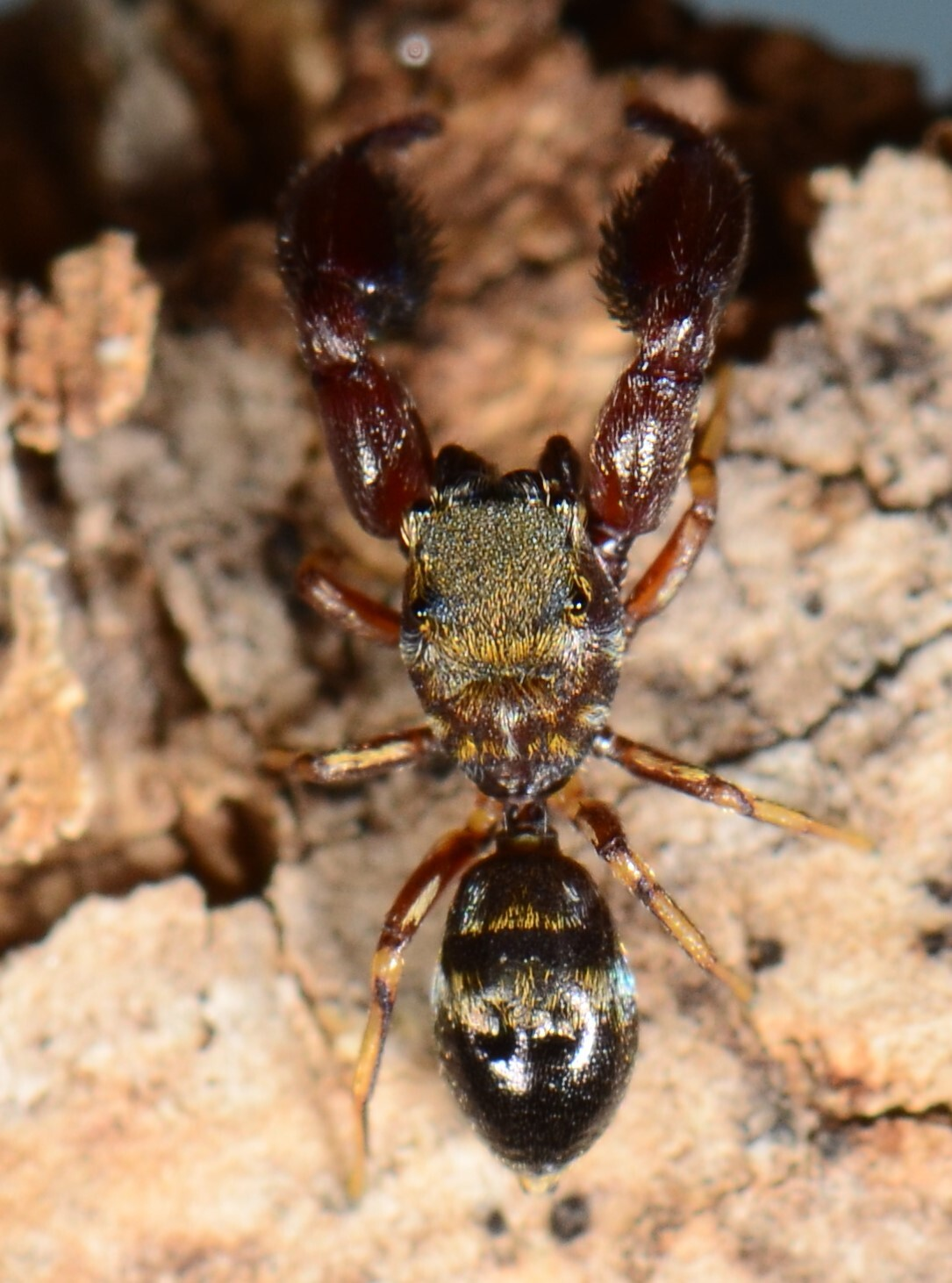
male

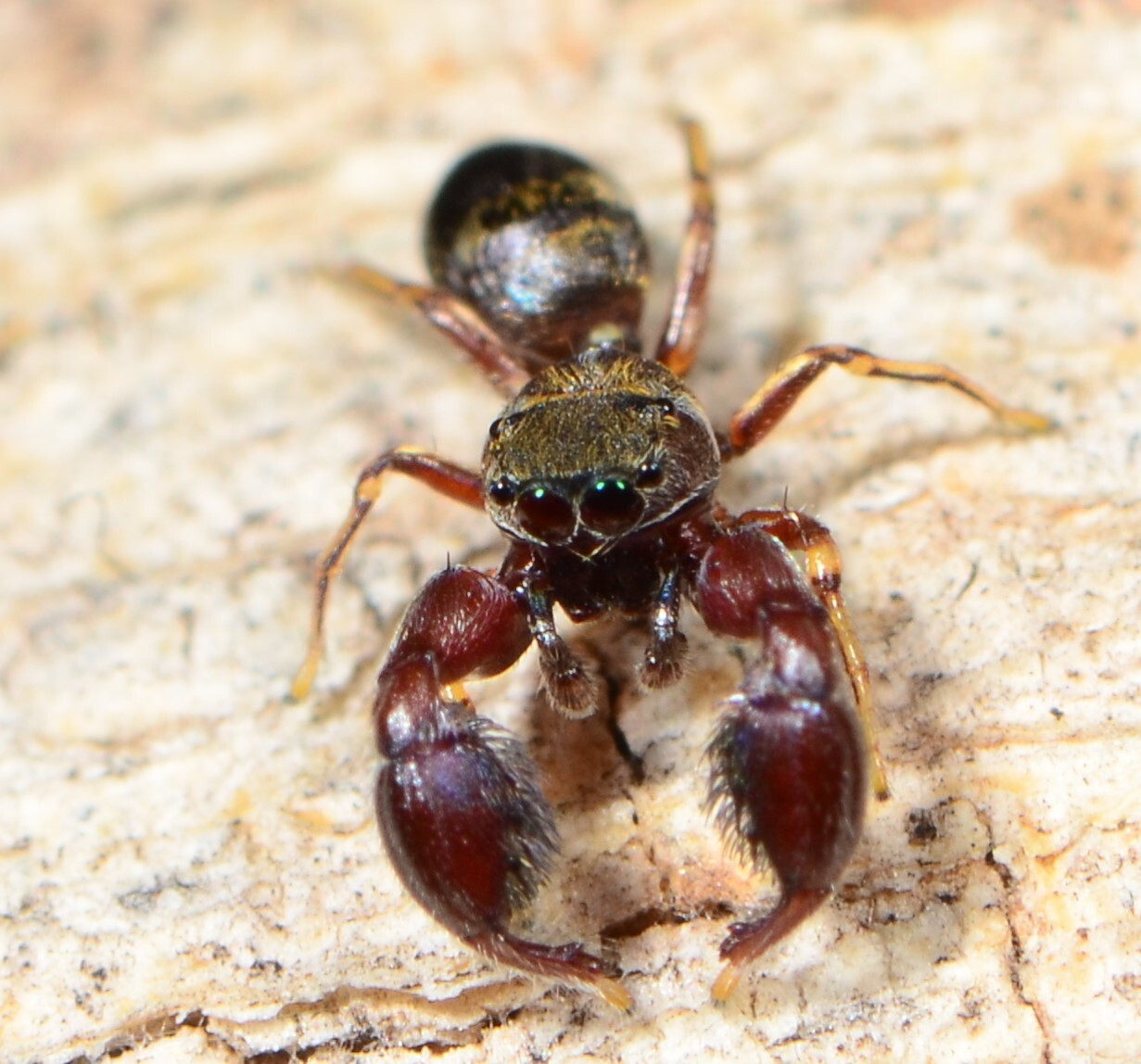
male

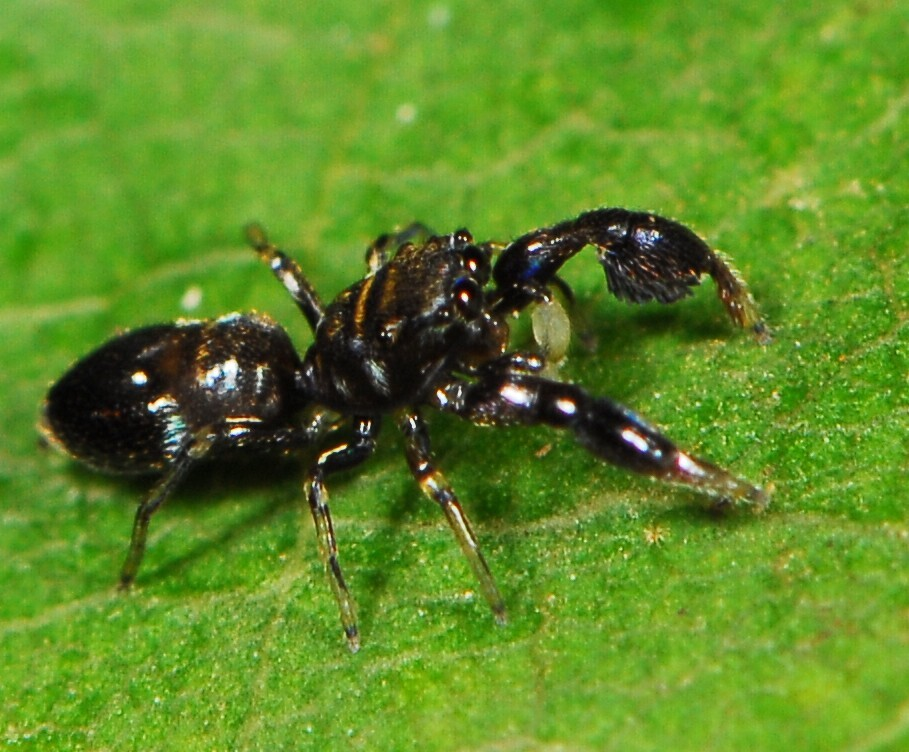
juvenile male

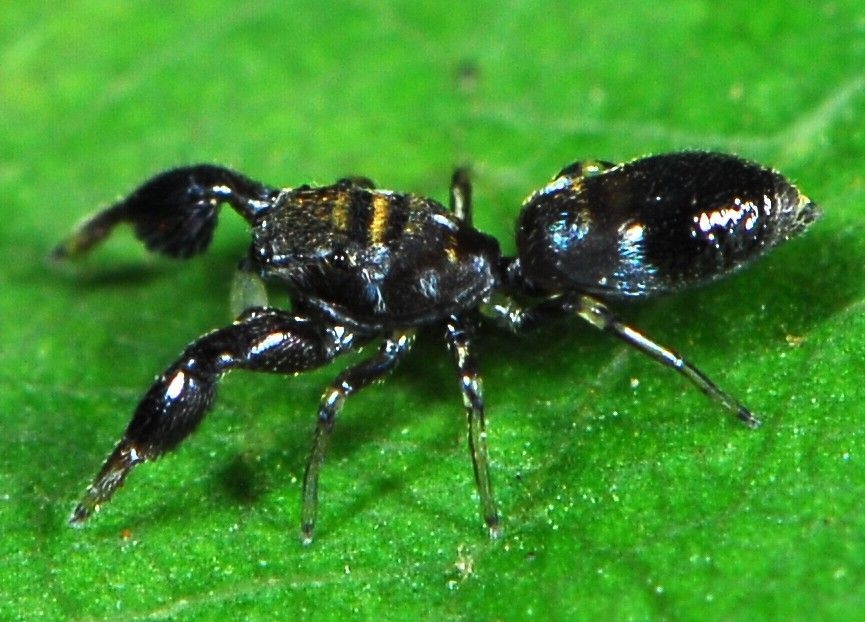
juvenile male

== Taxonomy ==
Afromarengo coriacea was originally described as Marengo coriacea by Eugène Simon in 1900 from South Africa, with the type locality given only as Natal. The species was transferred to Afromarengo by Benjamin in 2004 and has been redescribed by Dawidowicz and Wesołowska in 2016 and Azarkina and Haddad in 2020.
