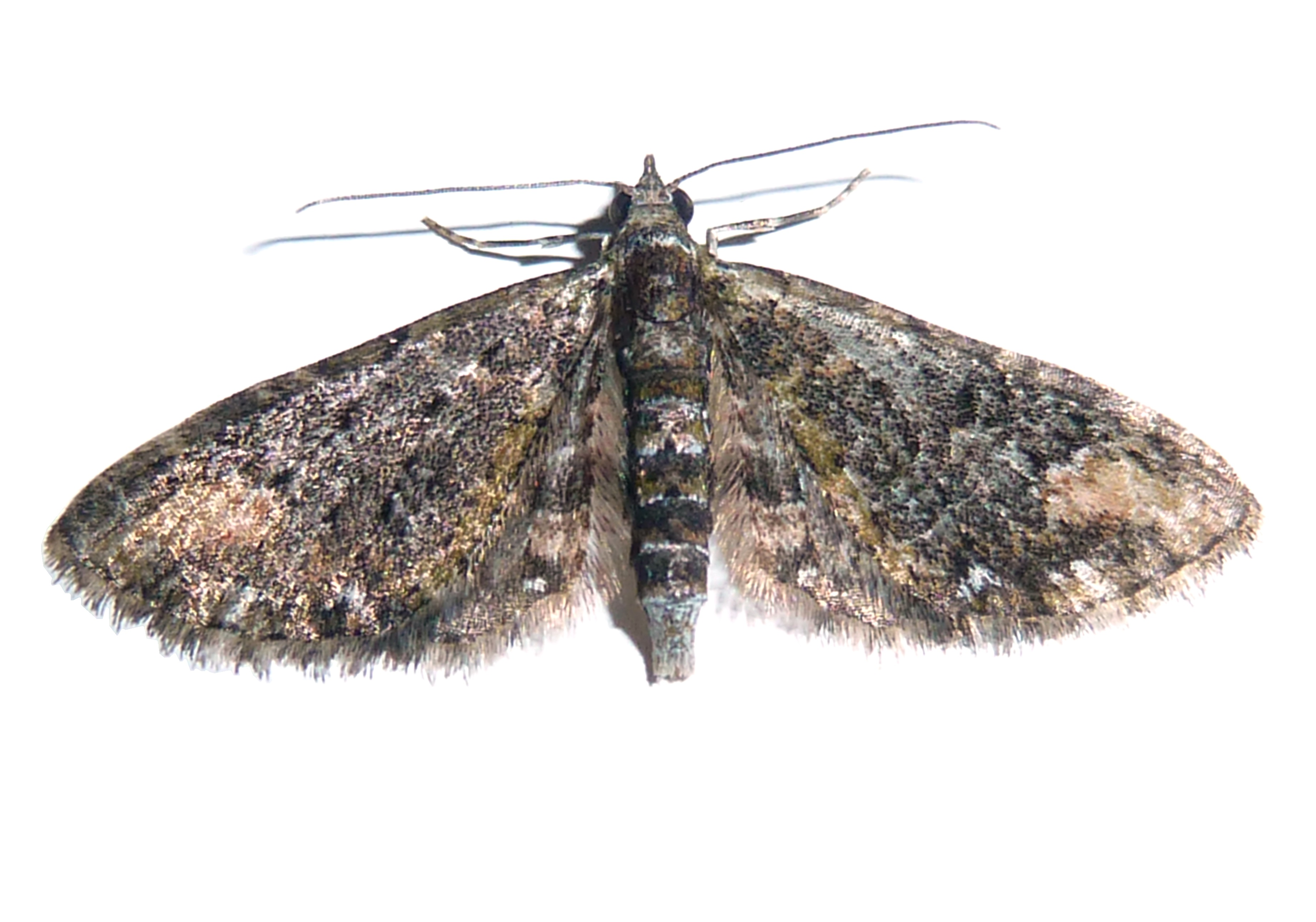

Scientific classification
- Kingdom: Animalia
- Phylum: Arthropoda
- Clade: Pancrustacea
- Class: Insecta
- Order: Lepidoptera
- Family: Geometridae
- Genus: Eupithecia
- Species: E. gradatilinea

Binomial name
- Eupithecia gradatilinea Prout L.B., 1916

Synonyms
- Eupithecia rubidimixta Prout, 1916

= Eupithecia gradatilinea =

Species of moth

Eupithecia gradatilinea is a moth in the family Geometridae. It is found in Equatorial Guinea (Bioko), Kenya, Malawi, South Africa, Zambia and Zimbabwe.

The larvae feed on Acacia xanthophloea.
