= Ligdus =

Scientific classification
- Kingdom: Animalia
- Phylum: Arthropoda
- Subphylum: Chelicerata
- Class: Arachnida
- Order: Araneae
- Infraorder: Araneomorphae
- Family: Salticidae
- Subfamily: Salticinae
- Genus: Ligdus; Thorell, 1895

Species
- 2, see text

Genus of spiders

Ligdus is a genus of jumping spiders found in Burma and India. It contains only two species, Ligdus chelifer and Ligdus garvale.

The species was described in 1896 from a single female specimen. Eugène Simon thought it to be close to Copocrossa. The habitus of an immature specimen, already showing the large spiny front legs, was drawn by Proszynski in 1984. It was thought to have only one species, until another species was found in India.

== Species ==
- L. chelifer Thorell, 1895 – India
- L. garvale Caleb, Shree, Kumar et Abhijith, 2024
