= Propiomarengo =

Scientific classification
- Kingdom: Animalia
- Phylum: Arthropoda
- Subphylum: Chelicerata
- Class: Arachnida
- Order: Araneae
- Infraorder: Araneomorphae
- Family: Salticidae
- Genus: Propiomarengo; Azarkina & Haddad, 2020

Type species
- Afromarengo plana (Haddad & Wesołowska, 2013)

Species
- Propiomarengo foordi Azarkina & Haddad, 2020; Propiomarengo plana (Haddad & Wesołowska, 2013)

Genus of jumping spiders

Propiomarengo is a small genus of South African jumping spiders that was first described by G. N. Azarkina and C. R. Haddad in 2020. The type species, Propiomarengo plana, was originally described under the name "Afromarengo plana", but was moved to a new genus in 2020 when a similar species was discovered in South Africa.

== Species ==
As of October 2025, this genus includes two species:

- Propiomarengo foordi Azarkina & Haddad, 2020 – South Africa
- Propiomarengo plana (Haddad & Wesołowska, 2013) – South Africa (type species)

== See also ==
- Afromarengo
- List of Salticidae genera
