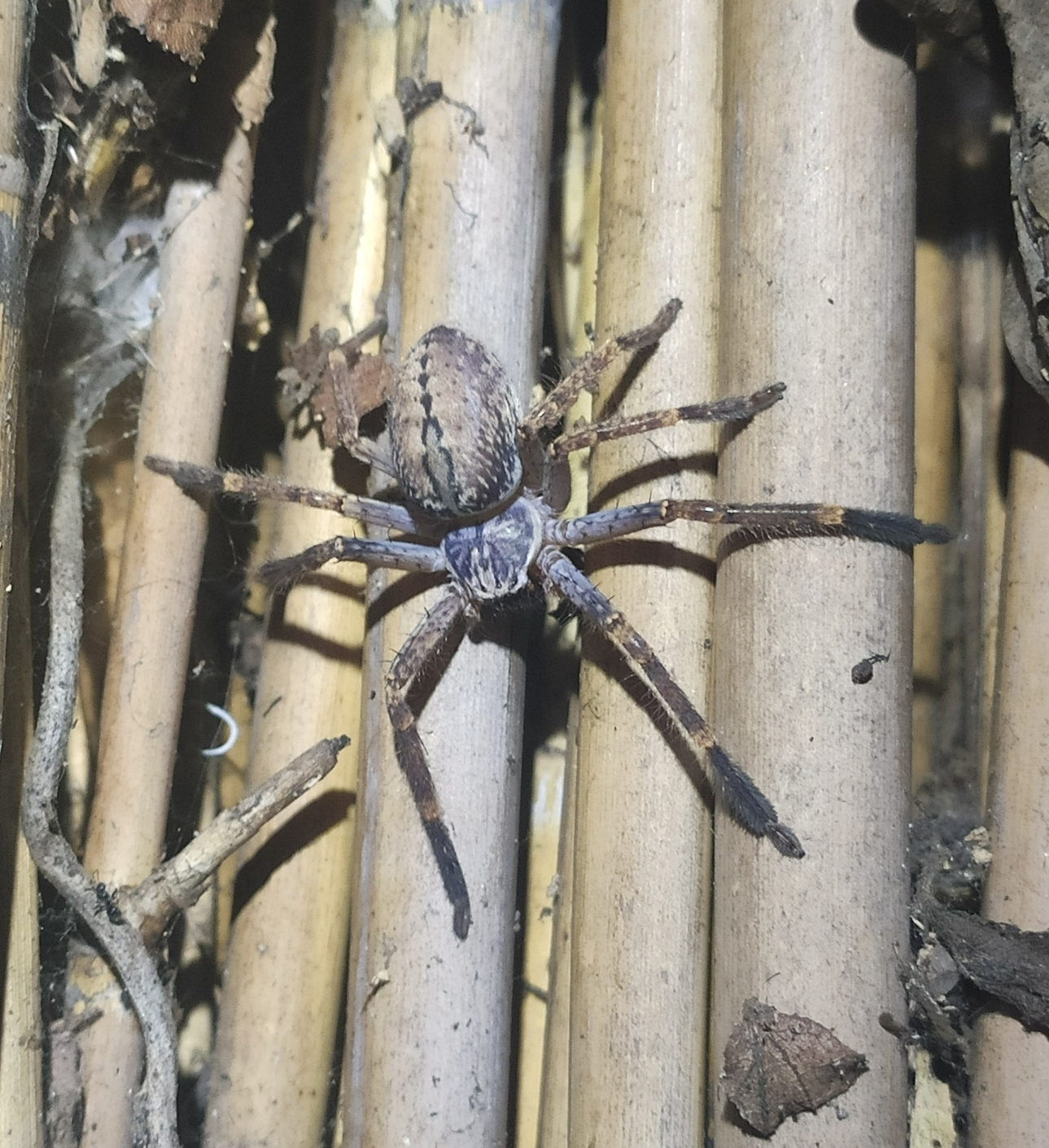

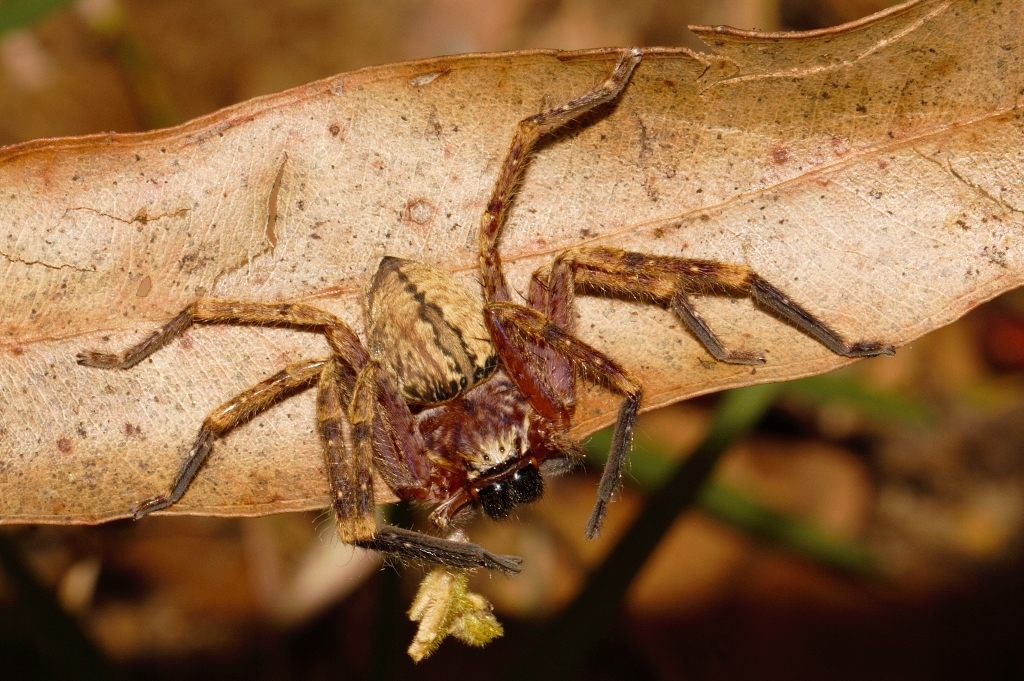

Scientific classification
- Kingdom: Animalia
- Phylum: Arthropoda
- Subphylum: Chelicerata
- Class: Arachnida
- Order: Araneae
- Infraorder: Araneomorphae
- Family: Sparassidae
- Genus: Olios
- Species: O. sjostedti

Binomial name
- Olios sjostedti Lessert, 1921

Synonyms
- Olios sjöstedti Lessert, 1921

= Olios sjostedti =

Sjostedt's Olios Huntsman Spider

Species of spider

Olios sjostedti is a species of spider in the family Sparassidae. It is found in Africa and is commonly known as Sjostedt's Olios huntsman spider.

== Distribution ==
Olios sjostedti is known from Tanzania, Botswana, and South Africa. In South Africa, it is recorded from four provinces, Gauteng, KwaZulu-Natal, Limpopo, and Mpumalanga at altitudes ranging from 31 to 1,341 m above sea level.

== Habitat and ecology ==
Olios sjostedti lives in forests and grassland. Specimens have been recorded behind bark of Acacia xanthophloea, in vegetation and under stones. The species has been sampled from the Forest, Savanna, and Grassland biomes. It has also been collected from macadamia orchards.

== Description ==
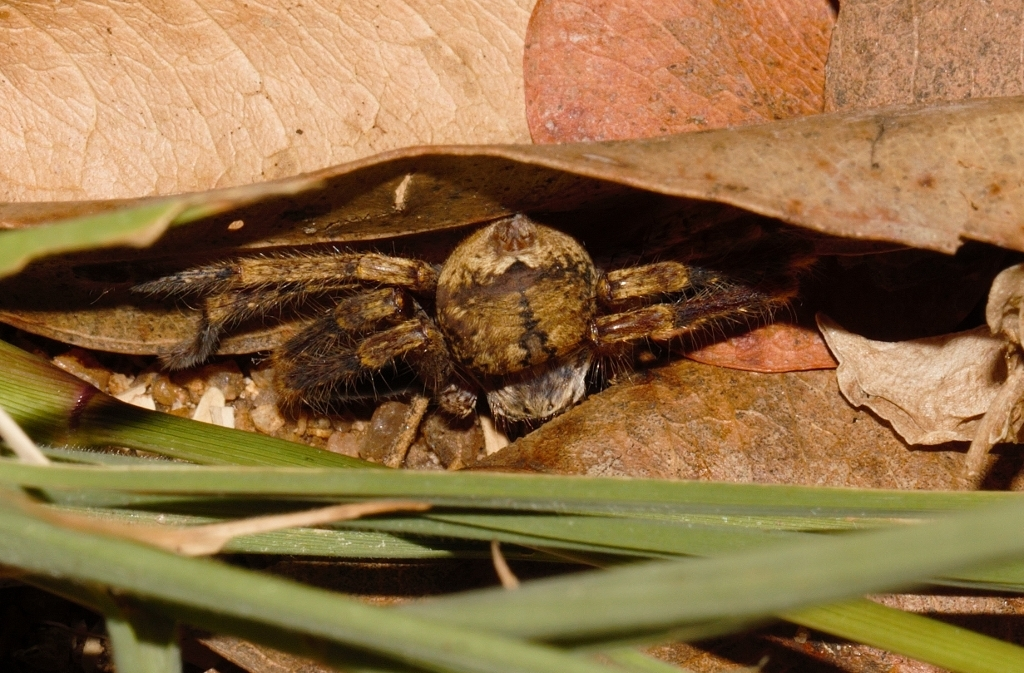
O. sjostedti in Zimbabwe

== Conservation ==
Olios sjostedti is listed as least concern by the South African National Biodiversity Institute due to its wide geographical range. In South Africa, the species is protected in four reserves including Ophathe Game Reserve, Ndumo Game Reserve, Luvhondo Nature Reserve, and Woodbush Forest Reserve.

== Etymology ==
The species is named in honor of Yngve Sjöstedt, a Swedish entomologist and explorer who collected extensively in Africa in the early 20th century.

== Taxonomy ==
Olios sjostedti was originally described by Lessert in 1921 from Tanzania. The species was recently redescribed by Jäger in 2014, who provided the first description of the female and recorded the species from South Africa and Botswana for the first time.
