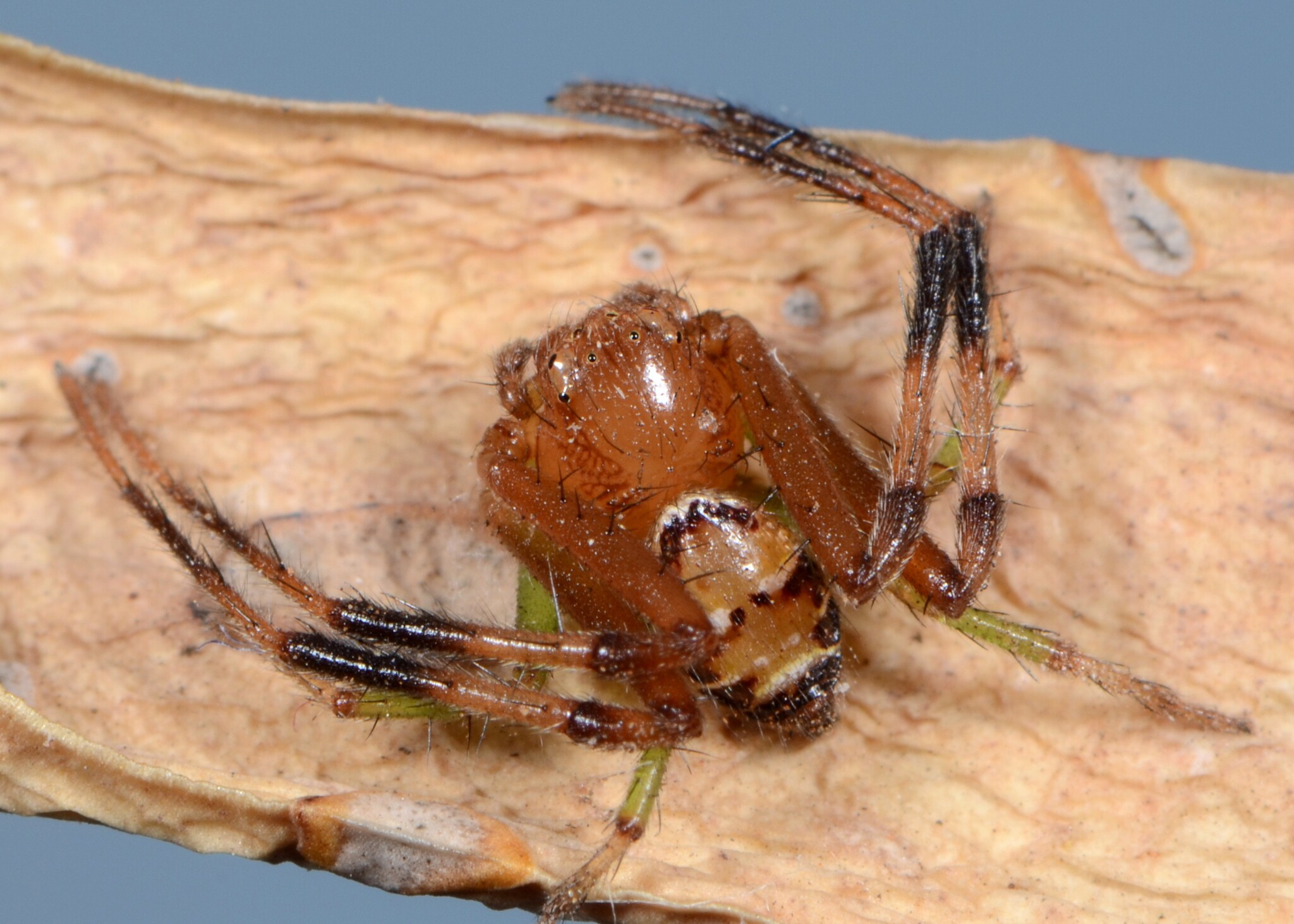
- male
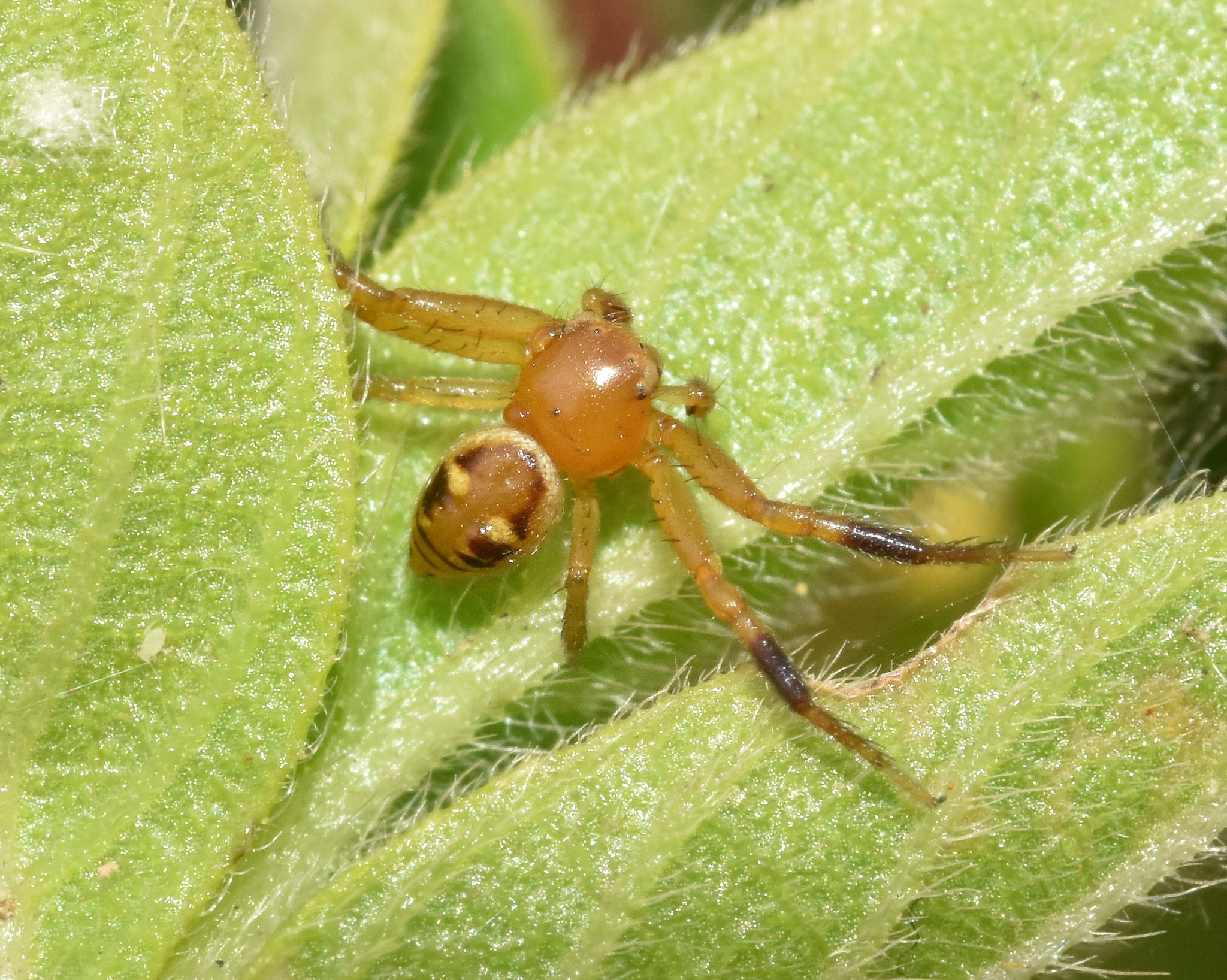
- male S. mandibulare from South Africa

Conservation status
- Least Concern (IUCN 3.1)

Scientific classification
- Kingdom: Animalia
- Phylum: Arthropoda
- Subphylum: Chelicerata
- Class: Arachnida
- Order: Araneae
- Infraorder: Araneomorphae
- Family: Thomisidae
- Genus: Synema
- Species: S. mandibulare

Binomial name
- Synema mandibulare Dahl, 1907

Synonyms
- Synaema (Baerella) mandibularis Dahl, 1907

= Synema mandibulare =

Orange African mask spider

Species of crab spider

Synema mandibulare is a species of crab spider of the genus Synema. It is native to Africa, where it has been recorded from Tanzania and South Africa. The species is also known as the orange African mask spider.

== Distribution ==
Synema mandibulare has been recorded from Tanzania and South Africa. In South Africa, the species has been documented from four provinces: Eastern Cape, KwaZulu-Natal, Mpumalanga, and Limpopo. Notable localities include Jeffrey's Bay, Addo Elephant National Park, Tembe Elephant Park, Ndumo Game Reserve, and various nature reserves in Limpopo province.

== Habitat ==
Synema mandibulare is a free-living species found on plants and occasionally inside flower corollas. It has been collected from the Fynbos, Savanna, and Thicket biomes. The species has also been found associated with the bark of Vachellia xanthophloea (fever tree).

The species occurs at elevations ranging from 16 to 1,407 meters above sea level.

== Description ==
As a member of the family Thomisidae, Synema mandibulare exhibits the typical crab spider body plan with a flattened cephalothorax and opisthosoma. The species displays sexual dimorphism common among crab spiders. Females have been collected, but not formally described.

== Conservation ==
Synema mandibulare is classified as Least Concern due to its wide geographical range within Africa. The species has been recorded in several protected areas including Addo Elephant National Park, Tembe Elephant Park, Ndumo Game Reserve, and Lekgalameetse Nature Reserve. No known threats have been identified, and no specific conservation actions are currently recommended.
