= Propiomarengo plana =

Scientific classification
- Kingdom: Animalia
- Phylum: Arthropoda
- Subphylum: Chelicerata
- Class: Arachnida
- Order: Araneae
- Infraorder: Araneomorphae
- Family: Salticidae
- Genus: Propiomarengo
- Species: P. plana

Binomial name
- Propiomarengo plana (Haddad & Wesołowska, 2013)

Species of spider

Propiomarengo plana is a species of jumping spider in the genus Propiomarengo that lives in South Africa. Originally named Afromarengo plana when first described in 2013, the species was renamed 7 years later and made the type species of the new genus. The spider is small, with a grey-beige abdomen that is between 2.4 and 2.8 centimetres (0.94 and 1.10 in) in length and a brown carapace that is slightly smaller. Only the female has been described, which has a distinctive epigyne with two depressions flanking a ridge. It has only been found in Free State.

== Taxonomy and etymology ==
Propiomarengo plana is a species of jumping spider. First described by Charles Haddad and Wanda Wesołowska in 2013, the spider was allocated to the genus Afromarengo. The genus name derived from the root Afro, meaning from Africa, and the genus name Marengo. It was the third species to be added to the genus. In 2020, the species was transferred to the new genus Propiomarengo by Galina Azarkina working with Charles Haddad. The name has a similar construction, once again recalling Marengo, but with a prefix recalling the Latin word for similar, propior. It was made the type species of the genus. The species name is derived from the Latin word for flat.

== Description ==
Only the female has been described. It is small, with a brown carapace and a grey-beige oval abdomen that is covered in small brown hairs. The epigyne is distinctive and has a narrow ridge that is flanked by two large depressions shaped like beans. The cephalothorax has a length that ranges between 1.7 and 1.8 centimetres (0.67 and 0.71 in), while the abdomen measures between 2.4 and 2.8 centimetres (0.94 and 1.10 in) long. It differs from other members of the genus in the shape of the carapace, which is more rounded when viewed from the side.

== Distribution and habitat ==
The spider has only been found in South Africa and has a limited range. The holotype was found at the Tussen-die-Riviere Nature Reserve in Free State. It was first seen near to the river, in bushes on the edge of grassland. It has also been seen in nearby farmland.
