= Indomarengo =

Scientific classification
- Kingdom: Animalia
- Phylum: Arthropoda
- Subphylum: Chelicerata
- Class: Arachnida
- Order: Araneae
- Infraorder: Araneomorphae
- Family: Salticidae
- Subfamily: Salticinae
- Genus: Indomarengo; Benjamin, 2004

Type species
- Indomarengo sarawakensis Benjamin, 2004

Species
- See text.

Genus of spiders

Indomarengo is a genus of the spider family Salticidae (jumping spiders).

== Name ==
The genus name is combined from India and the salticid genus Marengo. (See also Afromarengo.)

== Species ==
As of March 2022, the World Spider Catalog accepted the following species:

- Indomarengo chandra Benjamin, 2004 – Sumatra
- Indomarengo chavarapater Malamel, Prajapati, Sudhikumar & Sebastian, 2019 – India
- Indomarengo sarawakensis Benjamin, 2004 – Java, Borneo
- Indomarengo thomsoni (Wanless, 1978) – Borneo
- Indomarengo yui Wang & Li, 2020 – China
