= Copocrossa =

Scientific classification
- Kingdom: Animalia
- Phylum: Arthropoda
- Subphylum: Chelicerata
- Class: Arachnida
- Order: Araneae
- Infraorder: Araneomorphae
- Family: Salticidae
- Subfamily: Salticinae
- Genus: Copocrossa; Simon, 1901

Type species
- C. tenuilineata (Simon, 1900)

Species
- 4, see text

Genus of spiders

Copocrossa is a genus of jumping spiders that was first described by Eugène Louis Simon in 1901.

== Species ==
As of June 2019 it contains four species, found in Indonesia, Kenya, Malaysia, and Queensland:

- Copocrossa albozonata Caporiacco, 1949 – Kenya
- Copocrossa harpina Simon, 1903 – Indonesia (Sumatra)
- Copocrossa politiventris Simon, 1901 – Malaysia
- Copocrossa tenuilineata (Simon, 1900) (type) – Australia (Queensland)
