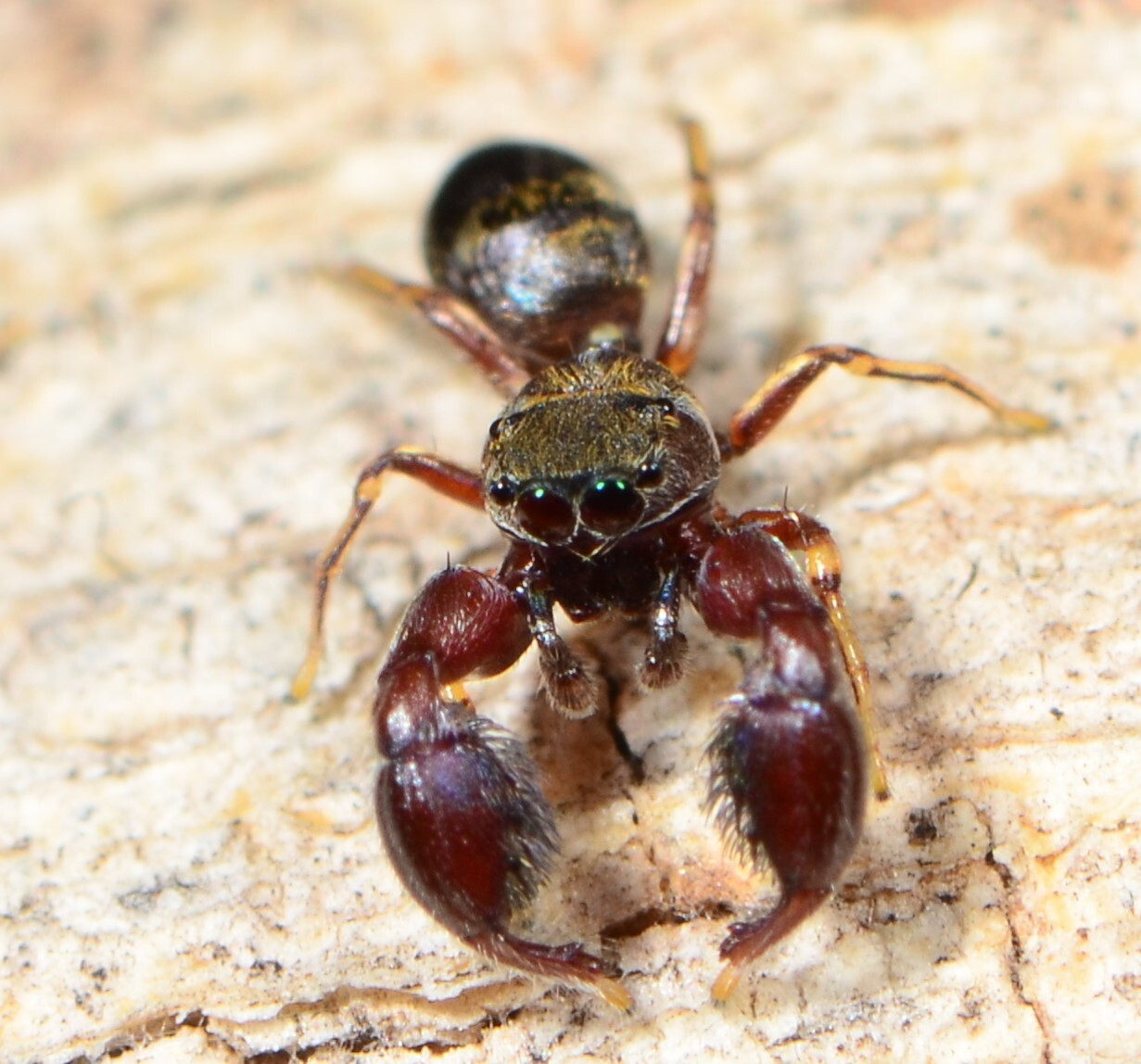
- Male A. coriacea from South Africa
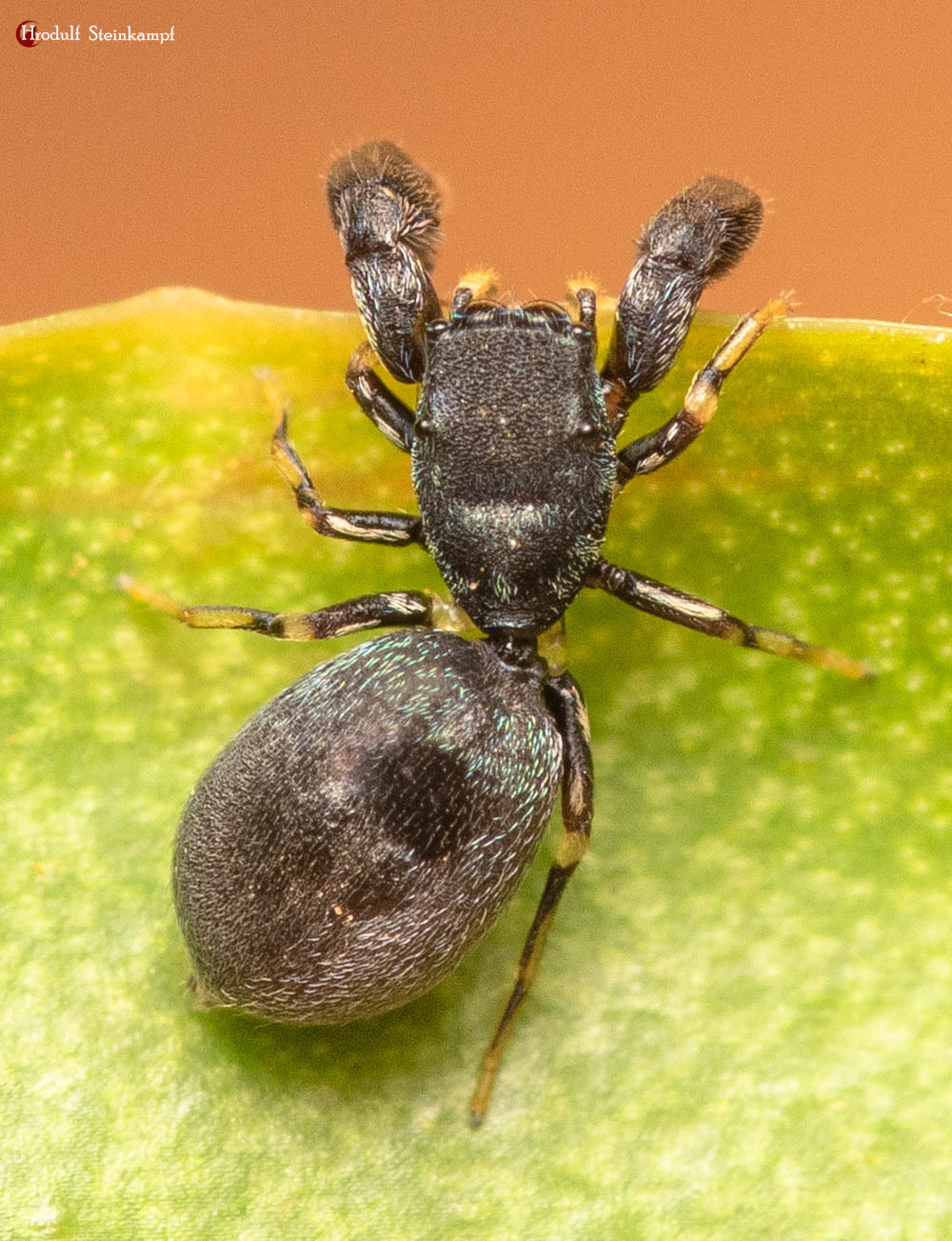
- Female A. coriacea

Scientific classification
- Kingdom: Animalia
- Phylum: Arthropoda
- Subphylum: Chelicerata
- Class: Arachnida
- Order: Araneae
- Infraorder: Araneomorphae
- Family: Salticidae
- Subfamily: Salticinae
- Genus: Afromarengo; Benjamin, 2004

Type species
- A. coriacea (Simon, 1900)

Species
- 4, see text

= Afromarengo =

Genus of spiders

Afromarengo is a genus of jumping spiders, was first described by S. P. Benjamin in 2004. The name is derived from "Africa" and the genus Marengo. The genus Indomarengo is similarly named.

== Life style ==
Spiders in this genus are arboreal, sampled from low-growing shrub foliage to tree canopies and occasionally from tree bark.

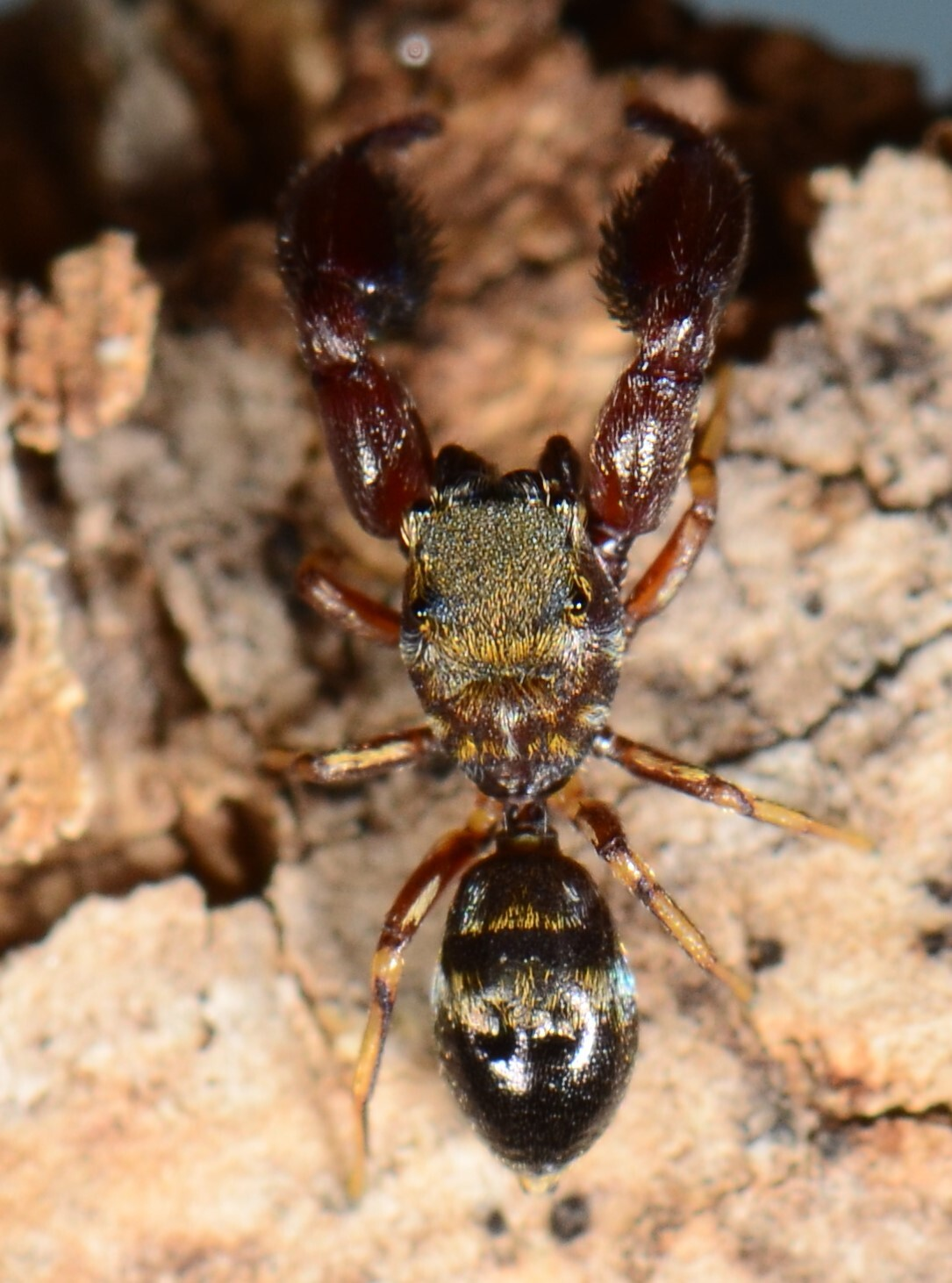
male A. coriacea

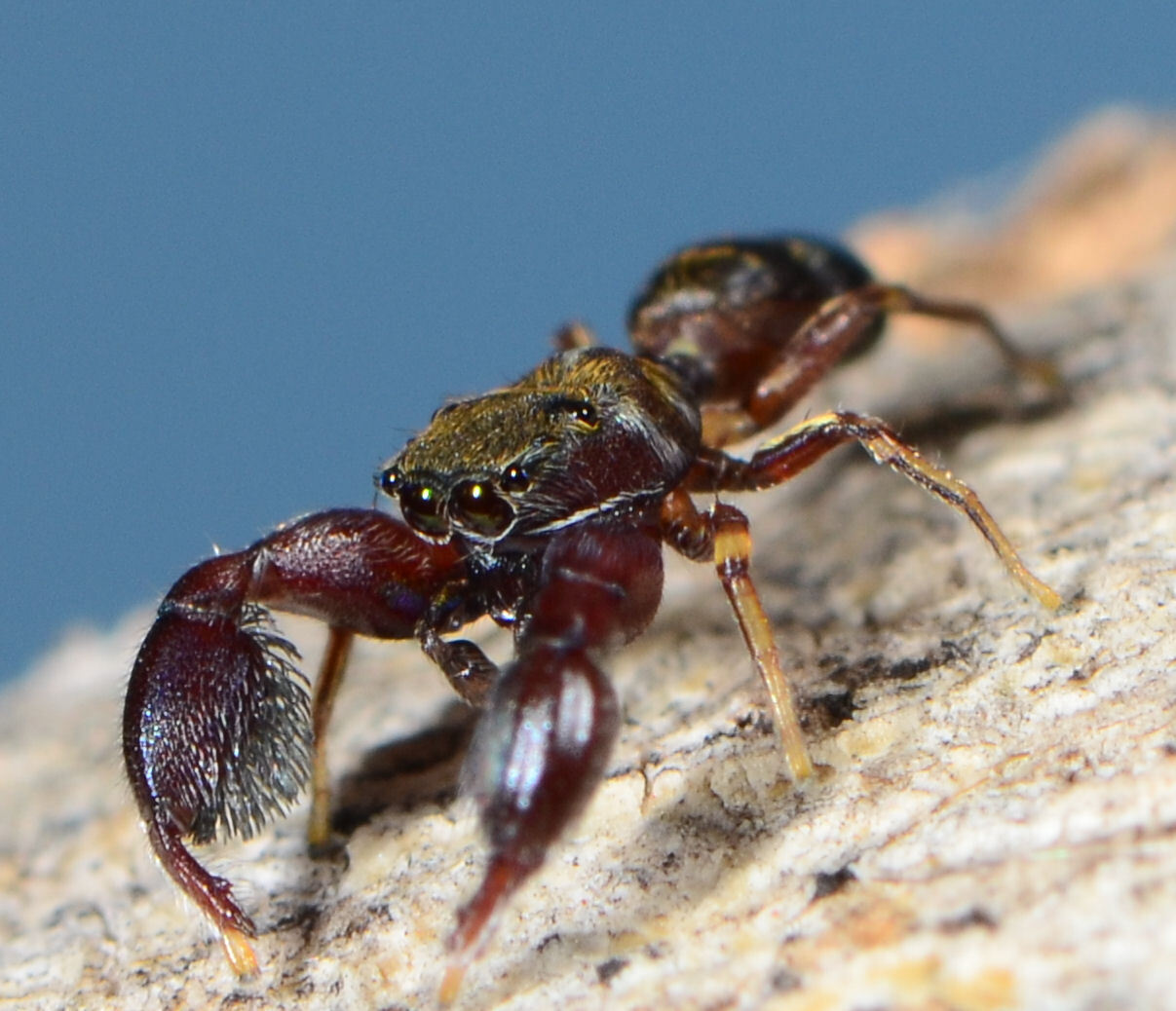
male A. coriacea

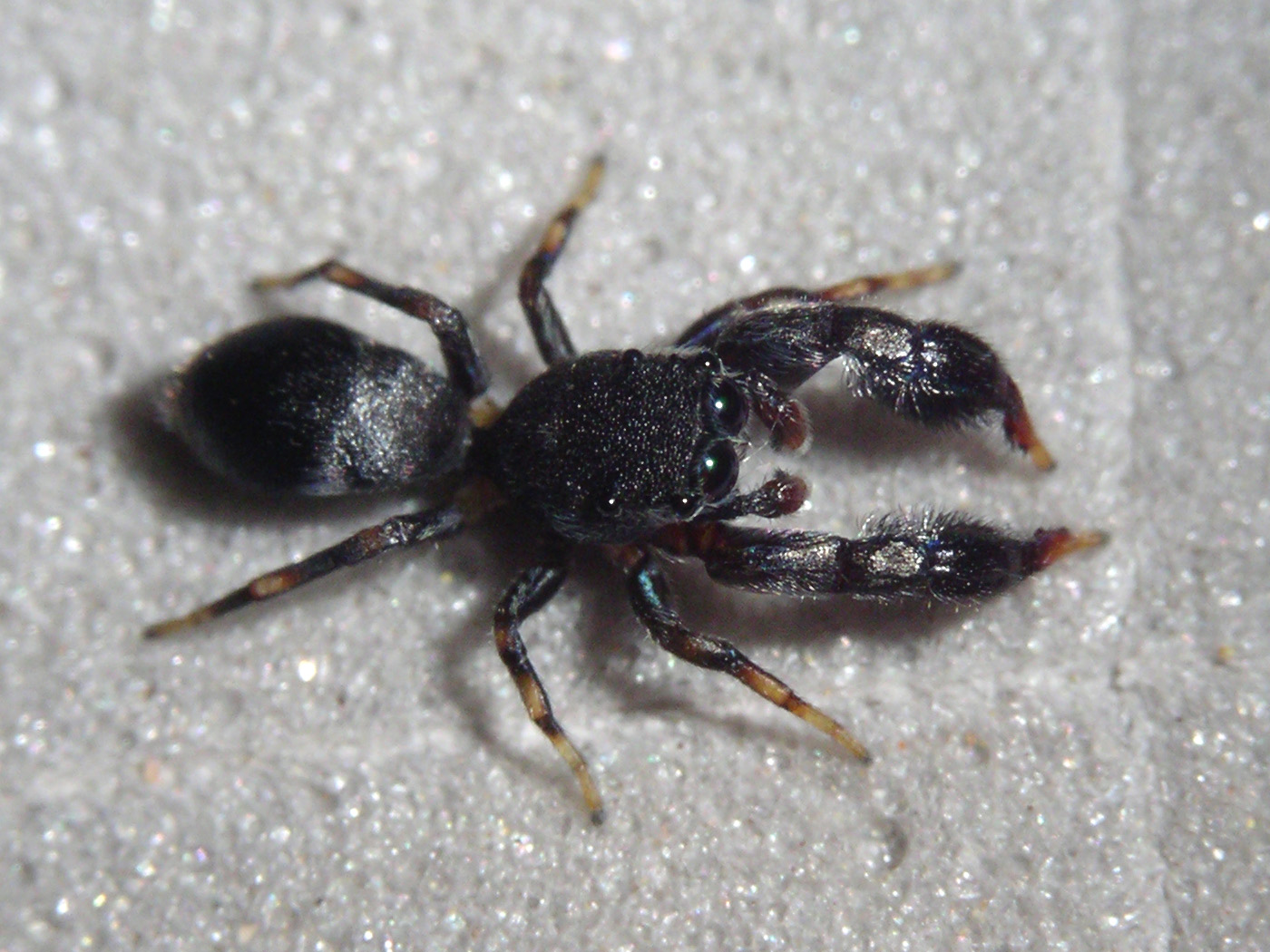
male Afromarengo sp. in Gabon

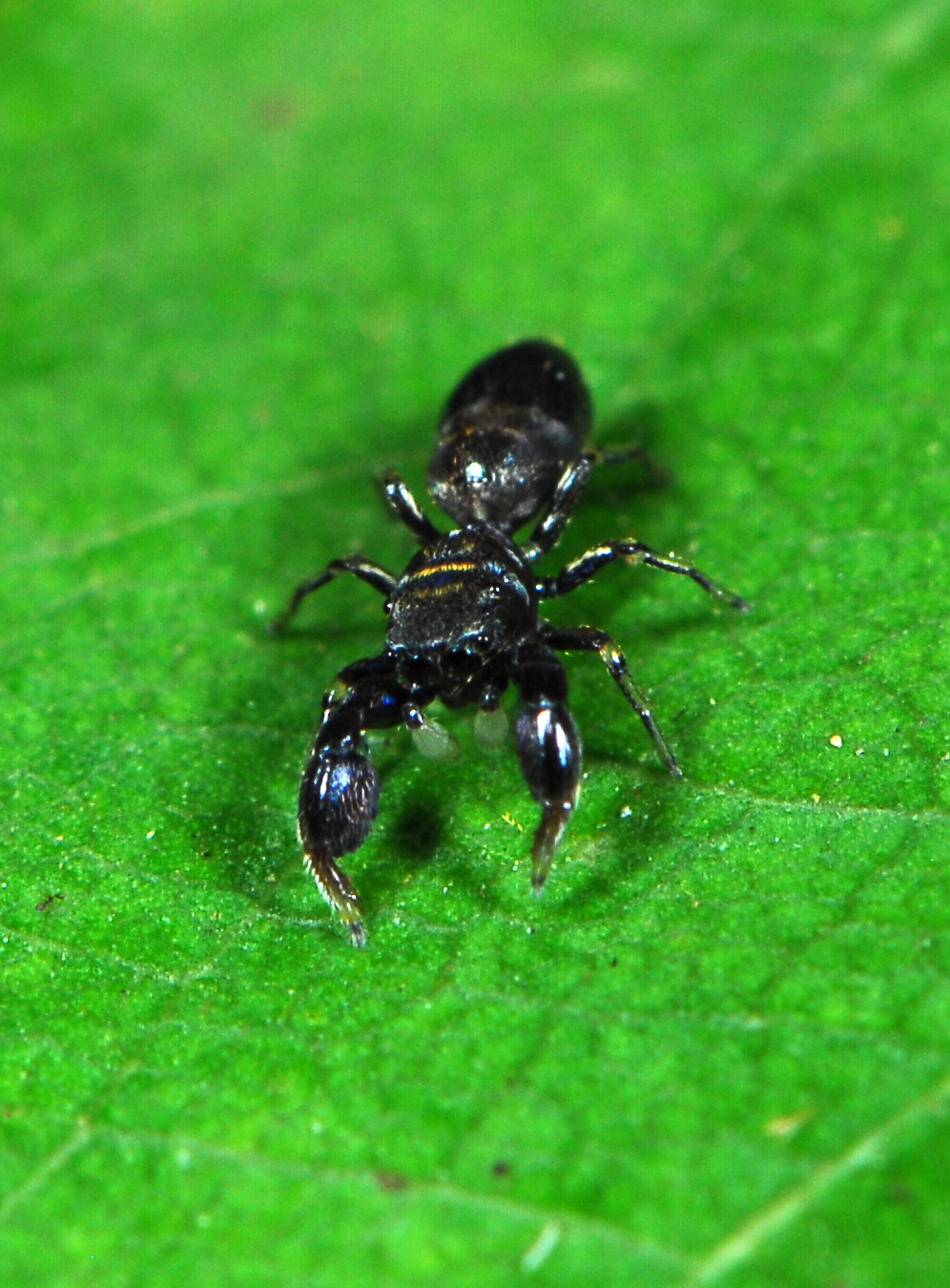
juvenile male A. coriacea

Wanless mentioned that it mimics ants or pseudoscorpions. Afromarengo coriacea mimics smaller arboreal ants such as Crematogaster, with which they were regularly collected.

== Description ==
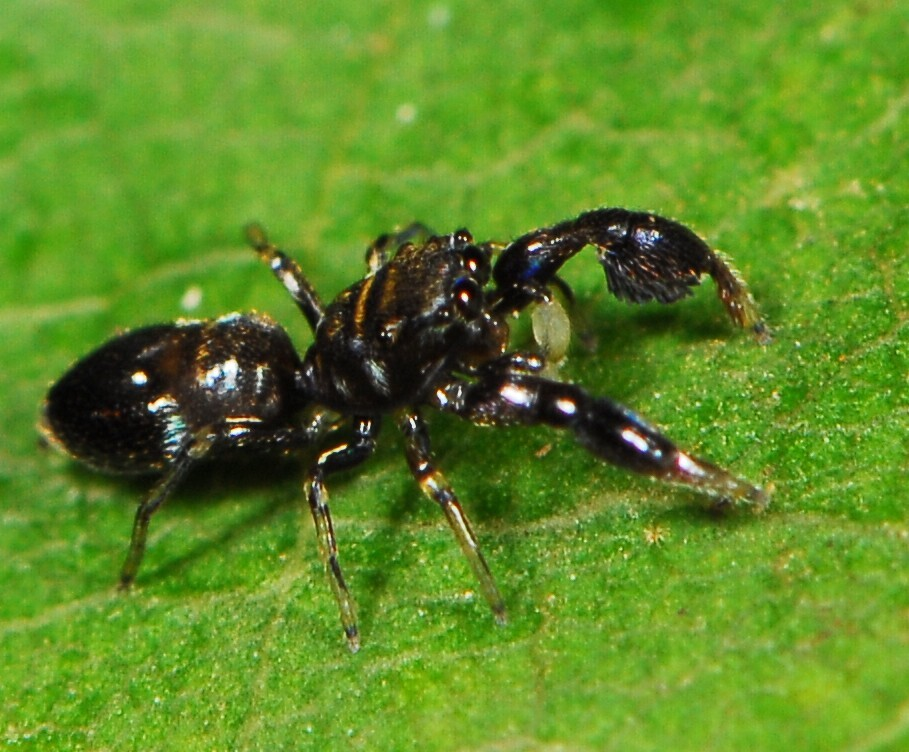
Juvenile male A. coriacea

These are small to medium spiders measuring 2.7 to 4.0 mm in males and 2.6 to 3.5 mm in females. Sexes are similar in general body shape.

Afromarengo can be distinguished from all other Ballinae by the asymmetrical scales on the body.

The cephalothorax is somewhat flattened and elongate-oval, truncated at the front and round at the rear, with integument bearing small papillae and larger piliferous papillae, numerous in the ocular area and fewer in the thoracic area. The abdomen is ovoid, with a dorsal scutum in males.

The front legs are long and more robust than the others, with the front leg's femur, patella and tibia swollen and clothed with dense, long setae ventrally.

The pedipalp bears a long spiraling embolus, and the epigyne has a distinct posterior border, scattered papillae, and absence of a median septum.

== Species ==
As of October 2025, this genus includes four species:

- Afromarengo coriacea (Simon, 1900) – Guinea, Ivory Coast, DR Congo, Kenya, Tanzania, Mozambique, South Africa (type species)
- Afromarengo ghanaensis Azarkina & Haddad, 2020 – Ghana
- Afromarengo lyrifera (Wanless, 1978) – Angola, Tanzania
- Afromarengo ugandensis Azarkina & Haddad, 2020 – DR Congo, Uganda
