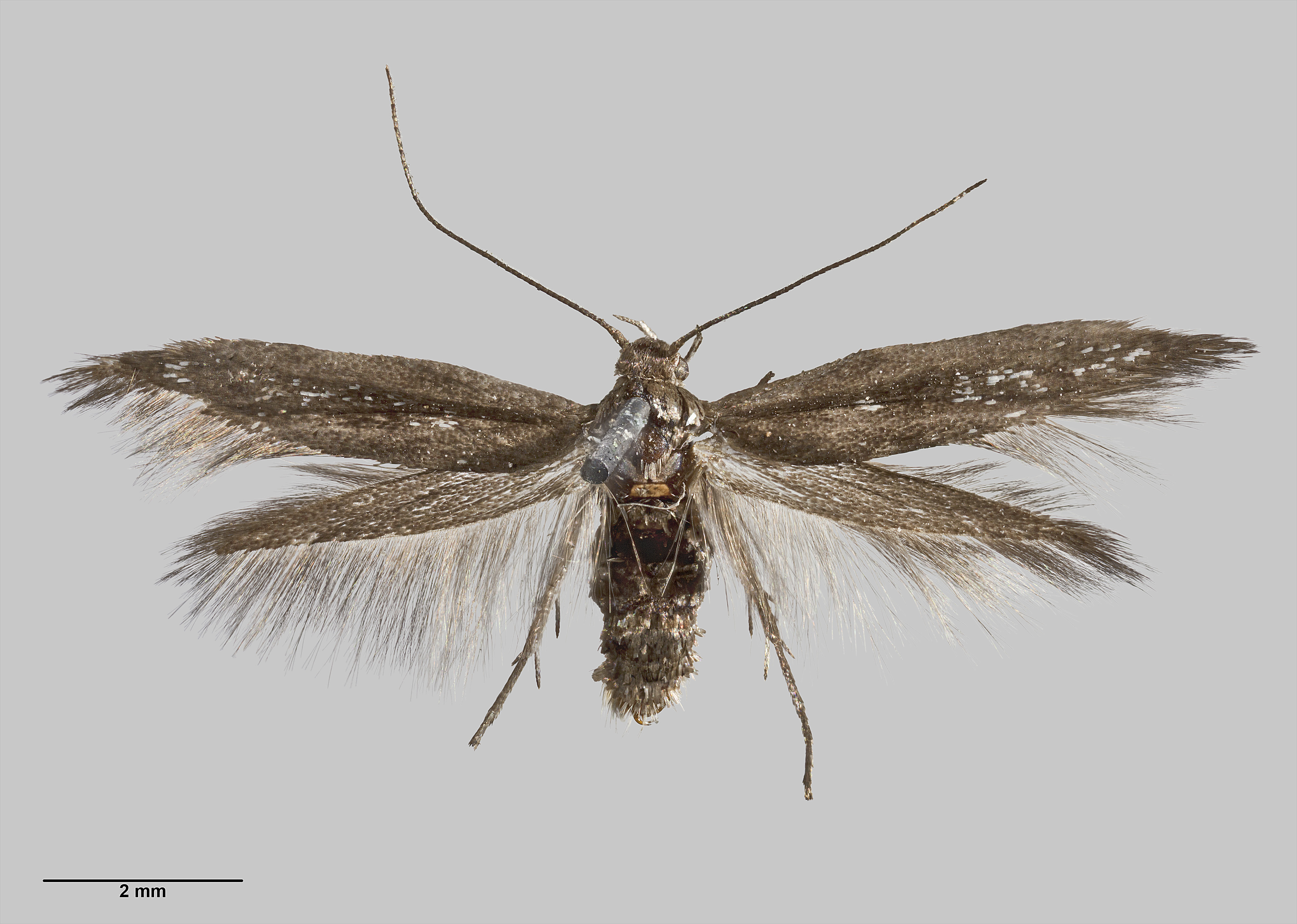
- Male holotype

Scientific classification
- Kingdom: Animalia
- Phylum: Arthropoda
- Class: Insecta
- Order: Lepidoptera
- Family: Scythrididae
- Genus: Scythris
- Species: S. nigra

Binomial name
- Scythris nigra Philpott, 1931

= Scythris nigra =

Species of moth endemic to New Zealand

Scythris nigra is a species of moth in the family Scythrididae first described by Alfred Philpott in 1931. It is endemic to New Zealand. The larvae of this species feeds on Hebe odora. The adults are day flying and on the wing in December.

== Taxonomy ==
This species was first described by Alfred Philpott in 1931 using specimens collected on Maungatua in December by C. E. Clarke. The male holotype specimen is held at the Auckland War Memorial Museum.

== Description ==
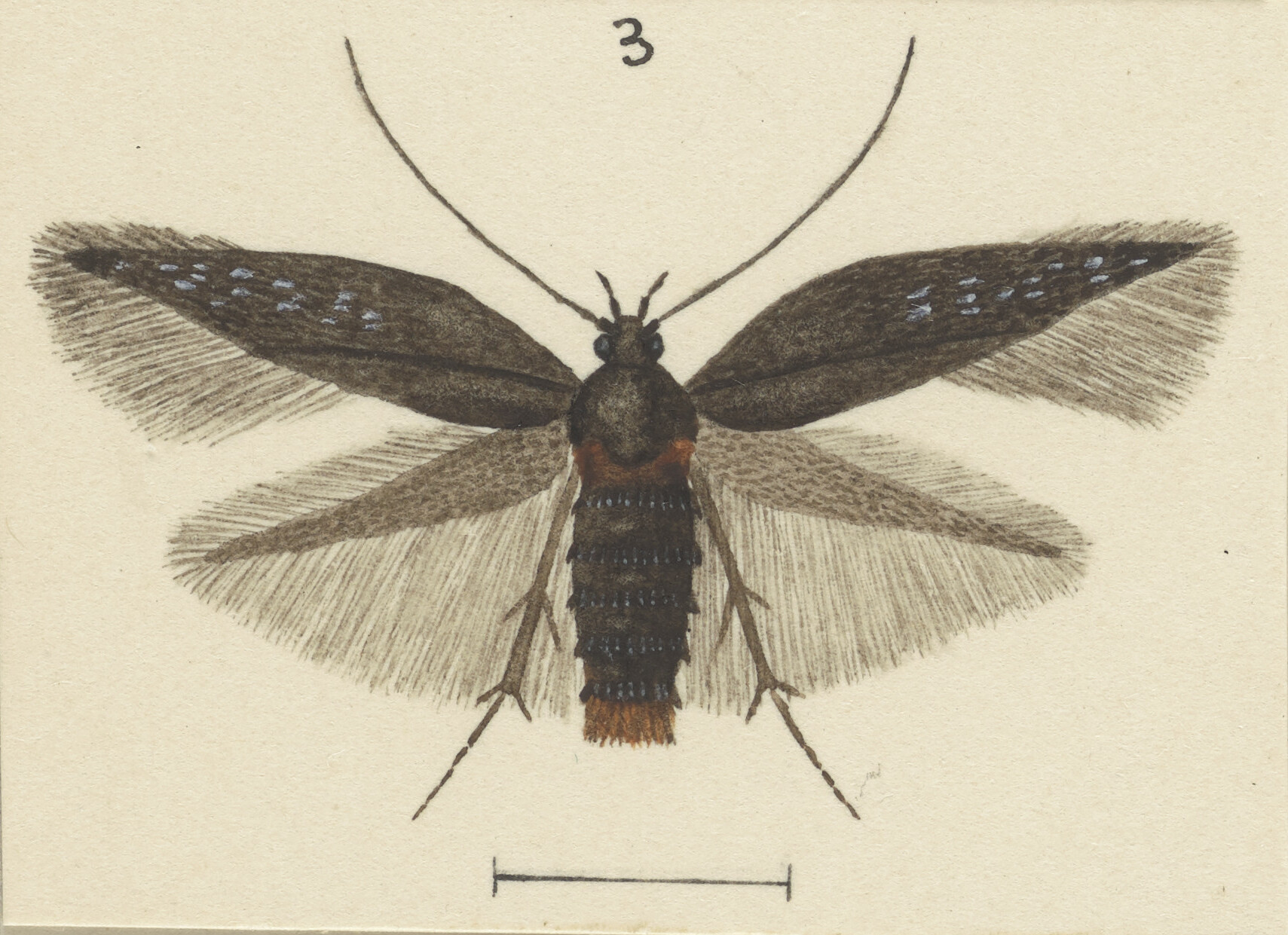
Illustration of S. nigra.

Philpott described this species as follows:

♂. 12 mm. Head, palpi, abdomen and thorax dark purplish fuscous. Antennae purplish fuscous, ciliations in ♂ ½. Legs dark purplish fuscous, tarsi without annulations. Forewings with costa moderately arched, bent at ⅓, apex acute, termen extremely oblique; dark purplish fuscous sparsely sprinkled with white scales: fringes dark fuscous. Hindwings and fringes dark fuscous.

This species can be distinguished from the similar appearing S. triatma as it has a much darker appearance and lacks the bluish-slate colour that can be seen on the fore-wings of S. triatma.

== Distribution ==
This species is endemic to New Zealand and has been observed in the lower parts of the South Island.

== Behaviour ==
The adults of this species are day flying and on the wing in December.

== Habitat and hosts ==
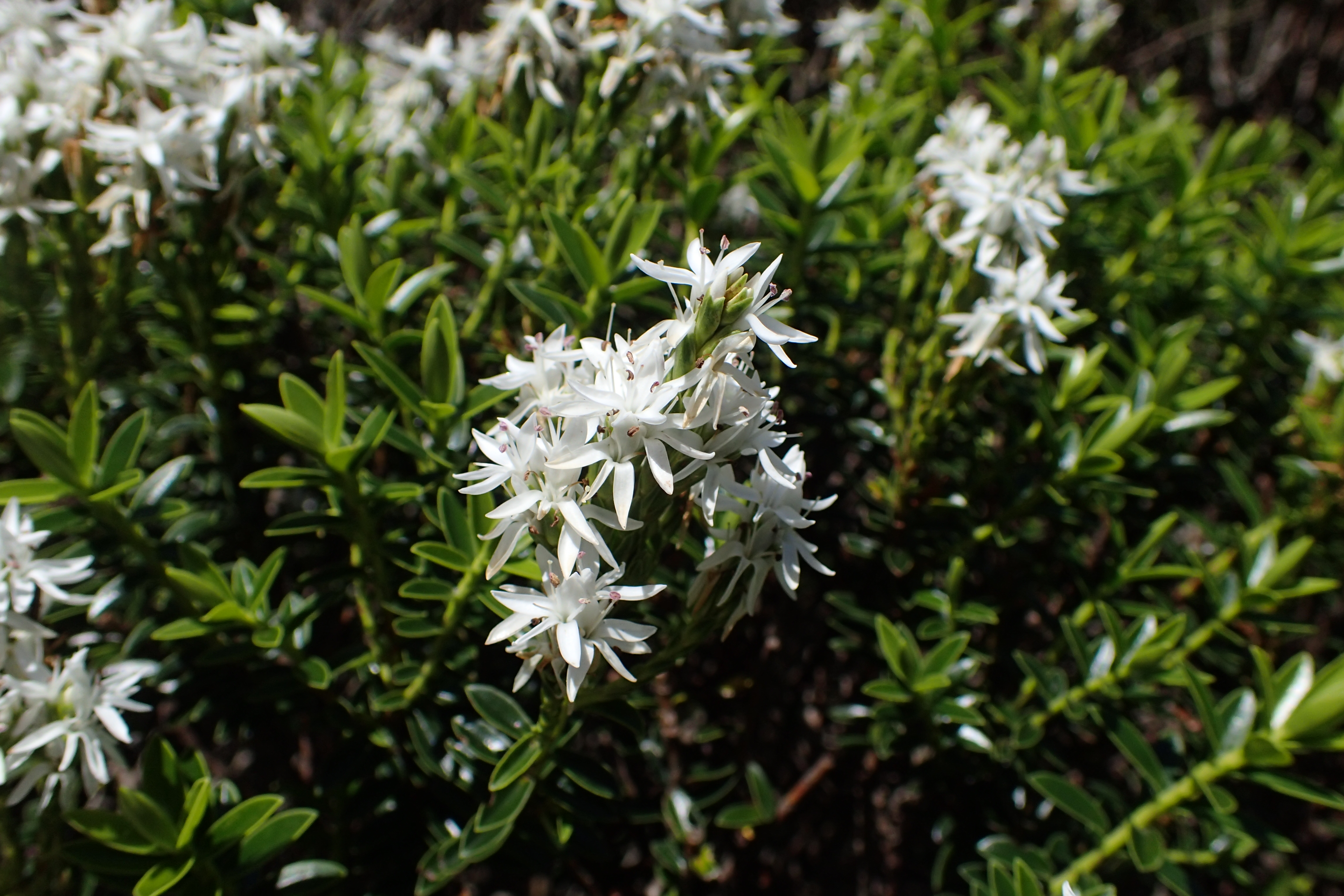
Larval host plant Hebe odora.

S. nigra normally lives in alpine habitats however it can be also found at relatively low altitudes such as at Waitahuna Hill near Lake Mahinerangi. The larvae of this species feed on Hebe odora.
