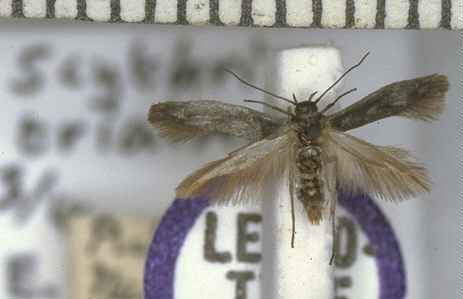
- Lectotype

Scientific classification
- Kingdom: Animalia
- Phylum: Arthropoda
- Class: Insecta
- Order: Lepidoptera
- Family: Scythrididae
- Genus: Scythris
- Species: S. triatma

Binomial name
- Scythris triatma Meyrick, 1935

= Scythris triatma =

Species of moth endemic to New Zealand

Scythris triatma is a species of moth in the family Scythrididae first described by Edward Meyrick in 1935. It is endemic to New Zealand and has been recorded in the South Island. Adults are day flying and are on the wing in November. The species have been recorded at saline wetlands and sites with saline soils.

== Taxonomy ==
This species was first described by Edward Meyrick in 1935 using two specimens collected by George Hudson at the Puhi Puhi River in Kaikōura in November. The specimens had been collected on stones on the riverbed. The male lectotype is held at the Natural History Museum, London.

== Description ==
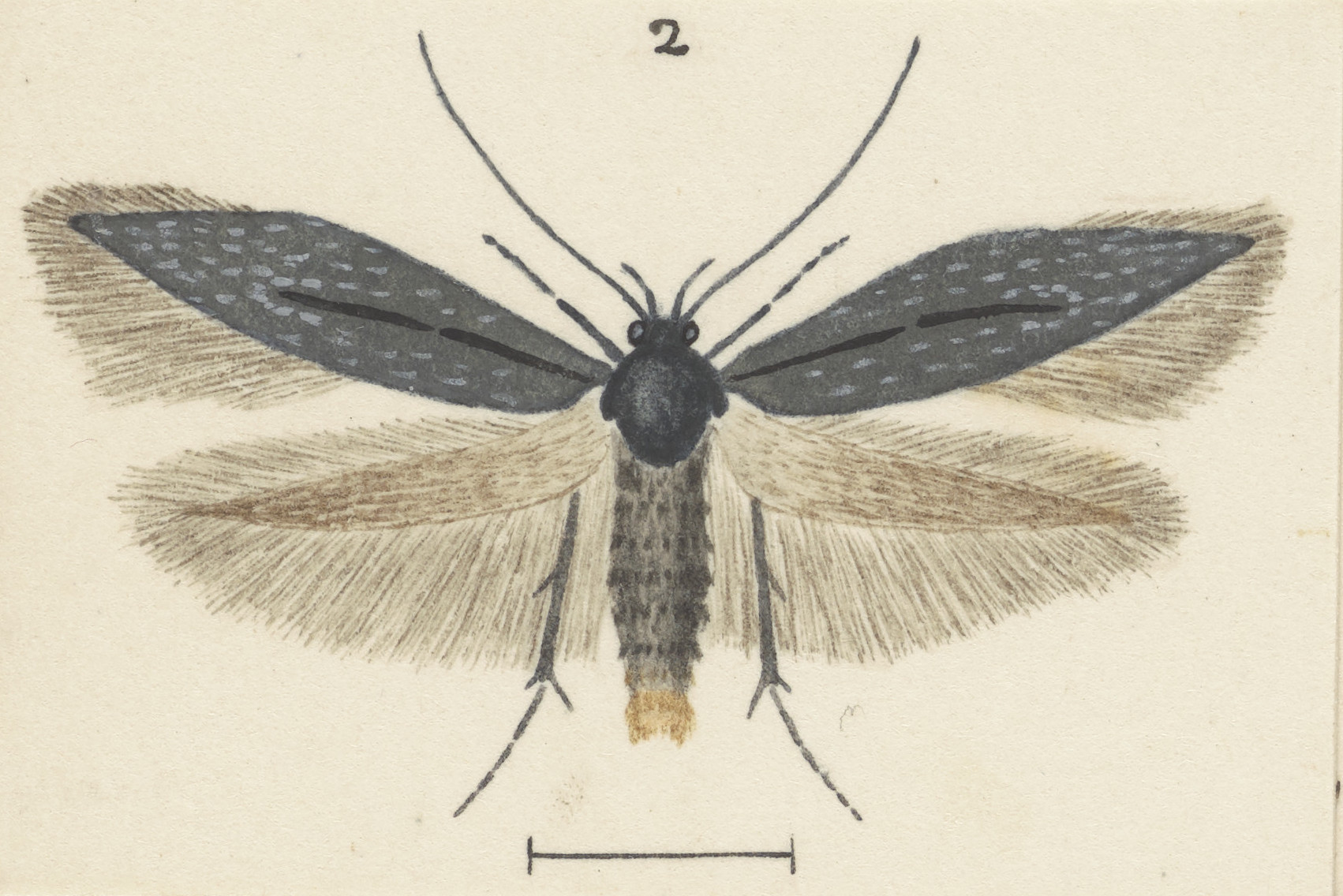
Image of S. triatma.

Meyrick described this species as follows:

♂. 10 mm. Head, palpi, thorax dark bluish-slaty-grey. Abdomen grey, ventral surface suffused pale ochreous, anal tuft pale greyish-ochreous. Forewings elongate-lanceolate; dark bluish-slaty-grey; stigmata indicated by hardly perceptible cloudy darker spots only visible in certain lights, plical and first discal transversely placed beyond middle, second discal at ¾; obscure spots of grey-whitish suffusion beneath fold at 1/3 and 2/3 and towards apex: cilia grey. Hindwings grey, paler towards base; cilia grey.

== Distribution ==
S. triatma is endemic to New Zealand. It has been collected in its type locality in Kaikōura and in Otago.

== Behaviour ==
The adults of this species are day flying and are on the wing in November. This species is not attracted to light.

== Habitat ==
This species has been found at sites with saline soils as well as at saline wetlands in Otago.
