= Scythris accumulata =

Scientific classification
- Kingdom: Animalia
- Phylum: Arthropoda
- Class: Insecta
- Order: Lepidoptera
- Family: Scythrididae
- Genus: Scythris
- Species: S. accumulata

Binomial name
- Scythris accumulata Meyrick, 1914

Species of moth

Scythris accumulata is a moth of the family Scythrididae. It was described by Edward Meyrick in 1914. It is found in Namibia, South Africa (Gauteng) and Zimbabwe.

The wingspan is about 14 mm. The forewings are white, finely and irregularly irrorated (sprinkled) with dark fuscous, tinged with grey towards the costa posteriorly, the white colour more conspicuous along an undefined and irregular median longitudinal streak, becoming a more defined white line on the apical third. The plical stigma is elongate, blackish, with the anterior extremity connected, by an undefined oblique blackish mark with the dorsum, these edged above with clear white, the dorsal area beneath them tinged with grey. The second discal stigma is blackish. The hindwings are light grey.
