= Scythris lactanea =

Scientific classification
- Kingdom: Animalia
- Phylum: Arthropoda
- Class: Insecta
- Order: Lepidoptera
- Family: Scythrididae
- Genus: Scythris
- Species: S. lactanea

Binomial name
- Scythris lactanea Meyrick, 1913

Species of moth

Scythris lactanea is a moth of the family Scythrididae. It was described by Edward Meyrick in 1913. It is found in the South African provinces of Gauteng and Mpumalanga.

The wingspan is 13–14 mm (0.51–0.55 in). The forewings are light fuscous, almost wholly suffused with ochreous whitish except for a more or less developed subcostal band. There are obscure fuscous dots towards the dorsum at one-third and the middle, and above the tornus. A suffused dark fuscous dot is found on the fold between the two former and the plical stigma is suffused and dark fuscous, the second discal round, distinct and dark fuscous. The hindwings are grey.
