= Scythris farrata =

Scientific classification
- Kingdom: Animalia
- Phylum: Arthropoda
- Clade: Pancrustacea
- Class: Insecta
- Order: Lepidoptera
- Family: Scythrididae
- Genus: Scythris
- Species: S. farrata

Binomial name
- Scythris farrata Meyrick, 1913

Species of moth

Scythris farrata is a moth of the family Scythrididae. It was described by Edward Meyrick in 1913. It is found in Mpumalanga, South Africa.

The wingspan is 12–13 mm. The forewings are whitish ochreous or greyish ochreous, more or less coarsely sprinkled with dark fuscous, the anterior half of the costa sometimes suffused with dark fuscous. The plical and second discal stigmata are rather large and dark fuscous, the plical connected with the dorsum by a slightly oblique bar of dark fuscous suffusion. The hindwings are grey.
