= Scythris eloquens =

Scientific classification
- Kingdom: Animalia
- Phylum: Arthropoda
- Class: Insecta
- Order: Lepidoptera
- Family: Scythrididae
- Genus: Scythris
- Species: S. eloquens

Binomial name
- Scythris eloquens Meyrick, 1921

Species of moth

Scythris eloquens is a moth of the family Scythrididae. It was described by Edward Meyrick in 1921. It is found in Kenya, Mozambique, and South Africa (KwaZulu-Natal).

The wingspan is about 11 mm. The forewings are fuscous, lighter on the dorsal area and with a moderate whitish streak from the base along the fold throughout, somewhat suffused on the termen. The plical and second discal stigmata form small roundish spots of darker fuscous suffusion indenting lower and upper margins of this respectively. The hindwings are rather dark grey.
