= Scythris brachyplecta =

Scientific classification
- Kingdom: Animalia
- Phylum: Arthropoda
- Class: Insecta
- Order: Lepidoptera
- Family: Scythrididae
- Genus: Scythris
- Species: S. brachyplecta

Binomial name
- Scythris brachyplecta Meyrick, 1928

Species of moth

Scythris brachyplecta is a moth of the family Scythrididae. It was described by Edward Meyrick in 1928. It is found in KwaZulu-Natal, South Africa.

The wingspan is about 19 mm. The forewings are white (overlying light grey), irregularly sprinkled with fuscous and with an oblique streak of dark fuscous irroration from the dorsum at one-fourth, reaching half across the wing. There is a short oblique dark fuscous mark from the second discal stigma to the termen. The hindwings are blue-grey-whitish.
