= Scythris mesoplecta =

Scientific classification
- Kingdom: Animalia
- Phylum: Arthropoda
- Class: Insecta
- Order: Lepidoptera
- Family: Scythrididae
- Genus: Scythris
- Species: S. mesoplecta

Binomial name
- Scythris mesoplecta Meyrick, 1921

Species of moth

Scythris mesoplecta is a moth of the family Scythrididae. It was described by Edward Meyrick in 1921. It is found in Namibia and South Africa (Eastern Cape).

The wingspan is about 16 mm. The forewings are whitish-ochreous, slightly greyish-tinged towards the costa except posteriorly and with an oblique dark grey streak from the dorsum beyond the middle reaching to the fold. There is some dark grey irroration on the end of the fold. The hindwings are grey, darker towards the apex.
