= Scythris anthracodelta =

Scientific classification
- Kingdom: Animalia
- Phylum: Arthropoda
- Class: Insecta
- Order: Lepidoptera
- Family: Scythrididae
- Genus: Scythris
- Species: S. anthracodelta

Binomial name
- Scythris anthracodelta Meyrick, 1911

Species of moth

Scythris anthracodelta is a moth of the family Scythrididae. It was described by Edward Meyrick in 1911. It is found in Limpopo, South Africa.

The wingspan is about 18 mm. The forewings are pale grey, thinly sprinkled with black points and with a triangular blackish blotch on the dorsum before the middle, reaching half way across the wing. There is an indistinct blackish dot in the disc before three-fourths. The hindwings are grey.
