= Scythris pelochyta =

Scientific classification
- Kingdom: Animalia
- Phylum: Arthropoda
- Clade: Pancrustacea
- Class: Insecta
- Order: Lepidoptera
- Family: Scythrididae
- Genus: Scythris
- Species: S. pelochyta

Binomial name
- Scythris pelochyta Meyrick, 1909

Synonyms
- Scythris psamathota Meyrick, 1913

Species of moth

Scythris pelochyta is a moth of the family Scythrididae. It was described by Edward Meyrick in 1909. It is found in the South African provinces of Gauteng and Mpumalanga.

The wingspan is about 12 mm. The forewings are whitish ochreous and the hindwings are grey.
