= Scythris ambustella =

Scientific classification
- Kingdom: Animalia
- Phylum: Arthropoda
- Clade: Pancrustacea
- Class: Insecta
- Order: Lepidoptera
- Family: Scythrididae
- Genus: Scythris
- Species: S. ambustella

Binomial name
- Scythris ambustella Bengtsson, 1997

Species of moth

Scythris ambustella is a moth of the family Scythrididae. It was described by Bengt Å. Bengtsson in 1997. It is found in Greece.

== Etymology ==
The species name refers to the appearance of the moth and is derived from Latin ambustum (meaning to burn).
