= Scythris cretiflua =

Scientific classification
- Kingdom: Animalia
- Phylum: Arthropoda
- Class: Insecta
- Order: Lepidoptera
- Family: Scythrididae
- Genus: Scythris
- Species: S. cretiflua

Binomial name
- Scythris cretiflua Meyrick, 1913

Species of moth

Scythris cretiflua is a moth of the family Scythrididae. It was described by Edward Meyrick in 1913. It is found in South Africa (Gauteng, Mpumalanga).

The wingspan is 12–14 mm. The forewings are ochreous whitish and the hindwings are pale greyish.
