= Scythris autochlorella =

Scientific classification
- Kingdom: Animalia
- Phylum: Arthropoda
- Class: Insecta
- Order: Lepidoptera
- Family: Scythrididae
- Genus: Scythris
- Species: S. autochlorella

Binomial name
- Scythris autochlorella Viette, 1956

Species of moth

Scythris autochlorella is a moth of the family Scythrididae. It was described by Pierre Viette in 1956. It is found in Madagascar.
