= List of moths of Namibia =

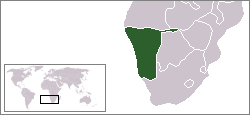
Location of Namibia

There are about 510 known moth species of Namibia. The moths (mostly nocturnal) and butterflies (mostly diurnal) together make up the taxonomic order Lepidoptera.

This is a list of moth species which have been recorded in Namibia.

== Amphisbatidae ==
- Paratemelia meyi Lvovsky, 2007
- Paratemelia namibiella Lvovsky, 2007

== Arctiidae ==
- Afrospilarctia flavida (Bartel, 1903)
- Alpenus whalleyi Watson, 1988
- Amata alicia (Butler, 1876)
- Amata damarensis (Grünberg, 1910)
- Amerila bauri Möschler, 1884
- Amerila bubo (Walker, 1855)
- Amsacta melanogastra (Holland, 1897)
- Apisa canescens Walker, 1855
- Apisa hildae Kiriakoff, 1961
- Cymaroa grisea (Thunberg, 1784)
- Eilema albostriatum Kühne, 2010
- Epilacydes simulans Butler, 1875
- Epilacydes unistriga (Grünberg, 1910)
- Eyralpenus scioana (Oberthür, 1880)
- Galtara nepheloptera (Hampson, 1910)
- Meneclia pallidula Grünberg, 1910
- Micralarctia australis Watson, 1988
- Micralarctia punctulatum (Wallengren, 1860)
- Owambarctia owamboensis Kiriakoff, 1957
- Paralacydes arborifera (Butler, 1875)
- Paralacydes destrictus Kühne, 2010
- Paralacydes jeskei (Grünberg, 1911)
- Paramaenas affinis (Rothschild, 1933)
- Paramaenas strigosus Grünberg, 1911
- Phlyctaenogastra britae Kühne, 2010
- Phlyctaenogastra familia Kühne, 2010
- Phlyctaenogastra rangei Gaede, 1915
- Saenura flava Wallengren, 1860
- Spilosoma lineata Walker, 1855
- Teracotona rhodophaea (Walker, 1865)
- Teracotona submacula (Walker, 1855)
- Thumatha punctata Kühne, 2010
- Thyretes caffra Wallengren, 1863
- Thyretes negus Oberthür, 1878
- Utetheisa pulchella (Linnaeus, 1758)

== Autostichidae ==
- Hesperesta rhyodes (Meyrick, 1909)
- Turatia turpicula Gozmány, 2000

== Carposinidae ==
- Carposina longipalpalis Mey, 2007
- Meridarchis regalis Mey, 2007

== Cecidosidae ==
- Scyrotis alticolaria Mey, 2007
- Scyrotis brandbergensis Mey, 2007
- Scyrotis namakarooensis Mey, 2007

== Choreutidae ==
- Choreutis aegyptiaca (Zeller, 1867)
- Tebenna micalis (Mann, 1857)

== Copromorphidae ==
- Rhynchoferella syncentra (Meyrick, 1916)

== Cosmopterigidae ==
- Gisilia conformata (Meyrick, 1921)
- Gisilia meyi Sinev, 2007
- Gisilia sclerodes (Meyrick, 1909)
- Gisilia stagnans (Meyrick, 1921)
- Gisilia stereodoxa (Meyrick, 1925)

== Cossidae ==
- Aethalopteryx forsteri (Clench, 1959)
- Aethalopteryx squameus (Distant, 1902)
- Aethalopteryx tristis (Gaede, 1915)
- Arctiocossus antargyreus Felder, 1874
- Arctiocossus danieli Clench, 1959
- Arctiocossus poliopterus Clench, 1959
- Arctiocossus strigulatus Gaede, 1929
- Arctiocossus tessellatus Clench, 1959
- Azygophleps asylas (Cramer, 1777)
- Azygophleps inclusa (Walker, 1856)
- Azygophleps leopardina Distant, 1902
- Azygophleps liturata (Aurivillius, 1879)
- Brachylia eutelia Clench, 1959
- Brachylia terebroides Felder, 1874
- Eulophonotus myrmeleon Felder, 1874
- Macrocossus coelebs Clench, 1959
- Macrocossus toluminus (Druce, 1887)
- Nomima deserticola Mey, 2007
- Nomima gaerdesi Mey, 2007
- Nomima montisusti Mey, 2007
- Nomima prophanes Durrant, 1916
- Pecticossus gaerdesi Daniel, 1956
- Phragmataecia andarana Clench, 1959
- Phragmataecia irrorata Hampson, 1910
- Phragmataecia okovangae Clench, 1959
- Pseudurgis maacki Mey, 2007
- Rethona strigosa Walker, 1855
- Xyleutes dictyotephra Clench, 1959

== Crambidae ==
- Glyphodes amphipeda (Meyrick, 1939)
- Heliothela ophideresana (Walker, 1863)
- Nomophila noctuella ([Denis & Schiffermüller], 1775)
- Pyrausta grisealis Maes, 2009

== Elachistidae ==
- Phthinostoma maculata Mey, 2007
- Phthinostoma taeniata Mey, 2007

== Eriocottidae ==
- Compsoctena araeopis (Meyrick, 1926)
- Compsoctena brandbergensis Mey, 2007
- Compsoctena leucoconis (Meyrick, 1926)

== Eupterotidae ==
- Jana eurymas Herrich-Schäffer, 1854
- Phiala costipuncta (Herrich-Schäffer, 1855)
- Trichophiala devylderi Aurivillius, 1879

== Gelechiidae ==
- Acutitornus munda Janse, 1951
- Allotelphusa lathridia (Meyrick, 1909)
- Anarsia agricola Walsingham, 1891
- Anarsia nimbosa Meyrick, 1913
- Argophara epaxia Janse, 1963
- Aspades hutchinsonella (Walsingham, 1891)
- Athrips albibasella Bidzilya, 2010
- Athrips albicostella Bidzilya, 2010
- Athrips angustisaccula Bidzilya, 2010
- Athrips bruneosparsa Janse, 1958
- Athrips dorsimaculata Bidzilya, 2010
- Athrips flavida Bidzilya, 2010
- Athrips hirtopalpa Bidzilya, 2010
- Athrips latipalpella Bidzilya, 2010
- Athrips mappigera Meyrick, 1914
- Athrips meyi Bidzilya, 2010
- Athrips neograpta Meyrick, 1914
- Athrips nigrinervosa Bidzilya, 2010
- Athrips pallida Bidzilya, 2010
- Athrips phoenaula (Meyrick, 1913)
- Athrips punctosa Bidzilya, 2010
- Athrips ravidinigra Bidzilya, 2010
- Ephysteris promptella (Staudinger, 1859)
- Gelechia sematica (Meyrick, 1913)
- Hedma microcasis (Meyrick, 1929)
- Hedma rhamnifoliae (Amsel & Hering, 1931)
- Hypatima austerodes (Meyrick, 1918)
- Lacistodes tauropis Meyrick, 1921
- Leuronoma oenochyta (Meyrick, 1921)
- Metzneria brandbergi Janse, 1963
- Microcraspedus synecta (Meyrick, 1909)
- Neotelphusa ochlerodes (Meyrick, 1925)
- Neotelphusa phaeomacula Janse, 1958
- Ochrodia pentamacula (Janse, 1958)
- Ochrodia subdiminutella (Stainton, 1867)
- Octonodula binotella Janse, 1951
- Ornativalva kalahariensis (Janse, 1960)
- Parapsectris alfonsi Bidzilya, 2010
- Parapsectris curvisaccula Bidzilya, 2010
- Parapsectris fastidiosa Meyrick, 1911
- Parapsectris griseoflavida Bidzilya, 2010
- Parapsectris lacunosa (Meyrick, 1918)
- Parapsectris modica Bidzilya, 2010
- Parapsectris nigrifasciata Bidzilya, 2010
- Parapsectris ochrocosma (Meyrick, 1911)
- Parapsectris ochrostigma Bidzilya, 2010
- Parapsectris savannae Bidzilya, 2010
- Parapsectris tholaea Meyrick, 1911
- Parapsectris violae Bidzilya, 2010
- Paratelphusa reducta Janse, 1958
- Parathectis sordidula (Meyrick, 1913)
- Polyhymno chionarcha Meyrick, 1913
- Polyhymno eurydoxa Meyrick, 1909
- Polyhymno hostilis Meyrick, 1918
- Polyhymno palinorsa Meyrick, 1909
- Polyhymno pausimacha Meyrick, 1909
- Schizovalva exoenota Meyrick, 1918
- Scrobipalpa aptatella (Walker, 1864)
- Scrobipalpa diversa (Janse, 1950)
- Scrobipalpa ergasima (Meyrick, 1916)
- Scrobipalpa vicaria (Meyrick, 1921)
- Stomopteryx eremopis (Meyrick, 1921)
- Streyella pallidigrisea Janse, 1958
- Syncopacma oxyspila (Meyrick, 1909)
- Syncopacma polychromella (Rebel, 1902)

== Geometridae ==
- Allochrostes uniornata Prout, 1935
- Androzeugma subacuta Prout, 1935
- Chiasmia brongusaria (Walker, 1860)
- Chiasmia diarmodia (Prout, 1925)
- Chiasmia getula (Wallengren, 1872)
- Chiasmia grimmia (Wallengren, 1872)
- Drepanogynis albiordine Prout, 1938
- Drepanogynis gynoloxa (Prout, 1938)
- Drepanogynis incondita (Warren, 1904)
- Drepanogynis olivescens (Warren, 1898)
- Mimoclystia corticearia (Aurivillius, 1910)
- Rhodophthitus tricoloraria (Mabille, 1890)
- Zamarada ascaphes Prout, 1925
- Zamarada ilma Prout, 1922
- Zamarada metallicata Warren, 1914
- Zamarada phaeozona Hampson, 1909
- Zamarada pulverosa Warren, 1895
- Zamarada tosta D. S. Fletcher, 1974

== Gracillariidae ==
- Acrocercops ficina Vári, 1961
- Acrocercops terminalina Vári, 1961
- Africephala timaea (Meyrick, 1914)
- Apistoneura psarochroma Vári, 1961
- Aspilapteryx filifera (Meyrick, 1912)
- Callicercops triceros (Meyrick, 1926)
- Caloptilia cataractias (Meyrick, 1921)
- Caloptilia cryphia Vári, 1961
- Caloptilia isotoma (Meyrick, 1914)
- Caloptilia pentaplaca (Meyrick, 1911)
- Caloptilia porphyranthes (Meyrick, 1921)
- Caloptilia sapina Vári, 1961
- Caloptilia sychnospila Vári, 1961
- Caloptilia verecunda Triberti, 2004
- Conopobathra carbunculata (Meyrick, 1912)
- Conopobathra geraea Vári, 1961
- Conopobathra gravissima (Meyrick, 1912)
- Conopobathra plethorhabda Vári, 1961
- Conopomorpha chionosema Vári, 1961
- Conopomorpha euphanes Vári, 1961
- Cryptolectica euryphanta (Meyrick, 1911)
- Cuphodes melanostola (Meyrick, 1918)
- Dysectopa scalifera Vári, 1961
- Ectropina ligata (Meyrick, 1912)
- Epicephala homostola Vári, 1961
- Epicephala pyrrhogastra Meyrick, 1908
- Graphiocephala barbitias (Meyrick, 1909)
- Pareclectis hobohmi Vári, 1961
- Phyllonorycter chionopa (Vári, 1961)
- Phyllonorycter didymopa (Vári, 1961)
- Phyllonorycter grewiaecola (Vári, 1961)
- Phyllonorycter grewiella (Vári, 1961)
- Phyllonorycter leucaspis Triberti, 2004
- Stomphastis cardamitis (Meyrick, 1921)
- Stomphastis crotonis Vári, 1961
- Stomphastis rorkei Vári, 1961
- Stomphastis thraustica (Meyrick, 1908)
- Stomphastis tremina Vári, 1961

== Lasiocampidae ==
- Anadiasa punctifascia Walker, 1855
- Beralade jordani Tams, 1936
- Bombycomorpha bifascia (Walker, 1855)
- Braura picturata (Grünberg, 1910)
- Chrysopsyche bivittata Aurivillius, 1927
- Gonometa postica Walker, 1855
- Metajana chanleri Holland, 1896
- Odontocheilopteryx obscura Aurivillius, 1927
- Philotherma rosa (Druce, 1887)
- Rhinobombyx cuneata Aurivillius, 1879
- Schausinna regia (Grünberg, 1910)
- Sena meyi Zolotuhin, 2007
- Sena parva (Aurivillius, 1921)
- Sena prompta (Walker, 1855)
- Sena quirimbo (Tams, 1936)
- Streblote pancala (Tams, 1936)

== Lecithoceridae ==
- Dragmatucha proaula Meyrick, 1908
- Lecithocera ideologa Meyrick, 1937

== Limacodidae ==
- Afrobirthama hobohmi Janse, 1964
- Coenobasis argentilinea Aurivillius, 1900
- Isozinara pallidifascia Janse, 1964
- Latoia eremotropha Janse, 1964
- Pseudothosea albisignata Janse, 1964
- Scotinochroa diplothysana Tams, 1932
- Taeda aetitis Wallengren, 1863

== Lymantriidae ==
- Bazisa transmutata Mey, 2007
- Crorema adspersa (Herrich-Schäffer, 1854)
- Crorema nigropunctata Collenette, 1931
- Crorema ochracea (Snellen, 1872)
- Euproctis consocia Walker, 1865
- Euproctis niropunctatum Kühne, 2010
- Homochira rendalli (Distant, 1897)
- Lacipa kottleri Kühne, 2010
- Laelia actuosa Hering, 1926
- Laelia amabilis Aurivillius, 1879
- Laelia extatura (Distant, 1897)
- Laelia extorta (Distant, 1897)
- Laelia gwelila (Swinhoe, 1903)
- Laelioproctis leucosphena Collenette, 1939
- Lymantica cidariensis Kühne, 2010
- Rhypopteryx diplogramma Hering, 1927
- Rhypopteryx sordida Aurivillius, 1879
- Tearosoma aspersum Felder, 1874
- Tearosoma daures Mey, 2007

== Metarbelidae ==
- Arbelodes dupreezi Lehmann, 2010
- Arbelodes heringi (Janse, 1930)
- Arbelodes kroonae Lehmann, 2007
- Kroonia heikeae Lehmann, 2010
- Kroonia honeyi Lehmann, 2010
- Metarbela kobesi Lehmann, 2007
- Metarbela naumanni Mey, 2005
- Metarbela trisignata Gaede, 1929
- Metarbela weinmanni Lehmann, 2007
- Salagena meyi Lehmann, 2007
- Teragra cammae Lehmann, 2007

== Noctuidae ==
- Achaea tolnaodes Berio, 1956
- Acontia annemaria Hacker, 2007
- Acontia antica Walker, 1862
- Acontia aureola Hacker, 2007
- Acontia aurivillii Hacker, Legrain & Fibiger, 2010
- Acontia chrysoproctis (Hampson, 1902)
- Acontia cimbebasia Hacker, 2007
- Acontia conifrons (Aurivillius, 1879)
- Acontia discoidea Hopffer, 1857
- Acontia ectorrida (Hampson, 1916)
- Acontia gratiosa Wallengren, 1856
- Acontia guttifera Felder & Rogenhofer, 1874
- Acontia imitatrix Wallengren, 1856
- Acontia insocia (Walker, 1857)
- Acontia namibiensis Hacker, Legrain & Fibiger, 2008
- Acontia natalis (Guenée, 1852)
- Acontia okahandja Hacker, Legrain & Fibiger, 2008
- Acontia opalinoides Guenée, 1852
- Acontia permutata Hacker, Legrain & Fibiger, 2008
- Acontia porphyrea (Butler, 1898)
- Acontia simo Wallengren, 1860
- Acontia spangbergi Aurivillius, 1879
- Acontia torrefacta (Distant, 1898)
- Acontia transfigurata Wallengren, 1856
- Acontia trimaculata Aurivillius, 1879
- Acontia trychaenoides Wallengren, 1856
- Acontia umbrigera Felder & Rogenhofer, 1874
- Acontia wahlbergi Wallengren, 1856
- Acontia wallengreni Aurivillius, 1879
- Acontia wolframmeyi Hacker, 2007
- Aegle dubiosa Kühne, 2010
- Asplenia melanodonta (Hampson, 1896)
- Audea melanoplaga Hampson, 1902
- Brevipecten brandbergensis Hacker, 2004
- Brevipecten cornuta Hampson, 1902
- Brevipecten wolframmeyi Hacker & Fibiger, 2007
- Ctenusa pallida (Hampson, 1902)
- Ctenusa varians (Wallengren, 1863)
- Cucullia terensis Felder & Rogenhofer, 1874
- Cyligramma latona (Cramer, 1775)
- Diaphone eumela (Stoll, 1781)
- Dysmilichia namibiae Hacker, 2007
- Eustrotia genuflexa (Hampson, 1902)
- Grammodes stolida (Fabricius, 1775)
- Heraclia abacata (Karsch, 1892)
- Heraclia lomata (Karsch, 1892)
- Heraclia longipennis (Walker, 1854)
- Honeyia clearchus (Fawcett, 1916)
- Honeyia quarta Hacker & Fibiger, 2007
- Hypena senialis Guenée, 1854
- Hypersypnoides congoensis Berio, 1954
- Iambiodes incerta (Rothschild, 1913)
- Masalia disticta (Hampson, 1902)
- Masalia leucosticta (Hampson, 1902)
- Masalia quilengesi Seymour, 1972
- Omphaloceps daria (Druce, 1895)
- Ophiusa dianaris (Guenée, 1852)
- Ophiusa umbrilinea Hampson, 1902
- Oraesia emarginata (Fabricius, 1794)
- Oraesia provocans Walker, [1858]
- Ozarba acclivis (Felder & Rogenhofer, 1874)
- Ozarba cinerea (Aurivillius, 1879)
- Ozarba damarensis Berio, 1940
- Ozarba devylderi Berio, 1940
- Ozarba gaedei Berio, 1940
- Ozarba gobabis Berio, 1940
- Ozarba inopinata Berio, 1940
- Ozarba jansei Berio, 1940
- Ozarba malaisei Berio, 1940
- Ozarba persinua Berio, 1940
- Paida pulchra (Trimen, 1863)
- Plecopterodes lutosa (Grünberg, 1910)
- Polydesma umbricola Boisduval, 1833
- Proschaliphora albida Hampson, 1909
- Proschaliphora aurata Kühne, 2010
- Proschaliphora lineata Kühne, 2010
- Proschaliphora minima Kühne, 2010
- Sphingomorpha chlorea (Cramer, 1777)
- Stenosticta namibiensis Hacker & Mey, 2010
- Stenosticta nigrescens Hacker & Mey, 2010
- Stenosticta virgata Hacker & Mey, 2010
- Thiacidas duplicata (Grünberg, 1910)
- Thiacidas krooni Hacker & Zilli, 2007
- Thiacidas permutata Hacker & Zilli, 2007
- Thiacidas postalbida (Gaede, 1939)
- Thiacidas roseotincta (Pinhey, 1962)
- Ulochlaena ferruginea (Gaede, 1915)
- Ulochlaena reducta (Gaede, 1915)
- Ulochlaena sagittata (Gaede, 1915)
- Ulochlaena schaeferi Gaede, 1915

== Nolidae ==
- Arcyophora ledereri (Wallengren, 1863)
- Neaxestis aviuncis Wiltshire, 1985

== Notodontidae ==
- Afroplitis dasychirina (Gaede, 1928)
- Afroplitis pylades (Kiriakoff, 1955)
- Antheuella psolometopa (Tams, 1929)
- Atrasana grisea (Gaede, 1928)
- Cerurina marshalli (Hampson, 1910)
- Metopteryx mus (Gaede, 1928)
- Phalera atrata (Grünberg, 1907)
- Phalera lydenburgi Distant, 1899
- Phyllaliodes poliostrota (Hampson, 1910)
- Stenostaura elegans Kiriakoff, 1970

== Oecophoridae ==
- Stathmopoda ficivora Kasy, 1973

== Plutellidae ==
- Paraxenistis serrata Mey, 2007
- Plutella xylostella (Linnaeus, 1758)

== Psychidae ==
- Australoplacodoma bicolorata Sobczyk & Mey, 2007
- Chalia maledicta Scheven, 1910
- Eumeta cervina Druce, 1887
- Kotochalia junodi (Heylaerts, 1890)
- Lithopleurota monachopis Meyrick, 1939
- Narycia antibatis Meyrick, 1926
- Narycia isoxantha Meyrick, 1920
- Patromasia petroglypta Meyrick, 1926
- Penestoglossa dyscrita Meyrick, 1926
- Picrospora maculasquamosa Sobczyk & Mey, 2007
- Placodoma brandbergensis Sobczyk & Mey, 2007
- Thranitica hemicopa Meyrick, 1908

== Pterophoridae ==
- Agdistis lomholdti Gielis, 1990
- Agdistis namibiana Arenberger, 1988
- Agdistis pala Arenberger, 1986
- Agdistis piccolo Gielis, 1990
- Agdistis spinosa Arenberger, 1986
- Agdistis swakopi Arenberger, 2009
- Agdistis tsumkwe Arenberger, 2001
- Hellinsia brandbergi Arenberger, 2004
- Marasmarcha verax (Meyrick, 1909)
- Megalorhipida leucodactylus (Fabricius, 1794)
- Pterophorus rhyparias (Meyrick, 1908)

== Pyralidae ==
- Abachausia grisea Balinsky, 1994
- Acrobasis africanella Balinsky, 1994
- Aglossa phaealis Hampson, 1906
- Aglossa rhodalis Hampson, 1906
- Aglossa tinealis Leraut, 2007
- Ancylosis atrisparsella (Hampson, 1901)
- Ancylosis glaphyria Balinsky, 1987
- Ancylosis interjectella (Ragonot, 1888)
- Ancylosis namibiella Balinsky, 1987
- Ancylosis ocellella (Hampson, 1901)
- Ancylosis subpyrethrella (Ragonot, 1888)
- Arsissa transvaalica Balinsky, 1991
- Cadra figulilella (Gregson, 1871)
- Ceutholopha isidis (Zeller, 1867)
- Delopterus basalis Janse, 1922
- Epicrocis nigrinella (Balinsky, 1994)
- Epicrocis picta (Balinsky, 1991)
- Epilepia melanobasis (Hampson, 1906)
- Epilepia melanobrunnea (Janse, 1922)
- Epilepia meyi Speidel, 2007
- Episindris albimaculalis Ragonot, 1891
- Etiella zinckenella (Treitschke, 1832)
- Euzopherodes capicola Balinsky, 1994
- Faveria dionysia (Zeller, 1846)
- Hypargyria metalliferella Ragonot, 1888
- Hypotia brandbergensis Leraut, 2007
- Hypotia decembralis Leraut, 2007
- Hypotia dinteri Grünberg, 1910
- Hypotia eberti Leraut, 2007
- Hypotia meyi Leraut, 2007
- Hypotia namibiensis Leraut, 2007
- Loryma sinuosalis Leraut, 2007
- Namibina namibicola Leraut, 2007
- Namibiodes brandbergensis Leraut, 2007
- Pithyllis metachryseis (Hampson, 1906)
- Pithyllis pallidalis Leraut, 2007
- Pseudozitha alticolalis Leraut, 2007
- Pyralosis polycyclophora (Hampson, 1916)
- Scotomera fuliginosalis Leraut, 2007
- Staudingeria mimeugraphella Balinsky, 1989
- Synaphe fuscochralis Leraut, 2007
- Thylacoptila paurosema Meyrick, 1885
- Tyndis namibiensis Leraut, 2007
- Veldticola megista Hampson, 1930

== Saturniidae ==
- Epiphora bauhiniae (Guérin-Méneville, 1832)
- Gynanisa maja (Klug, 1836)
- Gynanisa zimba Darge, 2008
- Heniocha apollonia (Cramer, 1779)
- Heniocha distincta Bryk, 1939
- Heniocha dyops (Maassen, 1872)
- Ludia corticea Jordan, 1922
- Ludia delegorguei (Boisduval, 1847)
- Pseudobunaea tyrrhena (Westwood, 1849)
- Usta wallengrenii (C. & R. Felder, 1859)

== Sesiidae ==
- Echidgnathia khomasana de Freina, 2011
- Melittia aurociliata (Aurivillius, 1879)

== Sphingidae ==
- Acherontia atropos (Linnaeus, 1758)
- Agrius convolvuli (Linnaeus, 1758)
- Hippotion celerio (Linnaeus, 1758)
- Hippotion rosae (Butler, 1882)
- Hoplistopus penricei Rothschild & Jordan, 1903
- Hyles livornica (Esper, 1780)
- Nephele comma Hopffer, 1857
- Oligographa juniperi (Boisduval, 1847)
- Phylloxiphia punctum (Rothschild, 1907)
- Polyptychoides grayii (Walker, 1856)
- Pseudoclanis diana Gehlen, 1922
- Rufoclanis numosae (Wallengren, 1860)

== Thyrididae ==
- Arniocera amoena Jordan, 1907
- Arniocera cyanoxantha (Mabille, 1893)
- Bupota galbana Whalley, 1971
- Chrysotypus subflavus Whalley, 1971
- Dysodia incognita Whalley, 1968
- Dysodia intermedia (Walker, 1865)
- Dysodia subsignata Warren, 1908
- Rhodoneura abacha Whalley, 1971

== Tineidae ==
- Ceratophaga vastellus (Zeller, 1852)
- Probatostola ochromalla Meyrick, 1926
- Tinea melancholica Gozmány, 1967
- Tinea roesleri Gozmány, 1969
- Tracheloteina virgo Gozmány, 1967
- Trichophaga cuspidata Gozmány, 1967

== Tischeriidae ==
- Coptotriche africana Puplesis & Diskus, 2003
- Tischeria antilope Puplesis, Diškus & Mey, 2003
- Tischeria sparmanniae Puplesis & Diškus, 2003

== Tortricidae ==
- Bactra tylophora Diakonoff, 1963
- Cydia ichthyura (Meyrick, 1926)
- Cydia malesana (Meyrick, 1920)
- Eccopsis incultana (Walker, 1863)
- Eugnosta cataracta Aarvik, 2004
- Eugnosta meyi Aarvik, 2004
- Eugnosta namibiana Aarvik, 2004
- Megalota namibiana Aarvik, 2004
- Metendothenia balanacma (Meyrick, 1914)
- Selania costifuscana Aarvik, 2004
- Thiodia excavana Aarvik, 2004

== Uraniidae ==
- Pseudodirades lactea (Warren, 1897)

== Xyloryctidae ==
- Scythris camelella Walsingham, 1907
- Scythris fluctuosa Meyrick, 1914
- Scythris kebirella Amsel, 1935
- Scythris stagnosa Meyrick, 1913

== Yponomeutidae ==
- Prays oleae (Bernard, 1788)
- Yponomeuta subplumbellus Walsingham, 1881

== Zygaenidae ==
- Zutulba namaqua (Boisduval, 1847)
