= Athrips aquila =

Scientific classification
- Kingdom: Animalia
- Phylum: Arthropoda
- Clade: Pancrustacea
- Class: Insecta
- Order: Lepidoptera
- Family: Gelechiidae
- Genus: Athrips
- Species: A. aquila

Binomial name
- Athrips aquila Junnilainen, 2010

Species of moth

Athrips aquila is a moth of the family Gelechiidae. It is found in Russia (the southern Ural) and south-eastern Kazakhstan. The habitat consists of steppes with dominant shrubs such as Spiraea crenata, Spiraea hypericifolia, Caragana frutex and Cotoneaster melanocarpus.

The wingspan is 15–17 mm for males and 13.5 mm for females. Adults are on wing from mid-June to late August.
