= Athrips stepposa =

Scientific classification
- Domain: Eukaryota
- Kingdom: Animalia
- Phylum: Arthropoda
- Class: Insecta
- Order: Lepidoptera
- Family: Gelechiidae
- Genus: Athrips
- Species: A. stepposa

Binomial name
- Athrips stepposa Bidzilya, 2005

Species of moth

Athrips stepposa is a moth of the family Gelechiidae. It is found in Ukraine, Russia (southern Ural and Siberia: Tuva), north-western Kazakhstan and Kyrgyzstan.

The wingspan is 8.5–10 mm. Adults are on wing from mid-May to mid-June and again from July to early August in two generations per year.

The larvae feed on Caragana frutex.
