= Lakenheath Poor's Fen =

Protected area in Suffolk, England

Coordinates: 52.416°N 0.5°E

- Site of Special Scientific Interest
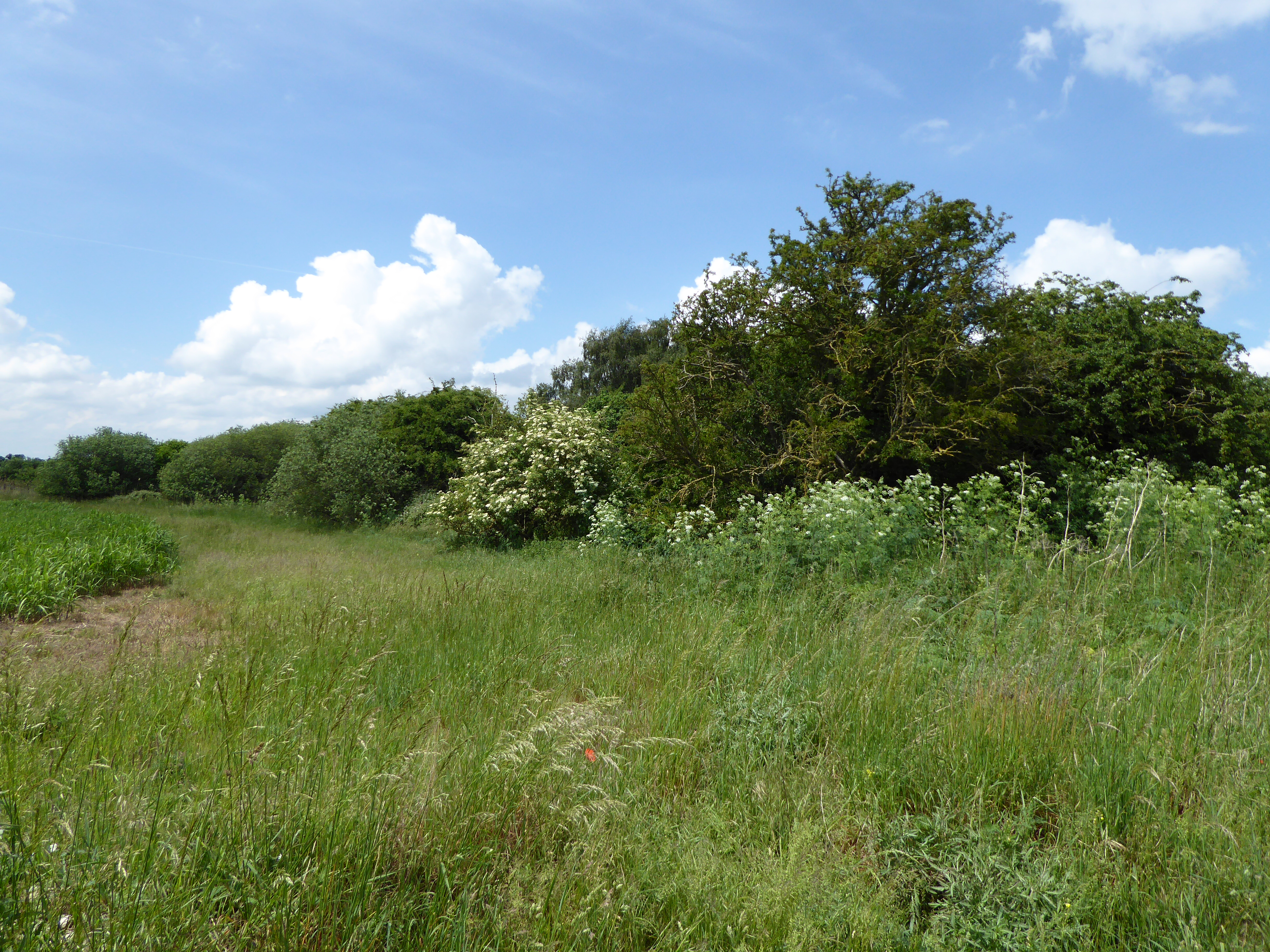
- Location of Lakenheath Poor's Fen.
- Area of search: Suffolk
- Grid reference: TL 701 827
- Interest: Biological
- Area: 5.2 hectares
- Notification date: 1985
- Location map: Magic Map

Lakenheath Poor's Fen is a 5.2-hectare biological Site of Special Scientific Interest west of Lakenheath in Suffolk.

This is mainly fen with diverse flora, and there are also areas of damp grassland, ditches and dykes. The grassland is grazed by cattle, and it has flowering plants including marsh pennywort and cuckoo flower. The site has a nationally rare plant, marsh pea.

The site is private land with no public access.
