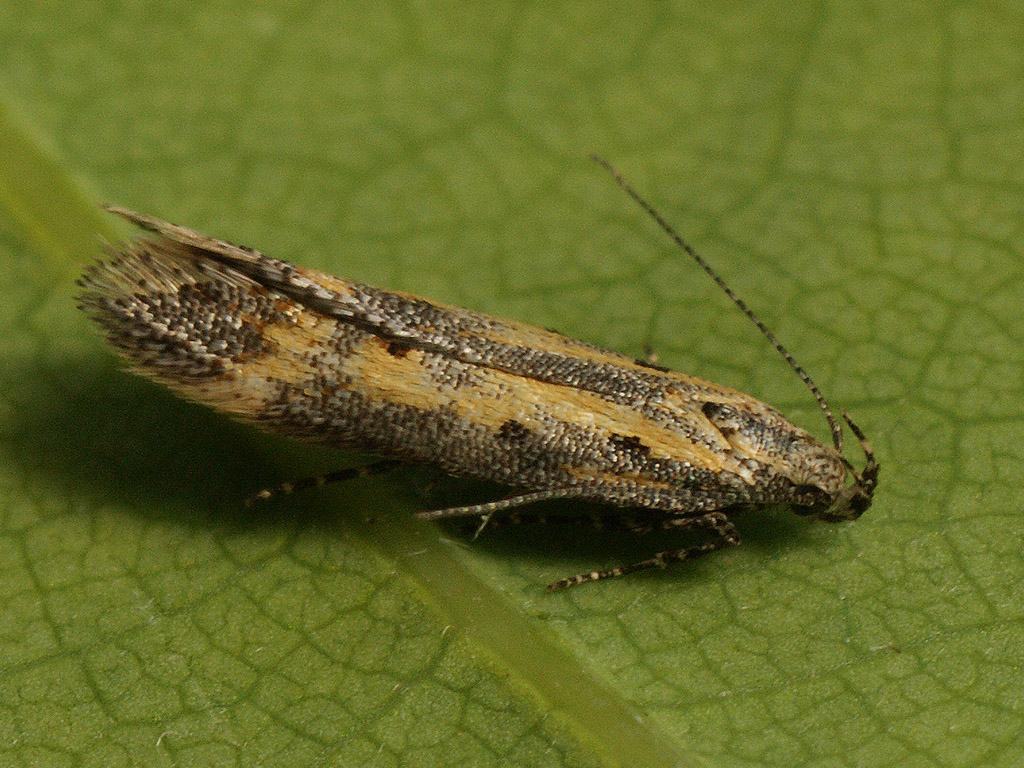

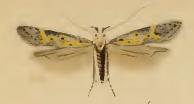

Scientific classification
- Domain: Eukaryota
- Kingdom: Animalia
- Phylum: Arthropoda
- Class: Insecta
- Order: Lepidoptera
- Family: Gelechiidae
- Genus: Athrips
- Species: A. tetrapunctella

Binomial name
- Athrips tetrapunctella (Thunberg, 1794)

Synonyms
- Tinea tetrapunctella Thunberg, 1794; Gelechia lathyri Stainton, 1865; Gelechia lathyrella Doubleday, 1866

= Athrips tetrapunctella =

Species of moth

Athrips tetrapunctella is a species of moth in the family Gelechiidae. It is found in France, Great Britain, Ireland, Fennoscandia, Denmark, Estonia, Latvia, Russia and Ukraine. In the east, the range extends through the southern Ural and Siberia to Primorsky Krai.

== Description ==
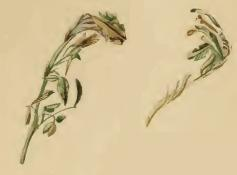
Sprigs of Medicago sativa eaten by larva

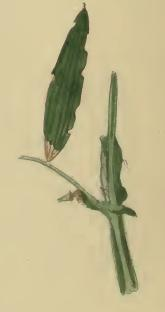
A sprig of Lathyrus palustris with a larval web

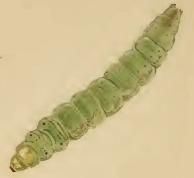
Larva

The wingspan is 9–10 mm. The forewings are pale ochreous-yellowish, suffused with deeper yellow in the disc with a thick dark grey costal streak from base to 3/4, including a yellow streak near base. An irregular sometimes interrupted dorsal streak and an apical patch are dark grey. A black discal dot near the base. The first discal stigma and a small round spot above tornus also black. The hindwings are light grey.

The larvae feed on Lathyrus palustris and Medicago sativa.
