= Octonodula =

Scientific classification
- Domain: Eukaryota
- Kingdom: Animalia
- Phylum: Arthropoda
- Class: Insecta
- Order: Lepidoptera
- Family: Gelechiidae
- Subfamily: Anacampsinae
- Genus: Octonodula; Janse, 1951

Genus of moths

Octonodula is a genus of moth in the family Gelechiidae.

== Species ==
- Octonodula binotella Janse, 1951
- Octonodula inumbrata (Meyrick, 1914)
