= Athrips zetterstedtiella =

Scientific classification
- Kingdom: Animalia
- Phylum: Arthropoda
- Clade: Pancrustacea
- Class: Insecta
- Order: Lepidoptera
- Family: Gelechiidae
- Genus: Athrips
- Species: A. zetterstedtiella

Binomial name
- Athrips zetterstedtiella (Zeller, 1852)

Synonyms
- Gelechia zetterstedtiella Zeller, 1852; Parapsectris zetterstedtiella

Species of moth

Athrips zetterstedtiella is a moth of the family Gelechiidae. It is found in Zimbabwe and South Africa.
