= Athrips studiosa =

Scientific classification
- Kingdom: Animalia
- Phylum: Arthropoda
- Class: Insecta
- Order: Lepidoptera
- Family: Gelechiidae
- Genus: Athrips
- Species: A. studiosa

Binomial name
- Athrips studiosa (Meyrick, 1905)

Synonyms
- Epithectis studiosa Meyrick, 1905

Species of moth

Athrips studiosa is a moth of the family Gelechiidae. It is found in Sri Lanka.

The wingspan is 9–10 mm. The forewings are pale whitish-ochreous, brownish-tinged, towards the apex with the scales somewhat roughened. There is an obscure streak of fuscous suffusion from the disc beyond the middle to the apex. The hindwings are pale whitish-ochreous.
