= Athrips ptychophora =

Scientific classification
- Kingdom: Animalia
- Phylum: Arthropoda
- Class: Insecta
- Order: Lepidoptera
- Family: Gelechiidae
- Genus: Athrips
- Species: A. ptychophora

Binomial name
- Athrips ptychophora (Meyrick, 1914)

Synonyms
- Epithectis ptychophora Meyrick, 1914

Species of moth

Athrips ptychophora is a moth of the family Gelechiidae. It is found in South Africa, where it has been recorded from Eastern Cape, Western Cape and Mpumalanga.

The wingspan is 8–11 mm. The forewings are rather dark fuscous irrorated with white and with a costal fold in males extending from the base to the middle. There is an ochreous subbasal dot in the middle and in females an ochreous longitudinal mark beneath the costa towards the base. There are two blackish dots obliquely placed above and below the fold at one-fourth, the lower sometimes centred with ochreous. There is also a small ochreous spot towards the costa before the middle and a black dot above the middle of the disc, edged beneath with ochreous. Two small ochreous spots are transversely placed at the end of the cell, partially edged or connected with black and there are a few scattered black scales posteriorly. The hindwings are grey, in males irrorated with darker except in the disc and towards the base.
