= Echidgnathia vitrifasciata =

Scientific classification
- Kingdom: Animalia
- Phylum: Arthropoda
- Class: Insecta
- Order: Lepidoptera
- Family: Sesiidae
- Genus: Echidgnathia
- Species: E. vitrifasciata

Binomial name
- Echidgnathia vitrifasciata (Hampson, 1910)

Synonyms
- Tinthia vitrifasciata Hampson, 1910

Species of moth

Echidgnathia vitrifasciata is a moth of the family Sesiidae. It is known from Somalia and Zimbabwe.
