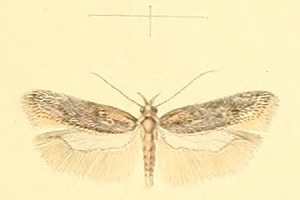

Scientific classification
- Domain: Eukaryota
- Kingdom: Animalia
- Phylum: Arthropoda
- Class: Insecta
- Order: Lepidoptera
- Family: Gelechiidae
- Genus: Athrips
- Species: A. thymifoliella

Binomial name
- Athrips thymifoliella (Constant, 1893)

Synonyms
- Lita thymifoliella Constant, 1893; Lita thymifoliella var. glaucella Chrétien, 1915

= Athrips thymifoliella =

Species of moth

Athrips thymifoliella is a moth of the family Gelechiidae. It is found in North Africa, France and Spain.

The wingspan is about 10–12 mm. Adults are on wing in October and November.

The larvae feed on Fumana thymifolia. They feed between spun leaves from within a silken tube.
