= Athrips kerzhneri =

Scientific classification
- Kingdom: Animalia
- Phylum: Arthropoda
- Clade: Pancrustacea
- Class: Insecta
- Order: Lepidoptera
- Family: Gelechiidae
- Genus: Athrips
- Species: A. kerzhneri

Binomial name
- Athrips kerzhneri Piskunov, 1990

Species of moth

Athrips kerzhneri is a moth of the family Gelechiidae. It is found in Mongolia, Russia (Tuva) and China (Inner Mongolia).

The wingspan is 8–11 mm.
