= Hoplistopus butti =

Scientific classification
- Domain: Eukaryota
- Kingdom: Animalia
- Phylum: Arthropoda
- Class: Insecta
- Order: Lepidoptera
- Family: Sphingidae
- Genus: Hoplistopus
- Species: H. butti

Binomial name
- Hoplistopus butti Rothschild & Jordan, 1903

Species of moth

Hoplistopus butti is a moth of the family Sphingidae. It is known from South Africa and Namibia.
