= Athrips patockai =

Scientific classification
- Kingdom: Animalia
- Phylum: Arthropoda
- Clade: Pancrustacea
- Class: Insecta
- Order: Lepidoptera
- Family: Gelechiidae
- Genus: Athrips
- Species: A. patockai

Binomial name
- Athrips patockai (Povolný, 1979)

Synonyms
- Rhynchopacha patockai Povolný, 1979

Species of moth

Athrips patockai is a moth of the family Gelechiidae. It is found in Slovakia, Slovenia, Romania, Ukraine and Russia.

The larvae feed on Spiraea media between spun leaves.
