= Athrips fagoniae =

Scientific classification
- Domain: Eukaryota
- Kingdom: Animalia
- Phylum: Arthropoda
- Class: Insecta
- Order: Lepidoptera
- Family: Gelechiidae
- Genus: Athrips
- Species: A. fagoniae

Binomial name
- Athrips fagoniae (Walsingham, 1904)

Synonyms
- Leobatus fagoniae Walsingham, 1904; Lita cervinella Turati, 1934 (preocc. Eversmann, 1844); Gelechia rosinansella Lucas, 1942

Species of moth

Athrips fagoniae is a moth of the family Gelechiidae. It is found on the Canary Islands and in North Africa (Algeria, Libya, Tunisia, Egypt) and Jordan.

The wingspan is about 15 mm. Adults are on wing from December to April and in early June.

The larvae have been recorded feeding on Fagonia glutinosa and Fagonia sinaica.
