= Paratelphusa griseoptera =

Scientific classification
- Domain: Eukaryota
- Kingdom: Animalia
- Phylum: Arthropoda
- Class: Insecta
- Order: Lepidoptera
- Family: Gelechiidae
- Genus: Paratelphusa
- Species: P. griseoptera

Binomial name
- Paratelphusa griseoptera Janse, 1958

Species of moth

Paratelphusa griseoptera is a moth in the family Gelechiidae. It was described by Anthonie Johannes Theodorus Janse in 1958. It is found in South Africa.
