= Athrips sibirica =

Scientific classification
- Domain: Eukaryota
- Kingdom: Animalia
- Phylum: Arthropoda
- Class: Insecta
- Order: Lepidoptera
- Family: Gelechiidae
- Genus: Athrips
- Species: A. sibirica

Binomial name
- Athrips sibirica Bidzilya, 2005

Species of moth

Athrips sibirica is a moth of the family Gelechiidae. It is found in Russia (Altai), Mongolia and China (Hebei). The habitat consists of steppes and forest-steppes in the mountains.

The wingspan is 14–16 mm. Adults are on wing June to July.
