= Athrips cretulata =

Scientific classification
- Kingdom: Animalia
- Phylum: Arthropoda
- Class: Insecta
- Order: Lepidoptera
- Family: Gelechiidae
- Genus: Athrips
- Species: A. cretulata

Binomial name
- Athrips cretulata (Meyrick, 1927)

Synonyms
- Gelechia cretulata Meyrick, 1927

Species of moth

Athrips cretulata is a moth of the family Gelechiidae. It is found in South Africa.

The wingspan is about 17 mm. The forewings are light grey, irregularly irrorated white, with some scattered dark grey or black scales. There is a white line along the fold to the middle of the wing, where the black scales sometimes form an undefined group. The hindwings are whitish-grey.
