= Athrips falkovitshi =

Scientific classification
- Kingdom: Animalia
- Phylum: Arthropoda
- Clade: Pancrustacea
- Class: Insecta
- Order: Lepidoptera
- Family: Gelechiidae
- Genus: Athrips
- Species: A. falkovitshi

Binomial name
- Athrips falkovitshi Piskunov, 1990

Species of moth

Athrips falkovitshi is a moth of the family Gelechiidae. It is found in Turkmenistan and Uzbekistan. The habitat consists of deserts.

The wingspan is 11–12 mm. Adults are on wing from the end of April to early June.
