= Octonodula inumbrata =

Scientific classification
- Kingdom: Animalia
- Phylum: Arthropoda
- Class: Insecta
- Order: Lepidoptera
- Family: Gelechiidae
- Genus: Octonodula
- Species: O. inumbrata

Binomial name
- Octonodula inumbrata (Meyrick, 1914)

Synonyms
- Anacampsis inumbrata Meyrick, 1914

Species of moth

Octonodula inumbrata is a moth of the family Gelechiidae. It was described by Edward Meyrick in 1914 and found in South Africa.

The wingspan is 12–15 mm. The forewings are dark purplish fuscous, with the tips of the scales pale purplish grey. The stigmata are obscure, cloudy, and dark fuscous, the plical obliquely before the first discal. There is a small indistinct grey-whitish spot on the costa at two-thirds, and the hindwings are dark grey.
