= Athrips polymaculella =

Scientific classification
- Domain: Eukaryota
- Kingdom: Animalia
- Phylum: Arthropoda
- Class: Insecta
- Order: Lepidoptera
- Family: Gelechiidae
- Genus: Athrips
- Species: A. polymaculella

Binomial name
- Athrips polymaculella Park, 1991

Species of moth

Athrips polymaculella is a moth of the family Gelechiidae. It is found in the southern Krasnojarsk region (Minussinsk) and Chitinskaja oblast in Siberia, China (Henan), Korea, Japan and Taiwan. There are records from the eastern part of European Russia (the southern Ural), but these need confirmation.

The wingspan is 13–16 mm. Adults are on wing in May in Korea and from the end of May to June in Russia.
