= Athrips gerasimovi =

Scientific classification
- Kingdom: Animalia
- Phylum: Arthropoda
- Clade: Pancrustacea
- Class: Insecta
- Order: Lepidoptera
- Family: Gelechiidae
- Genus: Athrips
- Species: A. gerasimovi

Binomial name
- Athrips gerasimovi Piskunov, 1982

Species of moth

Athrips gerasimovi is a moth of the family Gelechiidae. It is found in Mongolia.

The wingspan is 12–15 mm. Adults are on wing from August to early September.
