= Athrips huangshana =

Scientific classification
- Domain: Eukaryota
- Kingdom: Animalia
- Phylum: Arthropoda
- Class: Insecta
- Order: Lepidoptera
- Family: Gelechiidae
- Genus: Athrips
- Species: A. huangshana

Binomial name
- Athrips huangshana Bidzilya & Li, 2009

Species of moth

Athrips huangshana is a moth of the family Gelechiidae. It is found in Anhui, China.

The wingspan is about 12 mm.

== Etymology ==
The species name refers to Huangshan City, the type locality.
