= Athrips spiraeae =

Scientific classification
- Domain: Eukaryota
- Kingdom: Animalia
- Phylum: Arthropoda
- Class: Insecta
- Order: Lepidoptera
- Family: Gelechiidae
- Genus: Athrips
- Species: A. spiraeae

Binomial name
- Athrips spiraeae (Staudinger, 1871)

Synonyms
- Gelechia spiraeae Staudinger, 1871

Species of moth

Athrips spiraeae is a moth of the family Gelechiidae. It is found in Ukraine, Russia (southern Ural, Lower Volga and Altai) and Kazakhstan.

The larvae probably feed on Spiraea species.
