= Athrips mongolorum =

Scientific classification
- Kingdom: Animalia
- Phylum: Arthropoda
- Clade: Pancrustacea
- Class: Insecta
- Order: Lepidoptera
- Family: Gelechiidae
- Genus: Athrips
- Species: A. mongolorum

Binomial name
- Athrips mongolorum Piskunov, 1980

Synonyms
- Athrips crassivalva Li & Zheng, 1998

Species of moth

Athrips mongolorum is a moth of the family Gelechiidae. It is found in Mongolia, Turkmenistan, south-eastern Kazakhstan and China (Ningxia).

The wingspan is 9–12 mm. Adults are on wing from mid-March to early June and again in September in two generations per year.

The larvae feed on Nitraria schoberi. The species overwinters in the pupal stage.
