= Athrips asarinella =

Scientific classification
- Domain: Eukaryota
- Kingdom: Animalia
- Phylum: Arthropoda
- Class: Insecta
- Order: Lepidoptera
- Family: Gelechiidae
- Genus: Athrips
- Species: A. asarinella

Binomial name
- Athrips asarinella (Chrétien, 1930)

Synonyms
- Epithectis asarinella Chrétien, 1930

Species of moth

Athrips asarinella is a moth of the family Gelechiidae. It is found in France.

The larvae feed on Antirrhinum asarina.
