= Athrips carthaginella =

Scientific classification
- Domain: Eukaryota
- Kingdom: Animalia
- Phylum: Arthropoda
- Class: Insecta
- Order: Lepidoptera
- Family: Gelechiidae
- Genus: Athrips
- Species: A. carthaginella

Binomial name
- Athrips carthaginella (Lucas, 1940)

Synonyms
- Phthorimaea carthaginella Lucas, 1940

Species of moth

Athrips carthaginella is a moth of the family Gelechiidae. It is found in Tunisia.

The wingspan is about 9 mm.
