= Athrips nigrogrisea =

Scientific classification
- Domain: Eukaryota
- Kingdom: Animalia
- Phylum: Arthropoda
- Class: Insecta
- Order: Lepidoptera
- Family: Gelechiidae
- Genus: Athrips
- Species: A. nigrogrisea

Binomial name
- Athrips nigrogrisea (Kolmakova, 1958)

Synonyms
- Gelechia nigrogrisea Kolmakova, 1958

Species of moth

Athrips nigrogrisea is a moth of the family Gelechiidae. It is found in Russia (Buryatia).

The wingspan is 10–11 mm. Adults are on wing from early June to mid-July.

The larvae feed on Malus baccata and Malus domestica.
