= Athrips septempunctata =

Scientific classification
- Domain: Eukaryota
- Kingdom: Animalia
- Phylum: Arthropoda
- Class: Insecta
- Order: Lepidoptera
- Family: Gelechiidae
- Genus: Athrips
- Species: A. septempunctata

Binomial name
- Athrips septempunctata Li & Zheng, 1998

Species of moth

Athrips septempunctata is a moth of the family Gelechiidae. It is found in China (Gansu).

The wingspan is 16.5–17.5 mm.
