= Athrips helicaula =

Scientific classification
- Kingdom: Animalia
- Phylum: Arthropoda
- Class: Insecta
- Order: Lepidoptera
- Family: Gelechiidae
- Genus: Athrips
- Species: A. helicaula

Binomial name
- Athrips helicaula (Meyrick, 1912)

Synonyms
- Paltodora helicaula Meyrick, 1912; Pyncostola helicaula

Species of moth

Athrips helicaula is a moth of the family Gelechiidae. It is found in South Africa, where it has been recorded from the Northern Cape.

The wingspan is about 14 mm. The forewings are white, tinged with brownish and irrorated with blackish except on the costa and veins, which form undefined white streaks. The hindwings are light grey.
