= Athrips gussakovskii =

Scientific classification
- Domain: Eukaryota
- Kingdom: Animalia
- Phylum: Arthropoda
- Class: Insecta
- Order: Lepidoptera
- Family: Gelechiidae
- Genus: Athrips
- Species: A. gussakovskii

Binomial name
- Athrips gussakovskii (Gerasimov, 1930)

Synonyms
- Ziminiola gussakovskii Gerasimov, 1930; Rhynchopacha gussakovskii; Athrips gussakovskii gobica Emelyanov & Piskunov, 1982

Species of moth

Athrips gussakovskii is a moth of the family Gelechiidae. It is found in Uzbekistan, Mongolia and China (Ningxia).

The wingspan is 11–13.5 mm. Adults are on wing from July to August.
