= Athrips bidzilyai =

Scientific classification
- Kingdom: Animalia
- Phylum: Arthropoda
- Clade: Pancrustacea
- Class: Insecta
- Order: Lepidoptera
- Family: Gelechiidae
- Genus: Athrips
- Species: A. bidzilyai

Binomial name
- Athrips bidzilyai Junnilainen, 2010

Species of moth

Athrips bidzilyai is a moth of the family Gelechiidae. It is found in Russia (the southern Ural and southern Buryatia). The habitat consists of rocky steppe slopes and grassy lowland steppes.

The wingspan is 13–13.5 mm. Adults are on wing in the second half of June.

== Etymology ==
The species is named in honour of Dr. Oleksiy Bidzilya.
