= Athrips eugenii =

Scientific classification
- Domain: Eukaryota
- Kingdom: Animalia
- Phylum: Arthropoda
- Class: Insecta
- Order: Lepidoptera
- Family: Gelechiidae
- Genus: Athrips
- Species: A. eugenii

Binomial name
- Athrips eugenii Bidzilya, 2005

Species of moth

Athrips eugenii is a moth of the family Gelechiidae. It is found in Kyrgyzstan and Uzbekistan. The habitat consists of forest-steppes.

The wingspan is 14–17 mm. Adults are on wing in July.
