= Athrips sisterina =

Scientific classification
- Kingdom: Animalia
- Phylum: Arthropoda
- Clade: Pancrustacea
- Class: Insecta
- Order: Lepidoptera
- Family: Gelechiidae
- Genus: Athrips
- Species: A. sisterina

Binomial name
- Athrips sisterina (Povolný, 1989)

Synonyms
- Pseudathrips sisterina Povolný, 1989

Species of moth

Athrips sisterina is a moth of the family Gelechiidae. It is found in Saudi Arabia.
