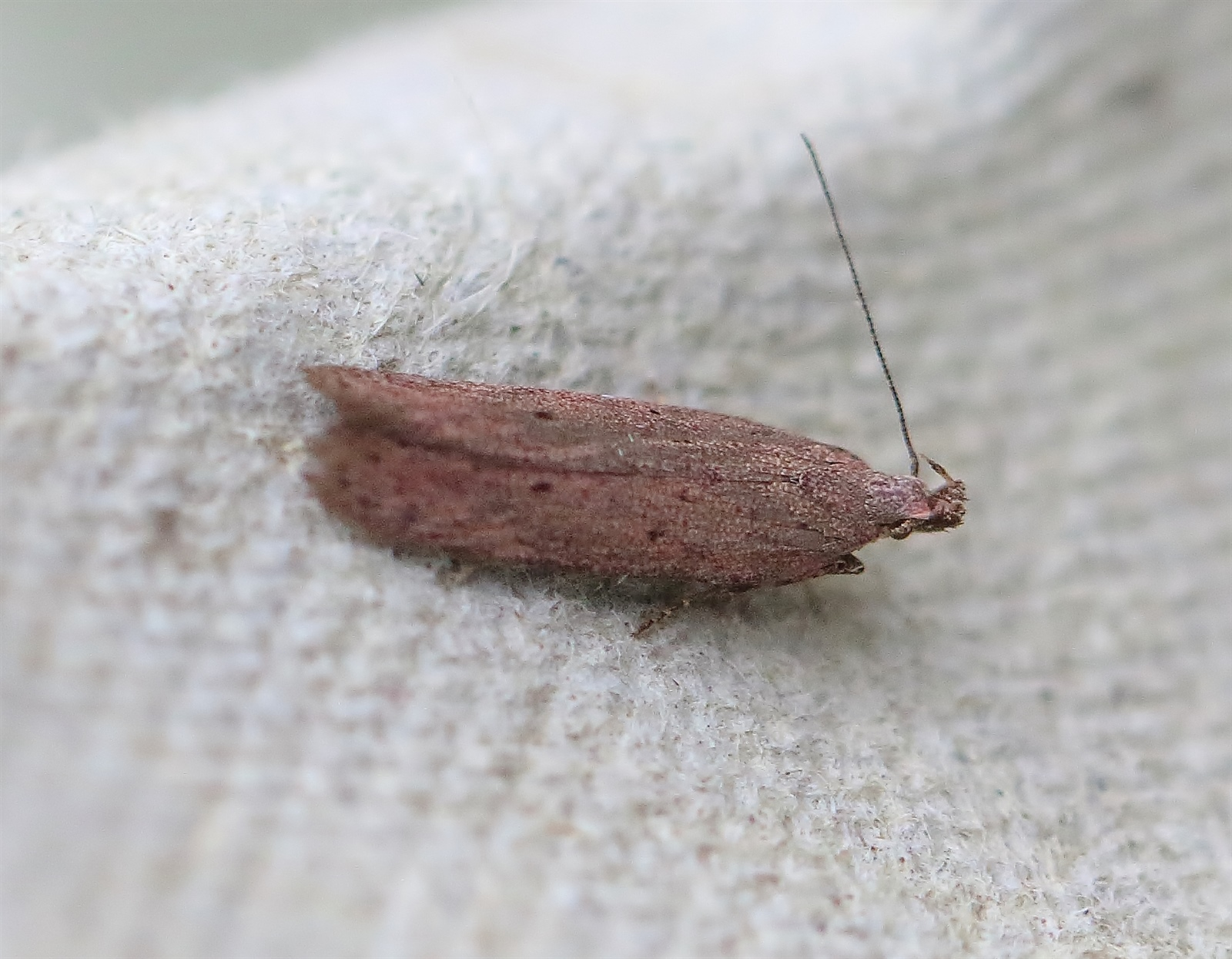

Scientific classification
- Kingdom: Animalia
- Phylum: Arthropoda
- Clade: Pancrustacea
- Class: Insecta
- Order: Lepidoptera
- Family: Gelechiidae
- Genus: Athrips
- Species: A. pruinosella

Binomial name
- Athrips pruinosella (Lienig & Zeller, 1846)

Synonyms
- Gelechia pruinosella Lienig & Zeller, 1846; Athrips pruinosellus

= Athrips pruinosella =

Species of moth

Athrips pruinosella is a moth of the family Gelechiidae. It is found in western and northern Europe. It has also been recorded from the Caucasus, the southern Ural Mountains, the Altai Mountains, Tuva, Buryatia, the Amur region, Primorye and North America.

The wingspan is 12–16 mm. Adults are on wing from the end of May to the beginning of August.

The larvae feed on Salix repens, Vaccinium uliginosum, Spiraea salicifolia, Andromeda polifolia and Vaccinium myrtillus.
