= Athrips adumbratella =

Scientific classification
- Kingdom: Animalia
- Phylum: Arthropoda
- Class: Insecta
- Order: Lepidoptera
- Family: Gelechiidae
- Genus: Athrips
- Species: A. adumbratella

Binomial name
- Athrips adumbratella (Snellen, 1884)

Synonyms
- Brachmia adumbratella Snellen, 1884

Species of moth

Athrips adumbratella is a moth of the family Gelechiidae. It is found in the Russian Far East.

The wingspan is about 16 mm. Adults are on wing at the end of May.
