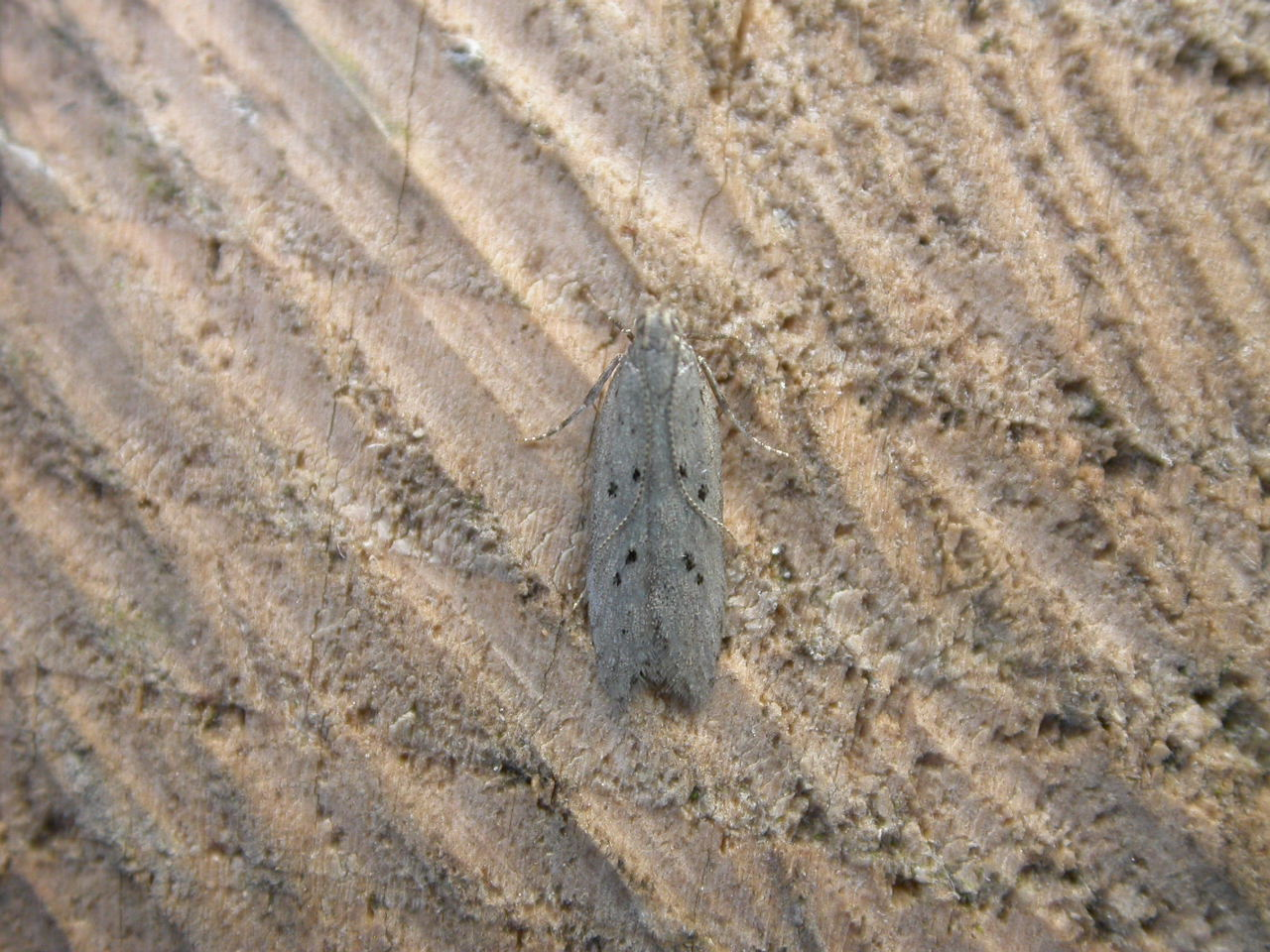

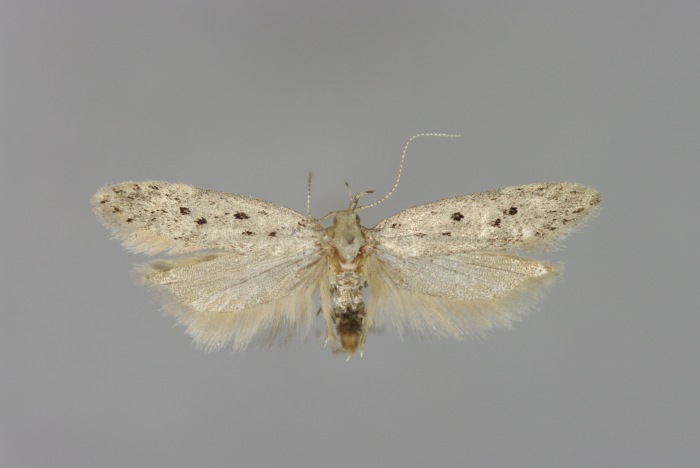

Scientific classification
- Kingdom: Animalia
- Phylum: Arthropoda
- Class: Insecta
- Order: Lepidoptera
- Family: Gelechiidae
- Genus: Athrips
- Species: A. mouffetella

Binomial name
- Athrips mouffetella (Linnaeus, 1758)

Synonyms
- Phalaena (Tinea) mouffetella Linnaeus, 1758; Tinea pedisequella Hübner, 1796; Recurvaria punctifera Haworth, 1828

= Athrips mouffetella =

Ten-spotted Honeysuckle Moth

Species of moth

Athrips mouffetella, the ten-spotted honeysuckle moth, is a moth of the family Gelechiidae. It is found from central and northern Europe to the Ural Mountains, Siberia and the Russian Far East. It has also been recorded from North America.

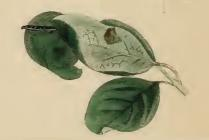
A sprig of honeysuckle eaten by larva

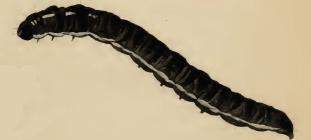
Larva

The wingspan is about 15 mm. The forewings are light ashy brown, irrorated with paler, faintly rosy-tinged hues. There are some minute black dots near the base and on termen. The stigmata and a dot obliquely beneath and before second discal are black, the first discal is beyond the plical. The hindwings are grey. The larva is blackish-grey; dorsal line whitish on incisions between 2 and 4; spiracular indistinct, whitish, clearer anteriorly; head and plate of 2 black.

The moths are on wing from June to August depending on the location.

The larvae feed on Lonicera species (including Lonicera periclymenum, Lonicera xylosteum and Lonicera caprifolium), but also Symphoricarpos albus.
