= Athrips nitrariella =

Scientific classification
- Domain: Eukaryota
- Kingdom: Animalia
- Phylum: Arthropoda
- Class: Insecta
- Order: Lepidoptera
- Family: Gelechiidae
- Genus: Athrips
- Species: A. nitrariella

Binomial name
- Athrips nitrariella (Chrétien, 1908)

Synonyms
- Epithectis nitrariella Chrétien, 1908

Species of moth

Athrips nitrariella is a moth of the family Gelechiidae. It is found in Algeria.

The wingspan is about 12 mm. Adults are on wing in September and from February to May.

The larvae feed on Nitraria tridentata.
