= Athrips tcharyna =

Scientific classification
- Domain: Eukaryota
- Kingdom: Animalia
- Phylum: Arthropoda
- Class: Insecta
- Order: Lepidoptera
- Family: Gelechiidae
- Genus: Athrips
- Species: A. tcharyna

Binomial name
- Athrips tcharyna Bidzilya, 2005

Species of moth

Athrips tcharyna is a moth of the family Gelechiidae. It is found in south-eastern Kazakhstan.

The wingspan is about 15 mm.
