= Athrips profusa =

Scientific classification
- Kingdom: Animalia
- Phylum: Arthropoda
- Class: Insecta
- Order: Lepidoptera
- Family: Gelechiidae
- Genus: Athrips
- Species: A. profusa

Binomial name
- Athrips profusa (Meyrick, 1921)

Synonyms
- Epithectis profusa Meyrick, 1921

Species of moth

Athrips profusa is a moth of the family Gelechiidae first described by Edward Meyrick in 1921. It is found in Zimbabwe.

The wingspan is about 13 mm. The forewings are pale ochreous with a rather thick grey streak along the costa throughout, narrowed towards the base and with an irregular whitish-grey streak within the cell from the base, branching around the margin, with inter-neural branches towards the costa. There is a whitish streak partially irrorated (sprinkled) with grey beneath the fold from the base to the plical stigma. There is some irregular light grey suffusion along the dorsum from one-third to near the tornus and there is a streak of grey suffusion parallel to the termen from the costa near the apex to the dorsum before tornus. There is also a black dot beneath the costal streak at one-third, as well as a black linear dot on the lower edge of the intracellular streak towards the base, and one on the upper edge of the subdorsal streak beyond this. The stigmata are black, the plical rather obliquely before the first discal, the second discal below the middle. Three or four black scales are found near the costa at five-sixths and some scattered grey and black scales along the dorsum. The hindwings are grey.
