= Athrips autumnella =

Scientific classification
- Kingdom: Animalia
- Phylum: Arthropoda
- Class: Insecta
- Order: Lepidoptera
- Family: Gelechiidae
- Genus: Athrips
- Species: A. autumnella

Binomial name
- Athrips autumnella Falkovitsh & Bidzilya, 2003

Species of moth

Athrips autumnella is a moth of the family Gelechiidae. It is found in Uzbekistan, Turkmenistan, Tadzhikistan and China (Inner Mongolia, Ningxia).

The wingspan is 12–16.5 mm.
