= Athrips maculata =

Scientific classification
- Domain: Eukaryota
- Kingdom: Animalia
- Phylum: Arthropoda
- Class: Insecta
- Order: Lepidoptera
- Family: Gelechiidae
- Genus: Athrips
- Species: A. maculata

Binomial name
- Athrips maculata Bidzilya & Li, 2009

Species of moth

Athrips maculata is a moth of the family Gelechiidae. It is found in south-eastern Kazakhstan and China (Gansu).

The wingspan is about 11 mm. Adults are on wing from May to June.

The larvae feed on Nitraria schoberi.
