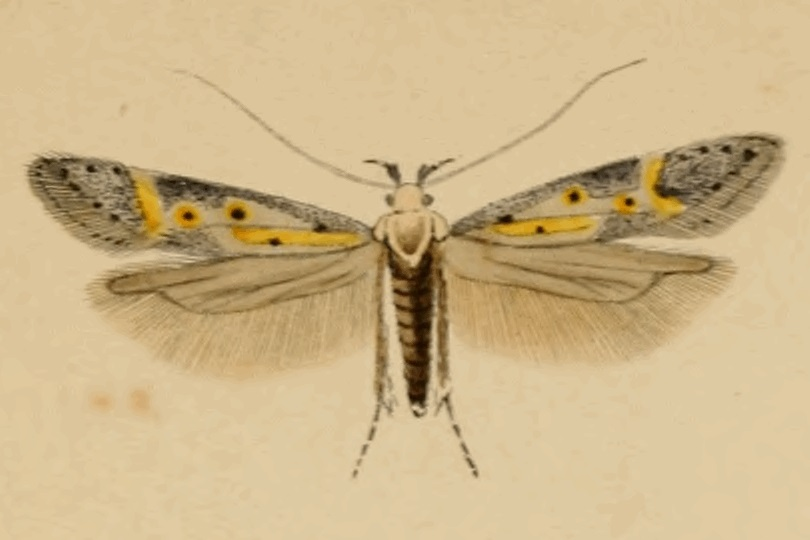

Scientific classification
- Domain: Eukaryota
- Kingdom: Animalia
- Phylum: Arthropoda
- Class: Insecta
- Order: Lepidoptera
- Family: Gelechiidae
- Genus: Athrips
- Species: A. nigricostella

Binomial name
- Athrips nigricostella (Duponchel, 1842)

Synonyms
- Lita nigricostella Duponchel, 1842

= Athrips nigricostella =

Species of moth

Athrips nigricostella is a moth of the family Gelechiidae. It is found in France, Germany, Poland, Austria, Switzerland, Italy, the Czech Republic, Slovakia, Slovenia, Hungary, Romania, Ukraine and Russia. It is also found in Turkey, Kazakhstan, Kyrgyzstan, the Russian Far East, China (Xinjiang) and Japan.

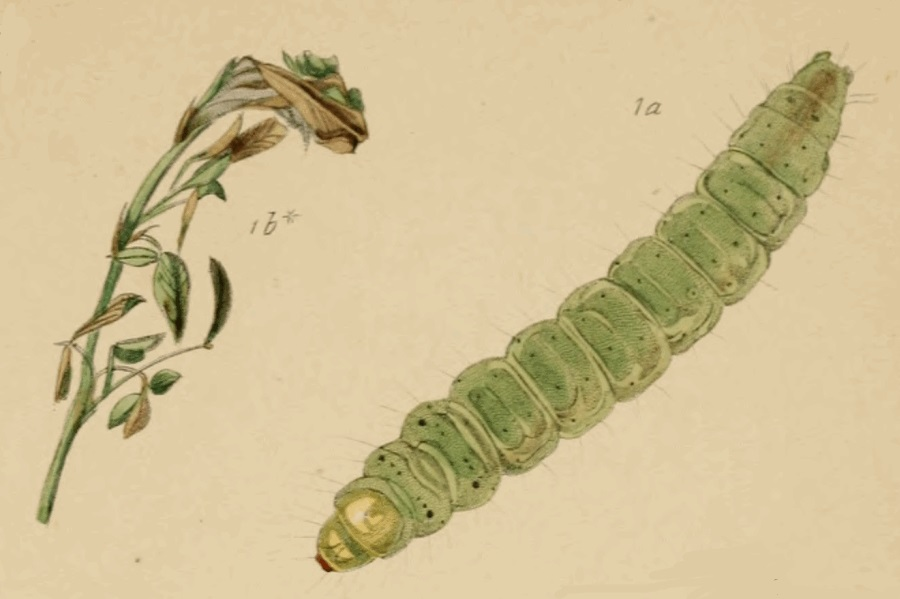
Larva and damage

The larvae feed on Medicago sativa and Medicago minima. They spin together the terminal leaves of their host plant. Pupation takes place in a white cocoon between the spun leaves.
