= Echidgnathia =

Scientific classification
- Kingdom: Animalia
- Phylum: Arthropoda
- Class: Insecta
- Order: Lepidoptera
- Family: Sesiidae
- Subfamily: Sesiinae
- Genus: Echidgnathia; Hampson, 1919

Species
- See text

Genus of moths

Echidgnathia is a genus of moths in the family Sesiidae.

== Species ==
- Echidgnathia khomasana de Freina, 2011
- Echidgnathia vitrifasciata (Hampson, 1910)
