= Athrips nigristriata =

Scientific classification
- Domain: Eukaryota
- Kingdom: Animalia
- Phylum: Arthropoda
- Class: Insecta
- Order: Lepidoptera
- Family: Gelechiidae
- Genus: Athrips
- Species: A. nigristriata

Binomial name
- Athrips nigristriata Bidzilya & Li, 2009

Species of moth

Athrips nigristriata is a moth of the family Gelechiidae. It is found in China (Ningxia).

The wingspan is about 12 mm. Adults are on wing at the end of June.

== Etymology ==
The species name refers to the wing pattern and is derived from the Latin prefix nigr- (meaning black) and Latin striatus (meaning streak).
