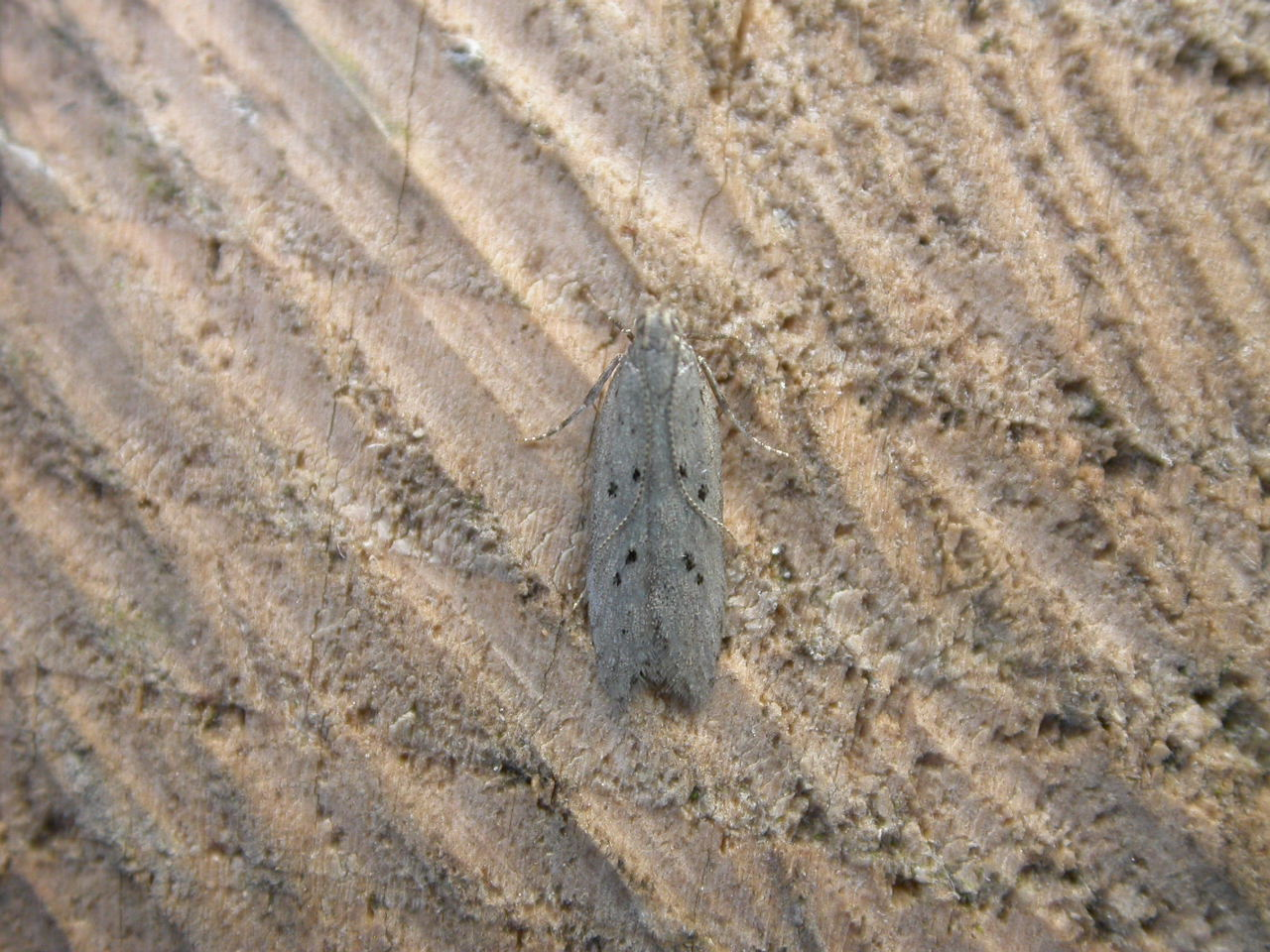
- Athrips mouffetella

Scientific classification
- Domain: Eukaryota
- Kingdom: Animalia
- Phylum: Arthropoda
- Class: Insecta
- Order: Lepidoptera
- Family: Gelechiidae
- Tribe: Gelechiini
- Genus: Athrips; Billberg, 1820

Synonyms
- Cremona Busck, 1934; Epithectis Meyrick, 1895; Leobatus Walsingham, 1904; Rhynchopacha Staudinger, 1871; Ziminiola Gerasimov, 1930

= Athrips =

Genus of moths

Athrips is a genus of moths in the family Gelechiidae.

== Species ==
- tigrina species-group
  - Athrips tigrina (Christoph, 1877)
- nitrariella species-group
  - Athrips bidilatata Li & Zheng, 1998
  - Athrips maculata Bidzilya & Li, 2009
  - Athrips mongolorum Piskunov, 1980
  - Athrips neimongolica Bidzilya & Li, 2009
  - Athrips nitrariella (Chrétien, 1908)
- gussakovskii species-group
  - Athrips autumnella Falkovitsh & Bidzilya, 2003
  - Athrips carthaginella (Lucas, 1940)
  - Athrips gussakovskii (Gerasimov, 1930)
- thymifoliella species-group
  - Athrips thymifoliella (Constant, 1893)
- nigricostella species-group
  - Athrips amoenella (Frey, 1882)
  - Athrips kerzhneri Piskunov, 1990
  - Athrips nigricostella (Duponchel, 1842)
  - Athrips rutjani Bidzilya, 2005
  - Athrips stepposa Bidzilya, 2005
  - Athrips tetrapunctella (Thunberg, 1794)
- falkovitshi species-group
  - Athrips falkovitshi Piskunov, 1990
- fagoniae species-group
  - Athrips fagoniae (Walsingham, 1904)
- gerasimovi species-group
  - Athrips gerasimovi Piskunov, 1982
- septempunctata species-group
  - Athrips peteri Bidzilya, 2005
  - Athrips septempunctata Li & Zheng, 1998
  - Athrips tcharyna Bidzilya, 2005
- tsaidamica species-group
  - Athrips tsaidamica Emelyanov & Piskunov, 1982
- pruinosella species-group
  - Athrips adumbratella (Snellen, 1884)
  - Athrips eugenii Bidzilya, 2005
  - Athrips gansuensis Bidzilya & Li, 2009
  - Athrips huangshana Bidzilya & Li, 2009
  - Athrips kostjuki Bidzilya, 2005
  - Athrips medjella (Chretien, 1900)
  - Athrips montana Bidzilya & Li, 2009
  - Athrips mouffetella (Linnaeus, 1758)
  - Athrips nigristriata Bidzilya & Li, 2009
  - Athrips nigrogrisea (Kolmakova, 1958)
  - Athrips patockai (Povolny, 1979)
  - Athrips polymaculella Park, 1991
  - Athrips pruinosella (Lienig & Zeller, 1846)
  - Athrips rancidella (Herrich-Schaffer, 1854)
  - Athrips ravida Bidzilya & Li, 2009
  - Athrips sibirica Bidzilya, 2005
  - Athrips spiraeae (Staudinger, 1871)
- Unnplaced to species-group
  - Athrips albibasella Bidzilya, 2010
  - Athrips albicostella Bidzilya, 2010
  - Athrips angustisaccula Bidzilya, 2010
  - Athrips aquila Junnilainen, 2010
  - Athrips asarinella (Chretien, 1930)
  - Athrips bruneosparsa (Janse, 1958)
  - Athrips bidzilyai Junnilainen, 2010
  - Athrips cretulata (Meyrick, 1927)
  - Athrips dorsimaculata Bidzilya, 2010
  - Athrips flavida Bidzilya, 2010
  - Athrips helicaula (Meyrick, 1912)
  - Athrips hirtopalpa Bidzilya, 2010
  - Athrips irritans (Povolný, 1989)
  - Athrips latipalpella Bidzilya, 2010
  - Athrips mappigera (Meyrick, 1914)
  - Athrips meyi Bidzilya, 2010
  - Athrips neograpta (Meyrick, 1914)
  - Athrips nigrinervosa Bidzilya, 2010
  - Athrips pallida Bidzilya, 2010
  - Athrips phaeomicta (Meyrick, 1936)
  - Athrips phoenaula (Meyrick, 1913)
  - Athrips profusa (Meyrick, 1921)
  - Athrips ptychophora (Meyrick, 1914)
  - Athrips punctosa Bidzilya, 2010
  - Athrips ravidinigra Bidzilya, 2010
  - Athrips sisterina (Povolný, 1989)
  - Athrips studiosa (Meyrick, 1905)
  - Athrips syncopaula (Meyrick, 1937)
  - Athrips telifera (Meyrick, 1910)
  - Athrips zetterstedtiella (Zeller, 1852)
  - Athrips zophochalca (Meyrick, 1918)
