= Athrips telifera =

Scientific classification
- Kingdom: Animalia
- Phylum: Arthropoda
- Class: Insecta
- Order: Lepidoptera
- Family: Gelechiidae
- Genus: Athrips
- Species: A. telifera

Binomial name
- Athrips telifera (Meyrick, 1910)

Synonyms
- Epithectis telifera Meyrick, 1910

Species of moth

Athrips telifera is a moth of the family Gelechiidae. It is found in India (the Himalayas).

The wingspan is about 13 mm. The forewings are whitish, with some scattered fuscous and dark fuscous specks. There is a line of blackish irroration along the fold from one-fourth of the wing to beyond the middle and a similar line from the middle of the disc to the apex. The hindwings are grey-whitish.
