= Athrips tsaidamica =

Scientific classification
- Kingdom: Animalia
- Phylum: Arthropoda
- Clade: Pancrustacea
- Class: Insecta
- Order: Lepidoptera
- Family: Gelechiidae
- Genus: Athrips
- Species: A. tsaidamica

Binomial name
- Athrips tsaidamica Emelyanov & Piskunov, 1982

Species of moth

Athrips tsaidamica is a moth of the family Gelechiidae. It is found in China (Quinghai, Inner Mongolia).

The wingspan is about 19 mm. Adults are on wing in May and July.
