= Athrips gansuensis =

Scientific classification
- Domain: Eukaryota
- Kingdom: Animalia
- Phylum: Arthropoda
- Class: Insecta
- Order: Lepidoptera
- Family: Gelechiidae
- Genus: Athrips
- Species: A. gansuensis

Binomial name
- Athrips gansuensis Bidzilya & Li, 2009

Species of moth

Athrips gansuensis is a moth of the family Gelechiidae. It is found in China (Gansu).

The wingspan is about 18 mm.
