= Phlyctaenogastra =

Scientific classification
- Domain: Eukaryota
- Kingdom: Animalia
- Phylum: Arthropoda
- Class: Insecta
- Order: Lepidoptera
- Superfamily: Noctuoidea
- Family: Erebidae
- Subfamily: Arctiinae
- Subtribe: Spilosomina
- Genus: Phlyctaenogastra; Gaede, 1915

Genus of moths

Phlyctaenogastra is a genus of moths in the family Erebidae erected by Max Gaede in 1915.

== Species ==
The genus consists of three species:

- Phlyctaenogastra rangei Gaede, 1915
- Phlyctaenogastra britae Kühne, 2010
- Phlyctaenogastra familia Kühne, 2010
