= Conopobathra =

Scientific classification
- Kingdom: Animalia
- Phylum: Arthropoda
- Class: Insecta
- Order: Lepidoptera
- Family: Gracillariidae
- Subfamily: Gracillariinae
- Genus: Conopobathra; Vári, 1961

Species
- See text

Genus of moths

Conopobathra is a genus of moths in the family Gracillariidae.

== Species ==
- Conopobathra carbunculata (Meyrick, 1912)
- Conopobathra geraea Vári, 1961
- Conopobathra gravissima (Meyrick, 1912)
- Conopobathra plethorhabda Vári, 1961
