= Athrips medjella =

Scientific classification
- Kingdom: Animalia
- Phylum: Arthropoda
- Clade: Pancrustacea
- Class: Insecta
- Order: Lepidoptera
- Family: Gelechiidae
- Genus: Athrips
- Species: A. medjella

Binomial name
- Athrips medjella (Chrétien, 1900)

Synonyms
- Brachmia medjella Chrétien, 1900

Species of moth

Athrips medjella is a moth of the family Gelechiidae. It is found in southern France.

The wingspan is about 14 mm. Adults are on wing in July.

The larvae feed on Cotoneaster integerrimus.
