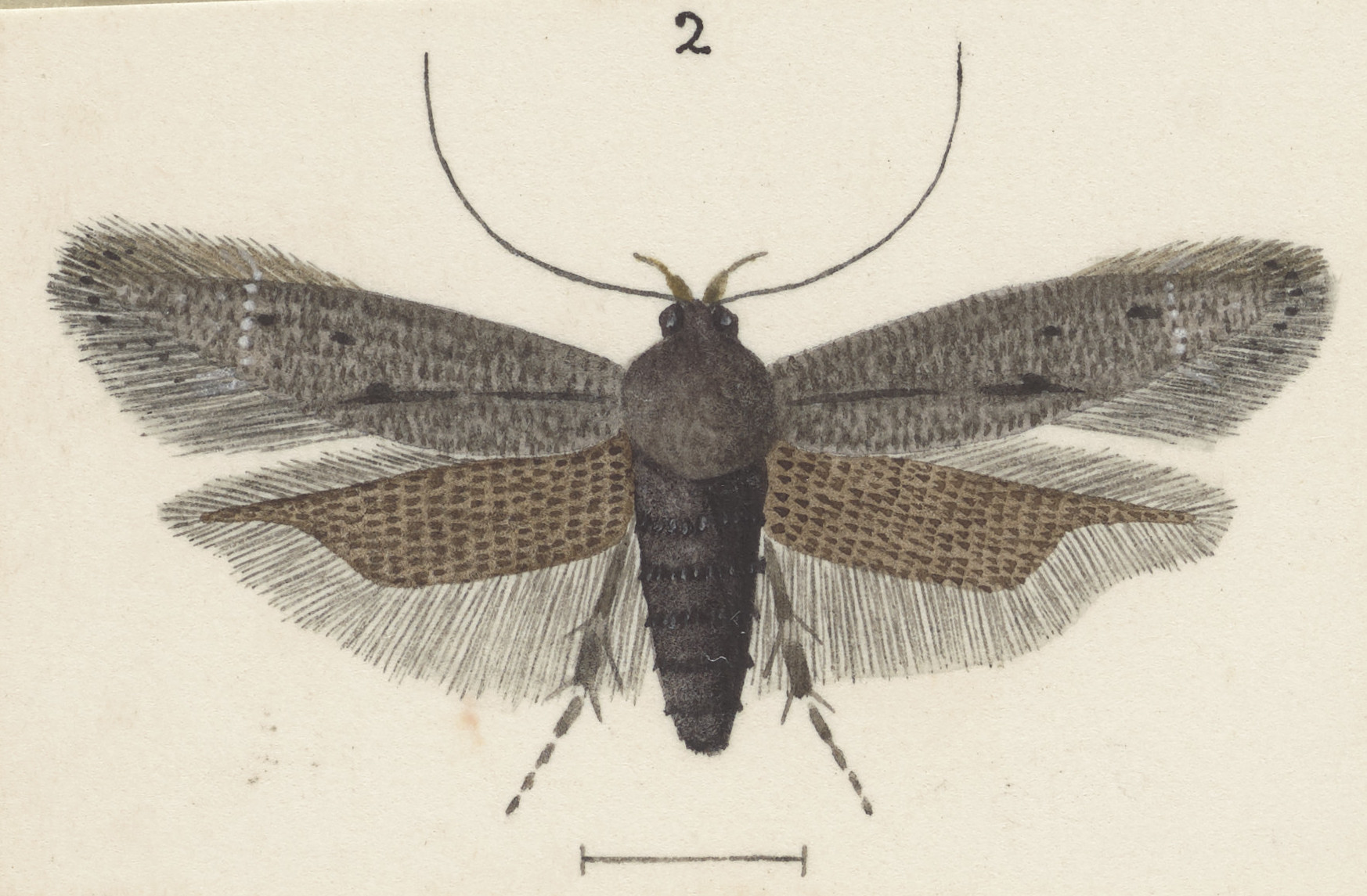
- Illustration of male
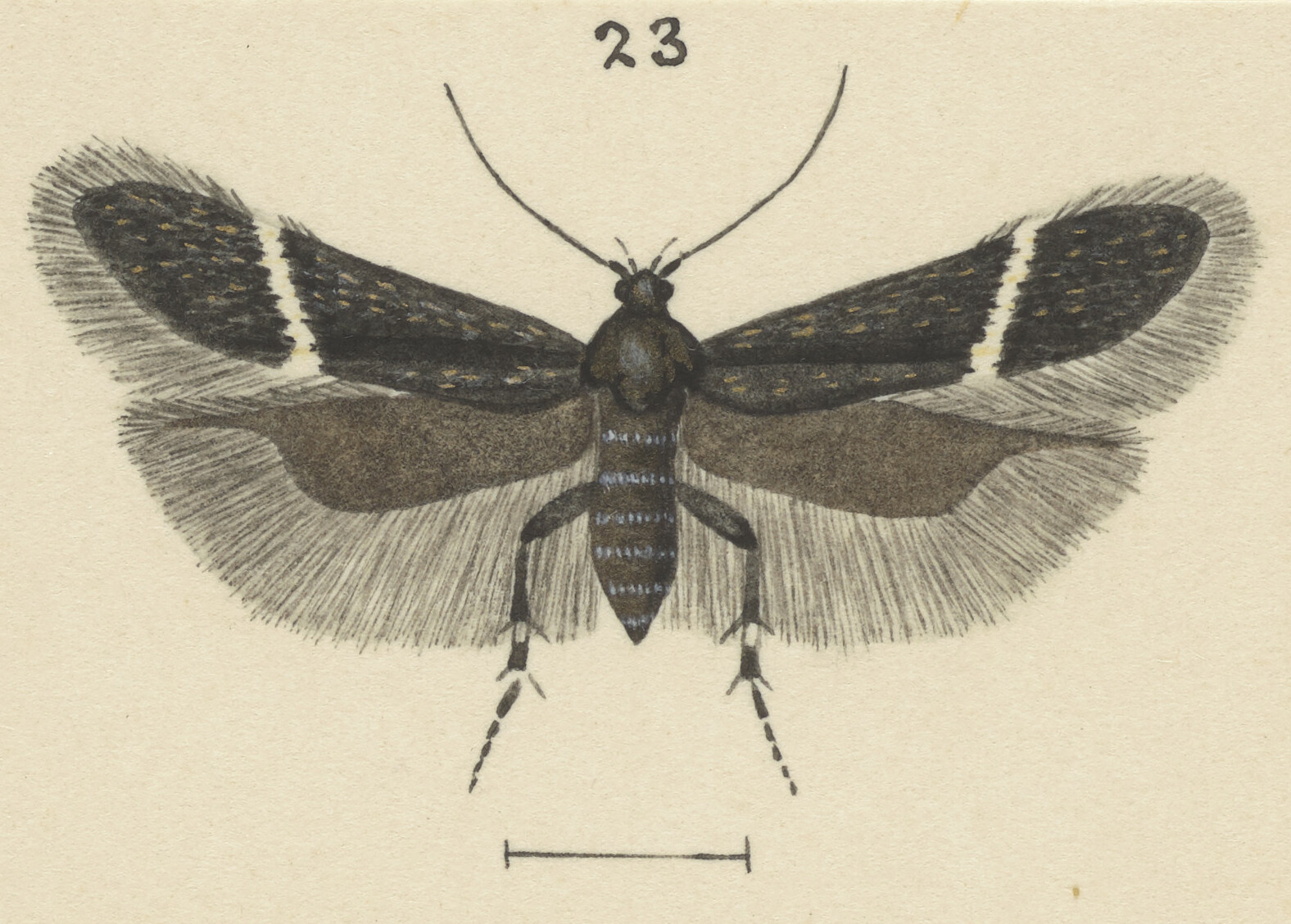
- Illustration of female

Scientific classification
- Domain: Eukaryota
- Kingdom: Animalia
- Phylum: Arthropoda
- Class: Insecta
- Order: Lepidoptera
- Family: Gelechiidae
- Genus: Athrips
- Species: A. zophochalca

Binomial name
- Athrips zophochalca (Meyrick, 1918)

Synonyms
- Epithectis zophochalca Meyrick, 1918; Epithectis transversella Hudson, 1939; Athrips transversella (Hudson, 1939)

= Athrips zophochalca =

Species of moth

Athrips zophochalca is a moth of the family Gelechiidae. It was described by Edward Meyrick in 1918 and is endemic to New Zealand. A. zophochalca has been observed in both the North and South Islands as well as at the Poor Knights. The species inhabits scrubby native forest, saline wetlands and braided river habitat. Larvae bore into the terminal shoots of Carmichaelia species. Adults are on the wing from November until March and are sexually dimorphic with the male lacking the white band on the forewings.

== Taxonomy ==
A. zophochalca was first described by Edward Meyrick in 1918 using a specimen collected by George Hudson in Auckland and named Epithectis zophochalca. In 1939 Hudson, thinking he was describing a new species, named it Epithectis transversella. In 1978 Klaus Sattler placed A. zophochalca into the genus Athrips. J. S. Dugdale synonymised that A. transversella into A. zophochalca in 1988. However the placement of this species within the genus Athrips is in doubt. As a result, this species is sometimes referred to as Athrips (s.l.) zophochalca. The male holotype is held at the Natural History Museum, London.

== Description ==
Meyrick described the species as follows:

♂. 9 mm. Head shining bronzy - metallic. Palpi whitish-bronzy, second joint hardly rough beneath, anterior edge of terminal joint dark fuscous. Thorax purplish-bronzy-fuscous. Abdomen dark fuscous. Forewings lanceolate; glossy rather dark bronzy-fuscous; stigmata blackish, plical obliquely before first discal; small cloudy whitish spots on costa before 3/4 and on tornus slightly anterior to this, on one wing connected by a faint straight whitish shade : cilia fuscous, round apex with a dark-fuscous antemedian line. Hindwings with apex considerably produced; dark fuscous; a fine longitudinal hyaline line in disc : cilia fuscous.

Hudson described the female of the species under the name Epithectis transversella as follows:

The expansion of the wings is nearly 3/8 inch (9 mm.). The fore-wings are rather elongate, with the apex and tornus rounded; black, sparsely sprinkled with dull bronzy-grey scales; a very conspicuous, rather narrow, oblique, snow-white band from 2/3 costa to before tornus; cilia grey. Hind-wings with apex extremely pointed and termen suddenly bowed, dark blackish grey; cilia dark grey. Head, thorax and abdomen black.

The adult specimens of this species are sexually dimorphic with the female having a white band of the forewings that the male lacks.

== Distribution ==
This species is endemic to New Zealand. Other than the type locality of Auckland this species has also been observed at the Poor Knights Islands as well as in the Tasman, Canterbury and Otago regions.

== Habitat and hosts ==
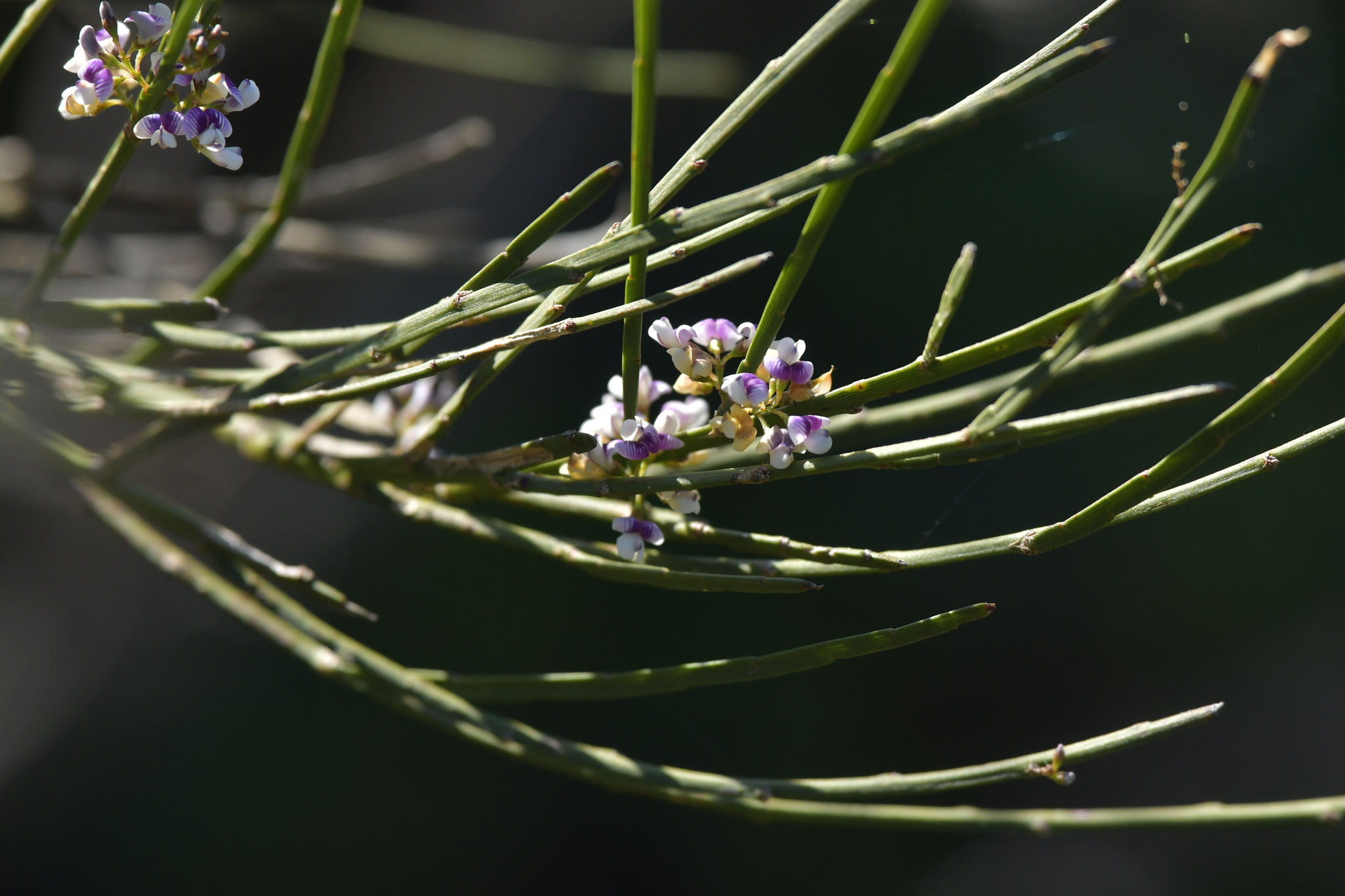
Likely larval host Carmichaelia australis.

This species inhabits scrubby native forest, saline wetlands and braided river habitat. Larvae of this species bore into the terminal shoots of Carmichaelia species including Carmichaelia appressa. Adults of this species have been observed flying over Carmichaelia australis.

== Behaviour ==
Adults of this species have been observed on the wing from November until March.
