= Athrips neimongolica =

Scientific classification
- Domain: Eukaryota
- Kingdom: Animalia
- Phylum: Arthropoda
- Class: Insecta
- Order: Lepidoptera
- Family: Gelechiidae
- Genus: Athrips
- Species: A. neimongolica

Binomial name
- Athrips neimongolica Bidzilya & Li, 2009

Species of moth

Athrips neimongolica is a moth of the family Gelechiidae. It is found in China (Inner Mongolia).

The wingspan is 10–12 mm.
