= Athrips peteri =

Scientific classification
- Kingdom: Animalia
- Phylum: Arthropoda
- Clade: Pancrustacea
- Class: Insecta
- Order: Lepidoptera
- Family: Gelechiidae
- Genus: Athrips
- Species: A. peteri

Binomial name
- Athrips peteri Bidzilya, 2005

Species of moth

Athrips peteri is a moth of the family Gelechiidae. It is found in Kazakhstan and China (Inner Mongolia).

The wingspan is about 15 mm.
