= Athrips tigrina =

Scientific classification
- Domain: Eukaryota
- Kingdom: Animalia
- Phylum: Arthropoda
- Class: Insecta
- Order: Lepidoptera
- Family: Gelechiidae
- Genus: Athrips
- Species: A. tigrina

Binomial name
- Athrips tigrina (Christoph, 1877)

Synonyms
- Teleia tigrina Christoph, 1877; Athrips agnathos Li & Zheng, 1998

Species of moth

Athrips tigrina is a moth of the family Gelechiidae. It is found in Turkmenistan, Uzbekistan, China (Ningxia, Xinjiang) and Mongolia. The habitat consists of deserts.

The wingspan is 11–17 mm. Adults are on wing from the end of June to the end of September.
