= Athrips kostjuki =

Scientific classification
- Kingdom: Animalia
- Phylum: Arthropoda
- Class: Insecta
- Order: Lepidoptera
- Family: Gelechiidae
- Genus: Athrips
- Species: A. kostjuki

Binomial name
- Athrips kostjuki Bidzilya, 2005

Species of moth

Athrips kostjuki is a moth of the family Gelechiidae. It is found in Russia (Tuva). The habitat consists of semi-deserts.

The wingspan is 15–16 mm.
