= Athrips ravida =

Scientific classification
- Domain: Eukaryota
- Kingdom: Animalia
- Phylum: Arthropoda
- Class: Insecta
- Order: Lepidoptera
- Family: Gelechiidae
- Genus: Athrips
- Species: A. ravida

Binomial name
- Athrips ravida Bidzilya & Li, 2009

Species of moth

Athrips ravida is a moth of the family Gelechiidae. It is found in China (Ningxia).

The wingspan is 15–18 mm. Adults are on wing from June to August.
