= Athrips phaeomicta =

Scientific classification
- Kingdom: Animalia
- Phylum: Arthropoda
- Clade: Pancrustacea
- Class: Insecta
- Order: Lepidoptera
- Family: Gelechiidae
- Genus: Athrips
- Species: A. phaeomicta

Binomial name
- Athrips phaeomicta (Meyrick, 1936)

Synonyms
- Epithectis phaeomicta Meyrick, 1936

Species of moth

Athrips phaeomicta is a moth of the family Gelechiidae. It is found in the Democratic Republic of Congo (Equateur).
