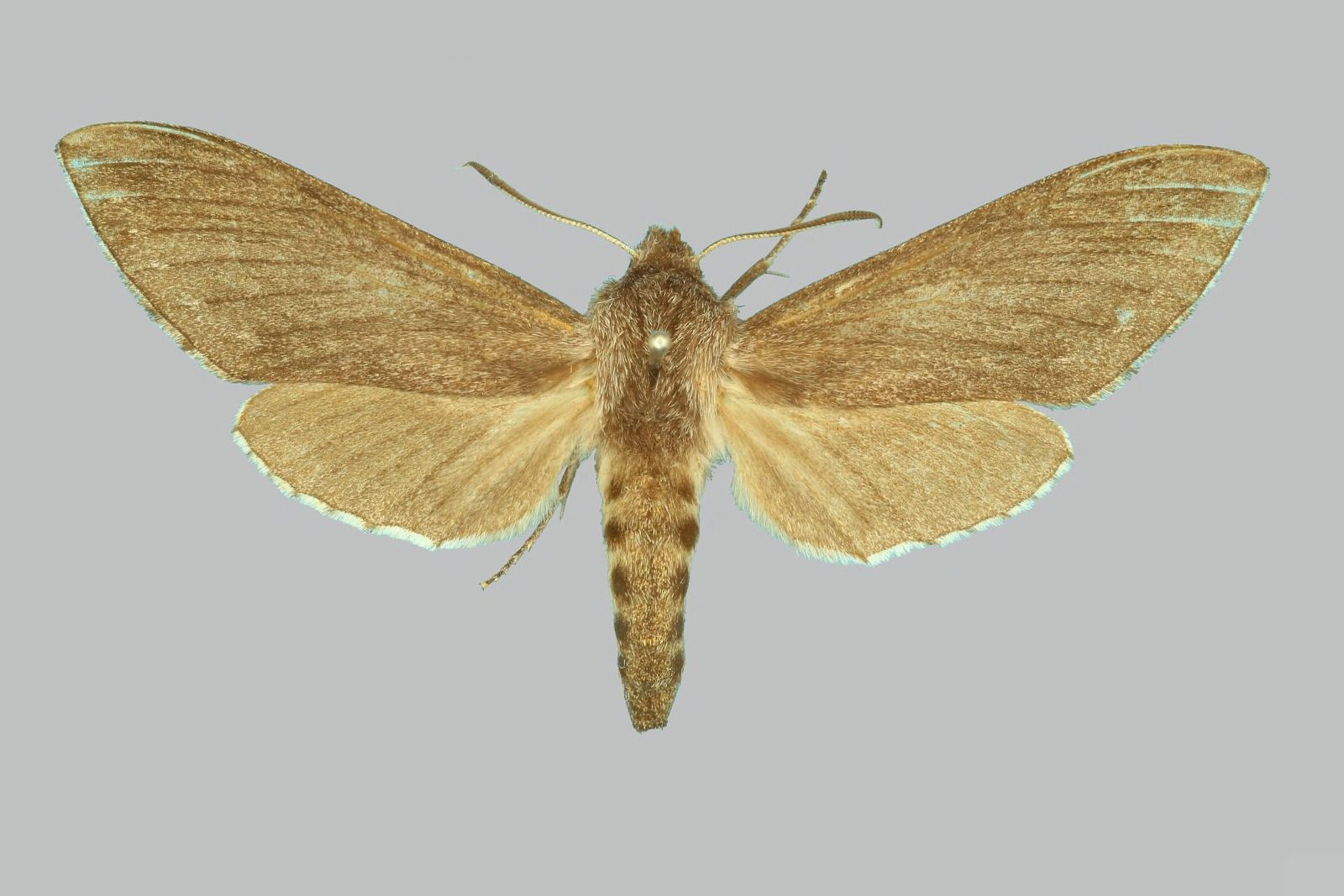
- Hoplistopus penricei

Scientific classification
- Domain: Eukaryota
- Kingdom: Animalia
- Phylum: Arthropoda
- Class: Insecta
- Order: Lepidoptera
- Family: Sphingidae
- Tribe: Sphingini
- Genus: Hoplistopus; Rothschild & Jordan, 1903

= Hoplistopus =

Genus of moths

Hoplistopus is a genus of moths in the family Sphingidae. The genus was erected by Walter Rothschild and Karl Jordan in 1903.

== Species ==
- Hoplistopus butti (Rothschild & Jordan 1903)
- Hoplistopus penricei (Rothschild & Jordan 1903)
