= Paratemelia =

Scientific classification
- Kingdom: Animalia
- Phylum: Arthropoda
- Clade: Pancrustacea
- Class: Insecta
- Order: Lepidoptera
- Family: Lypusidae
- Subfamily: Lypusinae
- Genus: Paratemelia; Lvovsky, 2007

Type species
- Paratemelia namibiella Lvovsky, 2007

Species
- Numerous, see text

Genus of moths

Paratemelia is a genus of gelechioid moths. In the systematic layout used here, it is placed in the subfamily Amphisbatinae of the concealer moth family (Oecophoridae). Delimitation of Amphisbatinae versus the close relatives Depressariinae and Oecophorinae is a major problem of Gelechioidea taxonomy and systematics, and some authors separate the former two as full-blown families, and/or include the Amphisbatinae in Depressariinae (or Depressariidae), or merge them in the Oecophorinae outright.

== Selected species ==
- Paratemelia meyi Lvovsky, 2007
- Paratemelia namibiella Lvovsky, 2007
