= Paratelphusa =

Scientific classification
- Domain: Eukaryota
- Kingdom: Animalia
- Phylum: Arthropoda
- Class: Insecta
- Order: Lepidoptera
- Family: Gelechiidae
- Subfamily: Gelechiinae
- Genus: Paratelphusa; Janse, 1958

Genus of moths

Paratelphusa is a genus of moths in the family Gelechiidae.

== Species ==
- Paratelphusa griseoptera Janse, 1958
- Paratelphusa reducta Janse, 1958
