= Owambarctia =

Scientific classification
- Domain: Eukaryota
- Kingdom: Animalia
- Phylum: Arthropoda
- Class: Insecta
- Order: Lepidoptera
- Superfamily: Noctuoidea
- Family: Erebidae
- Subfamily: Arctiinae
- Tribe: Syntomini
- Genus: Owambarctia; Kiriakoff, 1957

Genus of moths

Owambarctia is a genus of moths in the family Erebidae.

== Species ==
- Owambarctia owamboensis Kiriakoff, 1957
- Owambarctia unipuncta Kiriakoff, 1973
