= Athrips bidilatata =

Scientific classification
- Domain: Eukaryota
- Kingdom: Animalia
- Phylum: Arthropoda
- Class: Insecta
- Order: Lepidoptera
- Family: Gelechiidae
- Genus: Athrips
- Species: A. bidilatata

Binomial name
- Athrips bidilatata Bidzilya & Li, 2009

Species of moth

Athrips bidilatata is a moth of the family Gelechiidae. It is found in China (Gansu).

The wingspan is about 11.5 mm. Adults are on wing in September and from February to May.
