= Athrips syncopaula =

Scientific classification
- Kingdom: Animalia
- Phylum: Arthropoda
- Class: Insecta
- Order: Lepidoptera
- Family: Gelechiidae
- Genus: Athrips
- Species: A. syncopaula

Binomial name
- Athrips syncopaula (Meyrick, 1937)

Synonyms
- Gelechia syncopaula Meyrick, 1937

Species of moth

Athrips syncopaula is a moth of the family Gelechiidae. It is found in South Africa.

The wingspan is about 16 mm.
