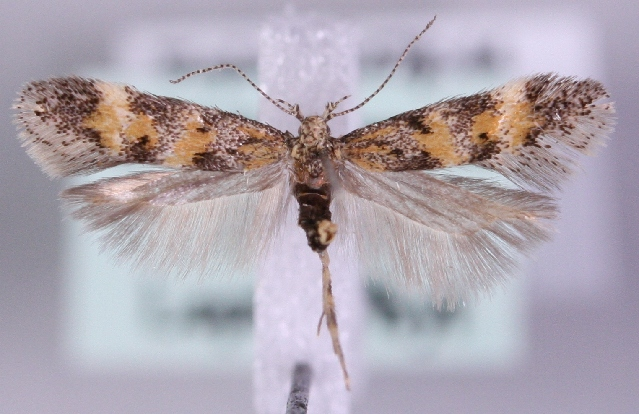

Scientific classification
- Kingdom: Animalia
- Phylum: Arthropoda
- Class: Insecta
- Order: Lepidoptera
- Family: Gelechiidae
- Genus: Athrips
- Species: A. amoenella

Binomial name
- Athrips amoenella (Frey, 1882)

Synonyms
- Gelechia amoenella Frey, 1882; Athrips allgunnensis Svensson, 1993

= Athrips amoenella =

Species of moth

Athrips amoenella is a moth of the family Gelechiidae. It is found in Finland, Sweden, France, Spain, Austria, Switzerland, Italy, Slovakia, Hungary, Greece, Ukraine and Russia, as well as on Corsica. Outside of Europe, it is found in Turkey, Kazakhstan and Kyrgyzstan.

The wingspan is 9–11 mm. Adults are on wing from May to July. The ground colour of the forewings is whitish-yellow with ochreous brown and dark grey markings. The hindwings are dark grey.

The larvae possibly feed on Vicia cracca.
