= Owambarctia unipuncta =

Scientific classification
- Kingdom: Animalia
- Phylum: Arthropoda
- Class: Insecta
- Order: Lepidoptera
- Superfamily: Noctuoidea
- Family: Erebidae
- Subfamily: Arctiinae
- Genus: Owambarctia
- Species: O. unipuncta

Binomial name
- Owambarctia unipuncta Kiriakoff, 1973

Species of moth

Owambarctia unipuncta is a moth of the family Erebidae. It was described by Sergius G. Kiriakoff in 1973. It is found in Tanzania.
