= Athrips rutjani =

Scientific classification
- Domain: Eukaryota
- Kingdom: Animalia
- Phylum: Arthropoda
- Class: Insecta
- Order: Lepidoptera
- Family: Gelechiidae
- Genus: Athrips
- Species: A. rutjani

Binomial name
- Athrips rutjani Bidzilya, 2005

Species of moth

Athrips rutjani is a moth of the family Gelechiidae. It is found in Kyrgyzstan.

The wingspan is 10.5–12.5 mm. The hindwings are grey. Adults are on wing in early May.
