= Athrips mappigera =

Scientific classification
- Kingdom: Animalia
- Phylum: Arthropoda
- Class: Insecta
- Order: Lepidoptera
- Family: Gelechiidae
- Genus: Athrips
- Species: A. mappigera

Binomial name
- Athrips mappigera (Meyrick, 1914)

Synonyms
- Parapsectris mappigera Meyrick, 1914

Species of moth

Athrips mappigera is a moth of the family Gelechiidae first described by Edward Meyrick in 1914. It is found in Mozambique, Namibia and South Africa.

The wingspan is 10–11 mm. The forewings are brown, more or less sprinkled with blackish and with a broad band of blackish suffusion sprinkled with grey whitish along the costa from the base to two-thirds, cut by a narrow oblique white fascia sprinkled with black from the costa at one-fourth, which reaches to about the fold, and is surrounded on its lower portion by raised spots of blackish suffusion, of which the posterior represents the plical stigma. The discal stigmata are represented by similar raised spots, the first slightly beyond the plical, the second almost resting on a triangular blackish dorsal spot before the tornus. There are also some undefined groups of blackish scales along the termen. The hindwings are grey.
