= Athrips phoenaula =

Scientific classification
- Kingdom: Animalia
- Phylum: Arthropoda
- Clade: Pancrustacea
- Class: Insecta
- Order: Lepidoptera
- Family: Gelechiidae
- Genus: Athrips
- Species: A. phoenaula

Binomial name
- Athrips phoenaula (Meyrick, 1913)

Synonyms
- Gelechia phoenaula Meyrick, 1913

Species of moth

Athrips phoenaula is a moth of the family Gelechiidae first described by Edward Meyrick in 1913. It is found in Zimbabwe, Namibia and South Africa.

The wingspan is 13–14 mm (0.51–0.55 in). The forewings are deep yellow ochreous with a slender white streak along the costa from near the base to three-fourths, edged beneath by a few black scales. The margins of the cell, veins 1b and 7–11 marked with thick crimson-grey streaks, on the lower angle of the cell projecting suffusedly to the tornus. Veins 4–6 are marked with fine lines and there is a black dot beneath the fold at one-fourth. The stigmata are small, black, with the plical somewhat before the first discal. There are some obscure blackish dots on the posterior part of the costa and termen. The hindwings are grey, lighter towards the base.
