= Conopobathra carbunculata =

Scientific classification
- Kingdom: Animalia
- Phylum: Arthropoda
- Class: Insecta
- Order: Lepidoptera
- Family: Gracillariidae
- Genus: Conopobathra
- Species: C. carbunculata

Binomial name
- Conopobathra carbunculata (Meyrick, 1912)

Synonyms
- Acrocercops carbunculata Meyrick, 1912

Species of moth

Conopobathra carbunculata is a moth of the family Gracillariidae. It is known from South Africa, Namibia and Zimbabwe.
