= Athrips flavida =

Scientific classification
- Kingdom: Animalia
- Phylum: Arthropoda
- Class: Insecta
- Order: Lepidoptera
- Family: Gelechiidae
- Genus: Athrips
- Species: A. flavida

Binomial name
- Athrips flavida Bidzilya, 2010

Species of moth in the family Gelechiidae from southern Africa

Athrips flavida is a moth of the family Gelechiidae. It is found in Namibia, Angola, Nigeria and South Africa.
