= Phlyctaenogastra familia =

Scientific classification
- Domain: Eukaryota
- Kingdom: Animalia
- Phylum: Arthropoda
- Class: Insecta
- Order: Lepidoptera
- Superfamily: Noctuoidea
- Family: Erebidae
- Subfamily: Arctiinae
- Genus: Phlyctaenogastra
- Species: P. familia

Binomial name
- Phlyctaenogastra familia Kühne, 2010

Species of moth

Phlyctaenogastra familia is a moth in the family Erebidae. It was described by Lars Kühne in 2010. It is known from Namibia.
