= Conopobathra plethorhabda =

Scientific classification
- Kingdom: Animalia
- Phylum: Arthropoda
- Class: Insecta
- Order: Lepidoptera
- Family: Gracillariidae
- Genus: Conopobathra
- Species: C. plethorhabda

Binomial name
- Conopobathra plethorhabda Vári, 1961

Species of moth

Conopobathra plethorhabda is a moth of the family Gracillariidae. It is known from Namibia.
