= Probatostola =

Scientific classification
- Kingdom: Animalia
- Phylum: Arthropoda
- Clade: Pancrustacea
- Class: Insecta
- Order: Lepidoptera
- Family: Tineidae
- Subfamily: Myrmecozelinae
- Genus: Probatostola; Meyrick, 1926
- Species: P. ochromalla

Binomial name
- Probatostola ochromalla Meyrick, 1926

Genus of moths

Probatostola is a genus of moths belonging to the family Tineidae. It contains only one species, Probatostola ochromalla, which is found in Namibia.
