= Phyllonorycter chionopa =

Scientific classification
- Kingdom: Animalia
- Phylum: Arthropoda
- Clade: Pancrustacea
- Class: Insecta
- Order: Lepidoptera
- Family: Gracillariidae
- Genus: Phyllonorycter
- Species: P. chionopa

Binomial name
- Phyllonorycter chionopa (Vári, 1961)

Synonyms
- Lithocolletis chionopa Vári, 1961

Species of moth

Phyllonorycter chionopa is a moth of the family Gracillariidae. It is known from Namibia. The habitat consists of sandy floodplains and rocky slopes along dry river beds with dominant trees as Acacia montis-usti and Commiphora species.

The length of the forewings is 3 mm. The forewings are elongate and the ground colour is golden yellow with white markings consisting of a broad, irregularly shaped basal streak, two broad, costal, patch-like strigulae, and two dorsal patch-like strigulae. The hindwings are uniformly white. Adults are probably on wing from October to late November or early December.
