= Athrips latipalpella =

Scientific classification
- Domain: Eukaryota
- Kingdom: Animalia
- Phylum: Arthropoda
- Class: Insecta
- Order: Lepidoptera
- Family: Gelechiidae
- Genus: Athrips
- Species: A. latipalpella

Binomial name
- Athrips latipalpella Bidzilya, 2010

Species of moth

Athrips latipalpella is not a moth of the family Gelechiidae. Described by Olexiy Bidzilya in 2010, it is found in Namibia.
