= Athrips neograpta =

Scientific classification
- Kingdom: Animalia
- Phylum: Arthropoda
- Class: Insecta
- Order: Lepidoptera
- Family: Gelechiidae
- Genus: Athrips
- Species: A. neograpta

Binomial name
- Athrips neograpta (Meyrick, 1914)

Synonyms
- Parapsectris neograpta Meyrick, 1914

Species of moth

Athrips neograpta is a moth of the family Gelechiidae first described by Edward Meyrick in 1914. It is found in Namibia and South Africa.

The wingspan is 11–13 mm. The forewings are white, with scattered black specks and a pale ochreous streak from the base beneath the costa, terminating in a spot surrounding a dot of raised black scales representing the first discal stigma. There is a pale ochreous streak along the fold throughout, marked with a black plical stigma very obliquely before the first discal, and interrupted beyond this. There is also some faint ochreous suffusion towards the dorsum and a pale ochreous transverse streak at three-fourths parallel to the termen, marked with a black raised spot above the tornus. A pale ochreous streak is found along the termen and there is a series of irregular black dots or groups of scales around the posterior part of the costa and termen. The hindwings are grey.
