= Phyllonorycter didymopa =

Scientific classification
- Kingdom: Animalia
- Phylum: Arthropoda
- Class: Insecta
- Order: Lepidoptera
- Family: Gracillariidae
- Genus: Phyllonorycter
- Species: P. didymopa

Binomial name
- Phyllonorycter didymopa (Vári, 1961)

Synonyms
- Lithocolletis didymopa Vári, 1961

Species of moth

Phyllonorycter didymopa is a moth of the family Gracillariidae. It is known from South Africa and Namibia.

The length of the forewings is 2.9–3.2 mm. Specimens were reared from mines collected in mid-January and mid-March.

The larvae feed on Dombeya rotundifolia. They mine the leaves of their host plant. Later it creates a gall-like swelling near the base of the disc.
