= Athrips angustisaccula =

Scientific classification
- Kingdom: Animalia
- Phylum: Arthropoda
- Clade: Pancrustacea
- Class: Insecta
- Order: Lepidoptera
- Family: Gelechiidae
- Genus: Athrips
- Species: A. angustisaccula

Binomial name
- Athrips angustisaccula Bidzilya, 2010

Species of moth

Athrips angustisaccula is a moth of the family Gelechiidae. It is found in Zimbabwe.
