= Athrips dorsimaculata =

Scientific classification
- Domain: Eukaryota
- Kingdom: Animalia
- Phylum: Arthropoda
- Class: Insecta
- Order: Lepidoptera
- Family: Gelechiidae
- Genus: Athrips
- Species: A. dorsimaculata

Binomial name
- Athrips dorsimaculata Bidzilya, 2010

Species of moth

Athrips dorsimaculata is a moth of the family Gelechiidae. It is found in Namibia.
