= Scythris stagnosa =

Scientific classification
- Kingdom: Animalia
- Phylum: Arthropoda
- Class: Insecta
- Order: Lepidoptera
- Family: Scythrididae
- Genus: Scythris
- Species: S. stagnosa

Binomial name
- Scythris stagnosa Meyrick, 1913

Synonyms
- Scythris vulgata Meyrick, 1914

Species of moth

Scythris stagnosa is a moth of the family Scythrididae. It was described by Edward Meyrick in 1913. It is found in Kenya, Namibia and South Africa (Gauteng).

The wingspan is 9–10 mm. The forewings are ochreous whitish or pale whitish ochreous with the costal edge grey towards the base. The hindwings are grey.
