= Athrips bruneosparsa =

Scientific classification
- Domain: Eukaryota
- Kingdom: Animalia
- Phylum: Arthropoda
- Class: Insecta
- Order: Lepidoptera
- Family: Gelechiidae
- Genus: Athrips
- Species: A. bruneosparsa

Binomial name
- Athrips bruneosparsa (Janse, 1958)

Synonyms
- Parapsectris bruneosparsa Janse, 1958

Species of moth

Athrips bruneosparsa is a moth of the family Gelechiidae. It is found in Namibia.
