= Echidgnathia khomasana =

Scientific classification
- Kingdom: Animalia
- Phylum: Arthropoda
- Class: Insecta
- Order: Lepidoptera
- Family: Sesiidae
- Genus: Echidgnathia
- Species: E. khomasana

Binomial name
- Echidgnathia khomasana de Freina, 2011

Species of moth

Echidgnathia khomasana is a moth of the family Sesiidae. It is known from Namibia.
