= Conopobathra gravissima =

Scientific classification
- Kingdom: Animalia
- Phylum: Arthropoda
- Class: Insecta
- Order: Lepidoptera
- Family: Gracillariidae
- Genus: Conopobathra
- Species: C. gravissima

Binomial name
- Conopobathra gravissima (Meyrick, 1912)

Synonyms
- Acrocercops gravissima Meyrick, 1912; Conopobathra globulifera Meyrick, 1931

Species of moth

Conopobathra gravissima is a moth of the family Gracillariidae. It is known from India, Indonesia (Java), Malaysia (Selangor), the Bismarck Archipelago, Thailand, South Africa, Kenya, Namibia and Zimbabwe.

The larvae feed on Bauhinia species, including Bauhinia variegata. They probably mine the leaves of their host plant.
