= Phyllonorycter grewiaecola =

Scientific classification
- Kingdom: Animalia
- Phylum: Arthropoda
- Class: Insecta
- Order: Lepidoptera
- Family: Gracillariidae
- Genus: Phyllonorycter
- Species: P. grewiaecola

Binomial name
- Phyllonorycter grewiaecola (Vári, 1961)

Synonyms
- Lithocolletis grewiaecola Vári, 1961

Species of moth

Phyllonorycter grewiaecola is a moth of the family Gracillariidae. It is known from Namibia, South Africa, Zimbabwe and Kenya. The habitat consists of savannah areas at altitudes between 470 and 920 meters (1,540 and 3,020 ft).

The length of the forewings is 2.4–2.6 mm (0.094–0.102 in). Adults are on wing from February to August.

The larvae feed on Grewia kwebensis and Grewia tristis. They mine the leaves of their host plant.
