= Lecithocera ideologa =

Scientific classification
- Kingdom: Animalia
- Phylum: Arthropoda
- Class: Insecta
- Order: Lepidoptera
- Family: Lecithoceridae
- Genus: Lecithocera
- Species: L. ideologa

Binomial name
- Lecithocera ideologa Meyrick, 1937

Species of moth in the genus Lecithocera

Lecithocera ideologa is a moth in the family Lecithoceridae. It was described by Edward Meyrick in 1937. It is found in Mozambique, Namibia and South Africa.

The wingspan is about 15 mm.
