= Conopobathra geraea =

Scientific classification
- Kingdom: Animalia
- Phylum: Arthropoda
- Class: Insecta
- Order: Lepidoptera
- Family: Gracillariidae
- Genus: Conopobathra
- Species: C. geraea

Binomial name
- Conopobathra geraea Vári, 1961

Species of moth

Conopobathra geraea is a moth of the family Gracillariidae. It is known from South Africa and Namibia.
