= Paratemelia namibiella =

Scientific classification
- Kingdom: Animalia
- Phylum: Arthropoda
- Clade: Pancrustacea
- Class: Insecta
- Order: Lepidoptera
- Family: Lypusidae
- Genus: Paratemelia
- Species: P. namibiella

Binomial name
- Paratemelia namibiella Lvovsky, 2007

Species of moth

Paratemelia namibiella is a species of moth of the family Oecophoridae. It is primarily found in Namibia.
