= Owambarctia owamboensis =

Scientific classification
- Domain: Eukaryota
- Kingdom: Animalia
- Phylum: Arthropoda
- Class: Insecta
- Order: Lepidoptera
- Superfamily: Noctuoidea
- Family: Erebidae
- Subfamily: Arctiinae
- Genus: Owambarctia
- Species: O. owamboensis

Binomial name
- Owambarctia owamboensis Kiriakoff, 1957

Species of moth

Owambarctia owamboensis is a moth of the family Erebidae. It was described by Sergius G. Kiriakoff in 1957. It is found in Namibia.
