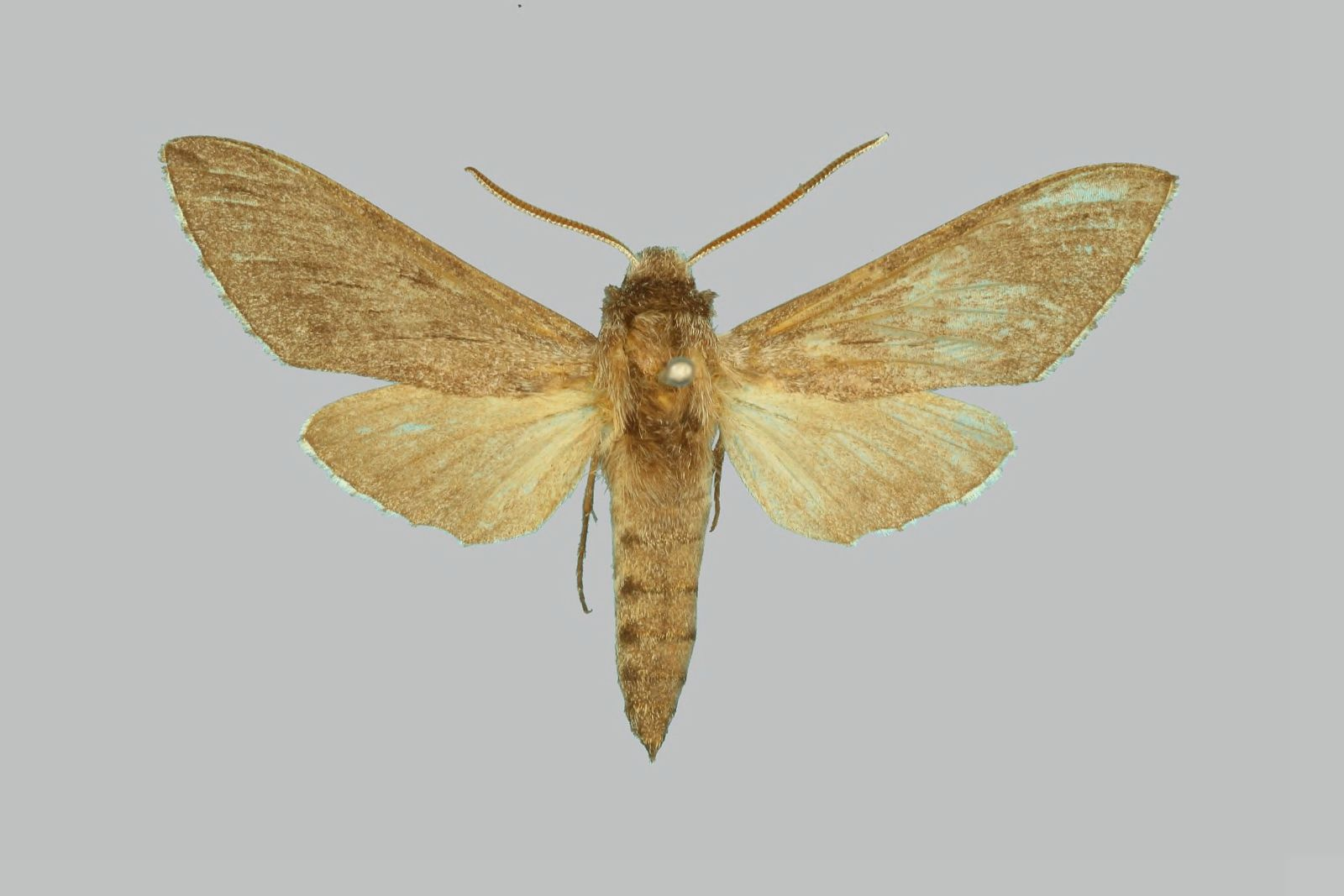

Scientific classification
- Kingdom: Animalia
- Phylum: Arthropoda
- Class: Insecta
- Order: Lepidoptera
- Family: Sphingidae
- Genus: Hoplistopus
- Species: H. penricei

Binomial name
- Hoplistopus penricei Rothschild & Jordan, 1903

= Hoplistopus penricei =

Species of moth

Hoplistopus penricei is a moth of the family Sphingidae. It is known from the Kalahari, south-western Africa and Angola.

The length of the forewings is about 24 mm.
