= Caloptilia isotoma =

Scientific classification
- Kingdom: Animalia
- Phylum: Arthropoda
- Class: Insecta
- Order: Lepidoptera
- Family: Gracillariidae
- Genus: Caloptilia
- Species: C. isotoma

Binomial name
- Caloptilia isotoma (Meyrick, 1914)

Synonyms
- Gracilaria isotoma Meyrick, 1914

Species of moth

Caloptilia isotoma is a moth of the family Gracillariidae. It is known from Nigeria, Namibia, Zimbabwe and South Africa.
