= Catascythris =

Scientific classification
- Kingdom: Animalia
- Phylum: Arthropoda
- Class: Insecta
- Order: Lepidoptera
- Family: Scythrididae
- Genus: Catascythris; Amsel, 1935
- Species: C. kebirella

Binomial name
- Catascythris kebirella Amsel, 1935

Synonyms
- Scythris kebirella

Genus of moths

Catascythris is a monotypic moth genus in the family Scythrididae described by Hans Georg Amsel in 1935. Its single species, Catascythris kebirella, described by the same author, is found in Israel, Iran, Oman, Saudi Arabia and Jordan.
