= Acrocercops terminalina =

Scientific classification
- Kingdom: Animalia
- Phylum: Arthropoda
- Class: Insecta
- Order: Lepidoptera
- Family: Gracillariidae
- Genus: Acrocercops
- Species: A. terminalina

Binomial name
- Acrocercops terminalina Vári, 1961

Species of moth

Acrocercops terminalina is a moth of the family Gracillariidae. It is known from South Africa, Namibia and Zimbabwe.

The larvae feed on Terminalia silozensis. They mine the leaves of their host plant.
