= Phlyctaenogastra rangei =

Scientific classification
- Domain: Eukaryota
- Kingdom: Animalia
- Phylum: Arthropoda
- Class: Insecta
- Order: Lepidoptera
- Superfamily: Noctuoidea
- Family: Erebidae
- Subfamily: Arctiinae
- Genus: Phlyctaenogastra
- Species: P. rangei

Binomial name
- Phlyctaenogastra rangei Gaede, 1915

Species of moth

Phlyctaenogastra rangei is a moth in the family Erebidae which was described by Max Gaede in 1915 and found in Namibia and South Africa.
