= Paratelphusa reducta =

Scientific classification
- Kingdom: Animalia
- Phylum: Arthropoda
- Clade: Pancrustacea
- Class: Insecta
- Order: Lepidoptera
- Family: Gelechiidae
- Genus: Paratelphusa
- Species: P. reducta

Binomial name
- Paratelphusa reducta Janse, 1958

Species of moth

Paratelphusa reducta is a moth in the family Gelechiidae. It was described by Anthonie Johannes Theodorus Janse in 1958. It is found in Namibia.
