= Acrocercops ficina =

Scientific classification
- Kingdom: Animalia
- Phylum: Arthropoda
- Class: Insecta
- Order: Lepidoptera
- Family: Gracillariidae
- Genus: Acrocercops
- Species: A. ficina

Binomial name
- Acrocercops ficina Vári, 1961

Species of moth

Acrocercops ficina is a moth of the family Gracillariidae. It is known from South Africa and Namibia.

The larvae feed on Ficus hippopotami, Ficus natalensis and Ficus trichopoda. They mine the leaves of their host plant.
