= Scythris rivigera =

Scientific classification
- Kingdom: Animalia
- Phylum: Arthropoda
- Class: Insecta
- Order: Lepidoptera
- Family: Scythrididae
- Genus: Scythris
- Species: S. rivigera

Binomial name
- Scythris rivigera Meyrick, 1911

Synonyms
- Scythris fluctuosa Meyrick, 1914; Scythris tenebrella Bengtsson, 2002

Species of moth

Scythris rivigera is a moth of the family Scythrididae. It was described by Edward Meyrick in 1911. It is found in Namibia, South Africa (Limpopo, Gauteng), Zimbabwe and Yemen.
