= Caloptilia cataractias =

Scientific classification
- Kingdom: Animalia
- Phylum: Arthropoda
- Class: Insecta
- Order: Lepidoptera
- Family: Gracillariidae
- Genus: Caloptilia
- Species: C. cataractias

Binomial name
- Caloptilia cataractias (Meyrick, 1921)

Synonyms
- Gracilaria cataractias Meyrick, 1921

Species of moth

Caloptilia cataractias is a moth of the family Gracillariidae. It is known from South Africa, Namibia and Zimbabwe.

The larvae feed on Rhynchosia caribaea. They mine the leaves of their host plant.
