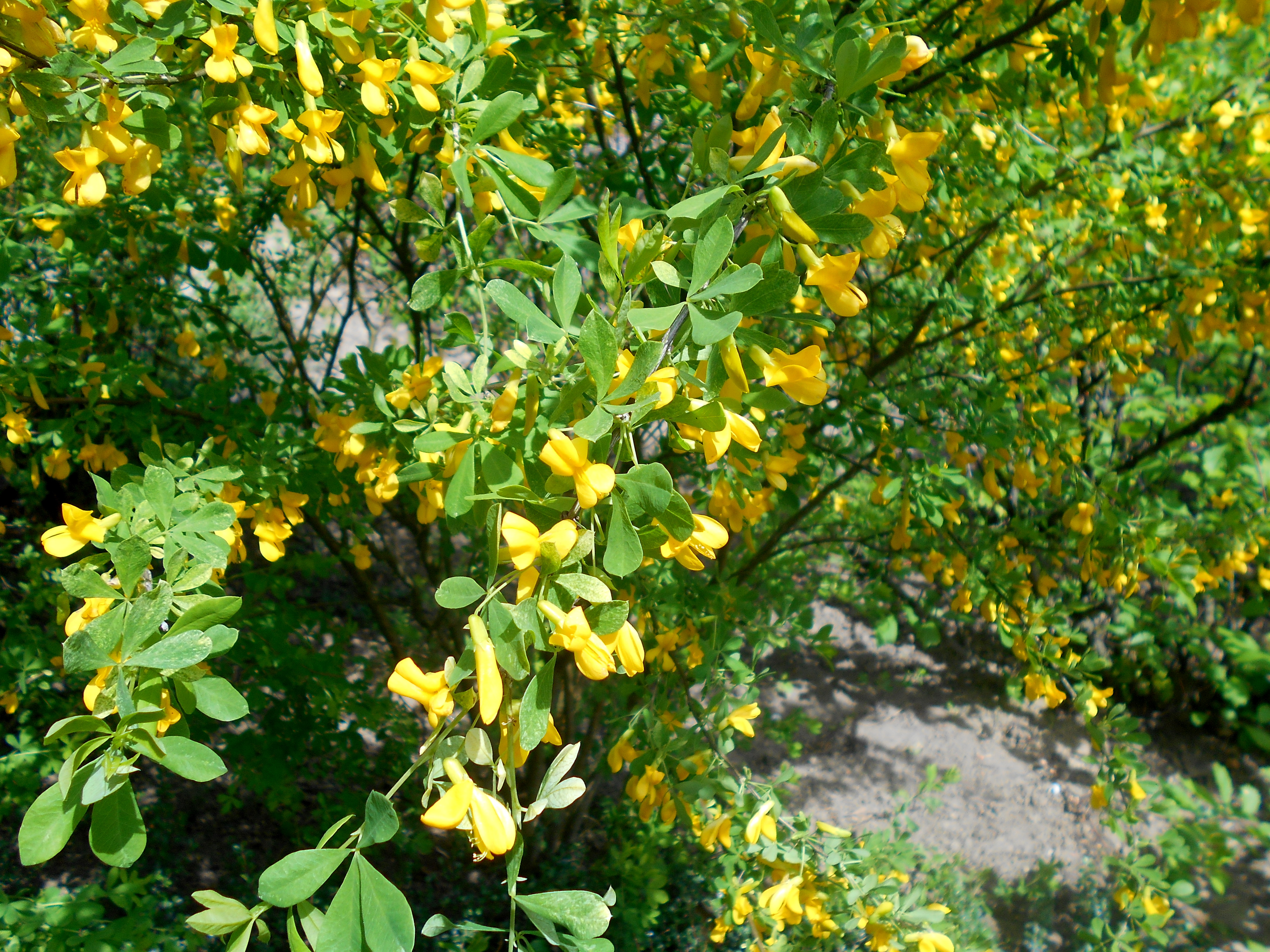

Scientific classification
- Kingdom: Plantae
- Clade: Tracheophytes
- Clade: Angiosperms
- Clade: Eudicots
- Clade: Rosids
- Order: Fabales
- Family: Fabaceae
- Subfamily: Faboideae
- Genus: Caragana
- Species: C. frutex

Binomial name
- Caragana frutex (L.) K.Koch

= Caragana frutex =

Species of legume

Caragana frutex is a species of flowering plant belonging to the family Fabaceae.

Its native range is Bulgaria to China.
