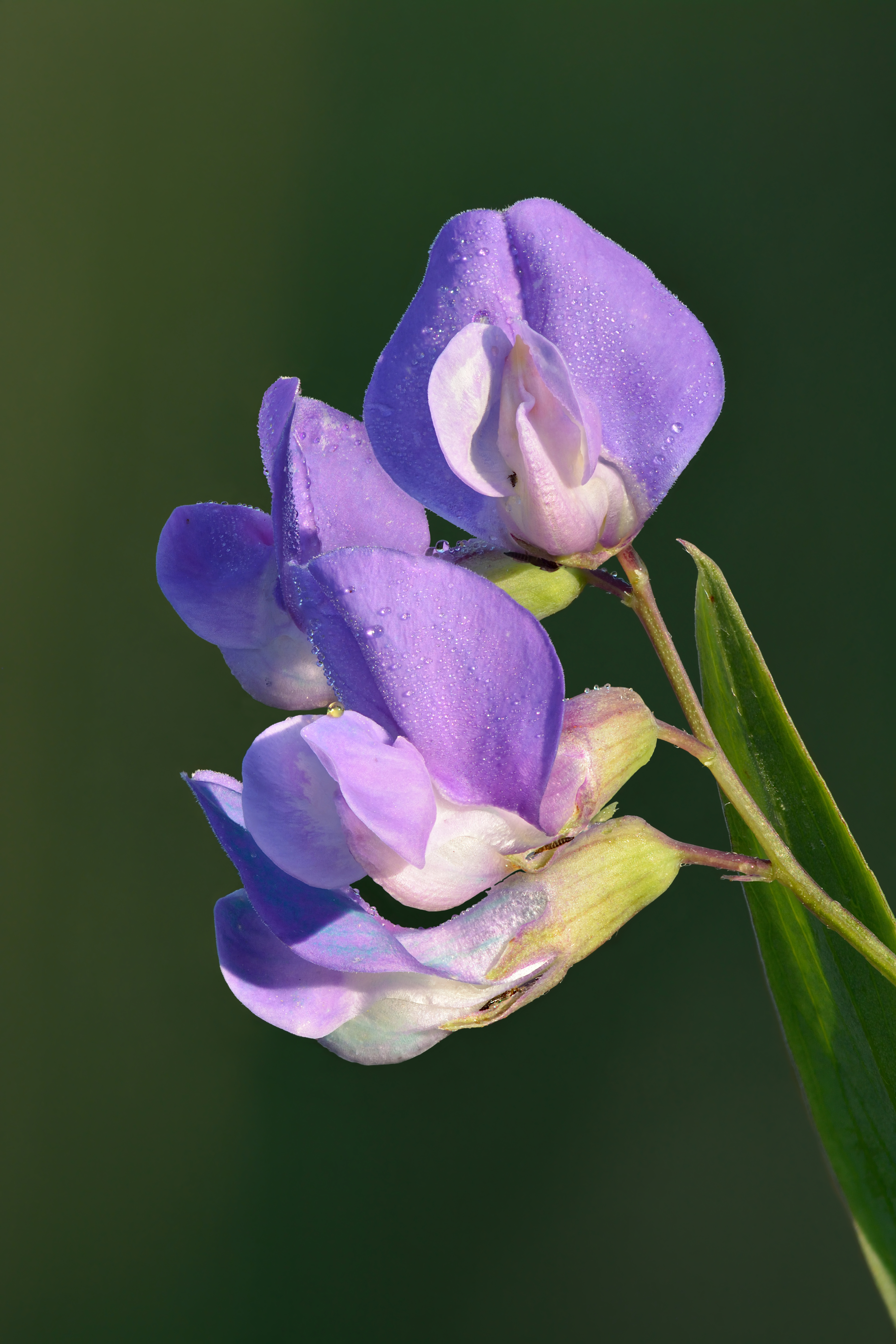

Scientific classification
- Kingdom: Plantae
- Clade: Tracheophytes
- Clade: Angiosperms
- Clade: Eudicots
- Clade: Rosids
- Order: Fabales
- Family: Fabaceae
- Subfamily: Faboideae
- Genus: Lathyrus
- Species: L. palustris

Binomial name
- Lathyrus palustris L.

Synonyms
- Lathyrus myrtifolius Orobus myrtifolius

= Lathyrus palustris =

Species of legume

Lathyrus palustris is a species of wild pea known by the common name marsh pea. It is native to Europe, Asia, and North America. It is a perennial herb with leaves made up of oval-shaped or oblong leaflets a few centimeters long. It has branched, coiled tendrils. The plant bears an inflorescence of two to eight pinkish purple pea flowers each up to two centimeters wide. The fruit is a dehiscent legume pod.

== Description ==
Lathyrus linifolius is a perennial plant with a sprawling or climbing stem that grows to 25 to 80 cm (10 to 31 in) and is shallowly-winged and nearly hairless. The leaves are alternate with short winged stalks and long narrow stipules. The leaf blades are pinnate with two to four pairs of narrow lanceolate leaflets, entire margins and a terminal branching tendril. The inflorescence has a long stem and two to eight purple flowers, each 12 to 20 mm (0.5 to 0.8 in) long. These have five sepals and five petals and are irregular. The uppermost petal is known as the "standard", the lateral two as the "wings" and the lowest two are joined to form the "keel". There are ten stamens and a single carpel. The fruit is a flat brown pod containing up to twelve seeds. This plant flowers in July and August.

== Distribution and habitat ==
Lathyrus linifolius is native to Europe, parts of Asia and North America. Its typical habitat is in rich ground and this plant is found in damp meadows, on river banks, on the margins of ponds, by lakes and near the sea, and occasionally in coastal hedgerows. It often seems to grow among reeds (Phragmites australis). The species epithet palustris is Latin for "of the marsh" and indicates its common habitat. Marsh Pea grows from long rhizomes that allows the plant to spread vegetatively. As the common name implies, Marsh Pea, it is found in wet to moist areas where it can receive adequate sun and also allows other plants to climb on.
