= List of moths of the United Arab Emirates =

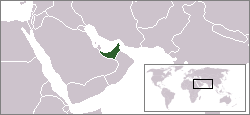
Location of the United Arab Emirates

Moths of the United Arab Emirates represent about 220 known moth species. The moths (mostly nocturnal) and butterflies (mostly diurnal) together make up the taxonomic order Lepidoptera.

This is a list of moth species which have been recorded from the United Arab Emirates.

== Autostichidae ==
- Turatia iranica Gozmány, 2000

== Batrachedridae ==
- Batrachedra amydraula Meyrick, 1916

== Brachodidae ==
- Nigilgia superbella (Rebel, 1907)

== Choreutidae ==
- Choreutis aegyptiaca (Zeller, 1867)

== Coleophoridae ==
- Coleophora albidorsella Toll, 1942
- Coleophora eilatica Baldizzone, 1994
- Coleophora fulgidella Too & Amsel, 1967
- Coleophora gymnocarpella Walsingham, 1907
- Coleophora jerusalemella Toll, 1942
- Coleophora lasloella Baldizzone, 1982
- Coleophora mausolella Chrétien, 1908
- Coleophora niphomesta Meyrick, 1917
- Coleophora nurmahal Toll, 1957
- Coleophora safadella van der Wolf, 2008
- Coleophora sudanella Rebel, 1916
- Coleophora versurella Zeller, 1849
- Coleophora viettella Toll, 1956
- Neoblastobasis eurotella Adamski, 2010

== Cosmopterigidae ==
- Alloclita cerritella (Riedl, 1993)
- Alloclita delozona Meyrick, 1919
- Anatrachyntis simplex (Walsingham, 1891)
- Anatrachyntis vanharteni Koster, 2010
- Ascalenia callynella Kasy, 1968
- Ascalenia kairaella Kasy, 1969
- Bifascioides leucomelanella (Rebel, 1917)
- Coccidiphila nivea Koster, 2010
- Cosmopterix crassicervicella Chrétien, 1896
- Eteobalea sumptuosella (Lederer, 1855)
- Gisilia gielisi Koster, 2010
- Gisilia sclerodes (Meyrick, 1909)
- Pseudascalenia riadella Kasy, 1968
- Pyroderces argentata Koster, 2010
- Pyroderces wolschrijni Koster & Sinev, 2003

== Crambidae ==
- Achyra ochrofascialis (Christoph, 1877)
- Aeschremon desertalis Asselbergs, 2008
- Aeschremon ochrealis Asselbergs, 2008
- Aeschremon similis Asselbergs, 2008
- Amselia heringi (Amsel, 1935)
- Ancylolomia micropalpella Amsel, 1951
- Antigastra catalaunalis (Duponchel, 1833)
- Autocharis fessalis (Swinhoe, 1886)
- Cnaphalocrocis poeyalis (Boisduval, 1833)
- Diaphana indica (Saunders, 1851)
- Duponchelia fovealis Zeller, 1847
- Emprepes flavomarginalis (Amsel, 1951)
- Epimetasia rufoarenalis (Rothschild, 1913)
- Euchromius ocellea (Haworth, 1811)
- Euchromius vinculellus (Zeller, 1847)
- Euclasta mirabilis Amsel, 1949
- Eurrhyparodes tricoloralis (Zeller, 1852)
- Evergestis desertalis (Hübner, 1813)
- Evergestis laristanalis Amsel, 1961
- Harpadispar diffusalis (Guenée, 1854)
- Heliothela ophideresana (Walker, 1863)
- Hellula undalis (Fabricius, 1781)
- Herpetogramma licarsisalis (Walker, 1859)
- Hymenoptychis sordida Zeller, 1852
- Leucinodes orbonalis Guenée, 1854
- Maruca vitrata (Fabricius, 1787)
- Nomophila noctuella ([Denis & Schiffermüller], 1775)
- Noorda blitealis Walker, 1859
- Palepicorsia ustrinalis (Christoph, 1877)
- Pediasia numidellus (Rebel, 1903)
- Piletocera opacalis Rebel, 1927
- Prionapteryx soudanensis (Hampson, 1919)
- Prionapteryx strioliger Rothschild, 1913
- Prochoristis rupicapralis (Lederer, 1855)
- Pyrausta panopealis (Walker, 1859)
- Spoladea recurvalis (Fabricius, 1775)
- Stiphrometasia monialis (Erschoff, 1872)
- Synclera traducalis (Zeller, 1852)
- Tegostoma comparalis (Hübner, 1796)

== Elachistidae ==
- Elachista densa Parenti, 1981
- Elachista veruta Kaila, 2008
- Ethmia alba (Amsel, 1949)
- Ethmia lecmima (Sattler, 1967)
- Ethmia lepidella (Chrétien, 1907)
- Ethmia quadrinotella (Mann, 1861)

== Geometridae ==
- Brachyglossina sciasmatica Brandt, 1941
- Cleora nana Hausmann & Skou, 2008
- Eupithecia mekrana Brandt, 1941
- Eupithecia ultimaria Boisduval, 1840
- Glossotrophia gracilis (Brandt, 1941)
- Hemidromodes sabulifera Prout, 1922
- Hemithea punctifimbria Warren, 1896
- Hyperythra swinhoei Butler, 1880
- Idaea eremica (Brandt, 1941)
- Idaea granulosa (Warren & Rothschild, 1905)
- Idaea illustris (Brandt, 1941)
- Idaea mimetes (Brandt, 1941)
- Idaea sanctaria Staudinger, 1900
- Idaea sordida (Rothschild, 1913)
- Isturgia disputaria (Guenée, 1858)
- Lithostege fissurata Mabille, 1888
- Microloxia ruficornis Warren, 1897
- Neromia pulvereisparsa (Hampson, 1896)
- Orthonama obstipata (Fabricius, 1794)
- Palaeaspilates sublutearia (Wiltshire, 1977)
- Pasiphila palaearctica (Brandt, 1938)
- Phaiogramma discessa (Walker, 1861)
- Pingasa lahayei (Oberthür, 1887)
- Pseudosterrha rufistrigata (Hampson, 1896)
- Rhodometra sacraria (Linnaeus, 1767)
- Scopula adelpharia (Püngeler, 1894)
- Scopula caesaria (Walker, 1861)
- Scopula chalcographata Brandt, 1938
- Scopula minorata (Boisduval, 1833)
- Scopula similata (Le Cerf, 1924)
- Spiralisigna angusta Hausmann & Skou, 2008
- Traminda mundissima (Walker, 1861)
- Xanthorhoe wiltshirei (Brandt, 1941)
- Zygophyxia relictata (Walker, 1866)

== Gracillariidae ==
- Phyllocnistis citrella Stainton, 1856

== Nepticulidae ==
- Acalyptris galinae (Puplesis, 1984)
- Acalyptris gielisi van Nieukerken, 2010
- Acalyptris repeteki (Puplesis, 1984)
- Stigmella birgittae Gustafsson, 1985
- Stigmella xystodes (Meyrick, 1916)

== Noctuidae ==
- Acontia biskrensis Oberthür, 1887
- Acontia trimaculata Aurivillius, 1879
- Agrotis sardzeana Brandt, 1941
- Aucha polyphaenoides (Wiltshire, 1961)
- Caradrina africarabica (Plante, 1997)
- Drasteria kabylaria (Bang-Haas, 1906)
- Eublemma siticuosa (Lederer, 1858)
- Heteropalpia acrosticta (Püngeler, 1904)
- Heteropalpia rosacea (Rebel, 1907)
- Heteropalpia vetusta (Walker, 1865)
- Oraesia intrusa (Krüger, 1939)
- Plecoptera reflexa Guenée, 1852
- Thiacidas postica Walker, 1855
- Ulotrichopus tinctipennis (Hampson, 1902)

== Nolidae ==
- Churia gallagheri Wiltshire, 1985

== Oecophoridae ==
- Stathmopoda auriferella (Walker, 1864)
- Stathmopoda bicolorella Koster, 2010
- Stathmopoda ficivora Kasy, 1973
- Tortilia pallidella Kasy, 1973

== Pterophoridae ==
- Agdistis nanodes Meyrick, 1906
- Agdistis olei Arenberger, 1976
- Agdistis qurayyahiensis Gielis, 2008
- Agdistis tamaricis (Zeller, 1847)
- Agdistis tenera Arenberger, 1976
- Capperia celeusi (Frey, 1886)
- Emmelina monodactyla (Linnaeus, 1758)
- Megalorhipida leucodactylus (Fabricius, 1794)
- Sphenarches anisodactylus (Walker, 1864)
- Stenodacma wahlbergi (Zeller, 1852)
- Stenoptilodes taprobanes (Felder & Rogenhofer, 1875)

== Pyralidae ==
- Acrobasis minutalis Asselbergs, 2008
- Acteniopsis robustus Asselbergs, 2010
- Aglossa aglossalis (Ragonot, 1892)
- Ambluncus nervosellus Amsel, 1953
- Ancylosis costistrigella (Ragonot, 1890)
- Ancylosis lacteicostella (Ragonot, 1887)
- Ancylosis nubeculella (Ragonot, 1887)
- Ancylosis obscuripunctella Roesler, 1973
- Ancylosis ochraceella Asselbergs, 2008
- Arenipses sabella Hampson, 1901
- Arsenaria caidalis (Hampson, 1900)
- Arsenaria hyrcanalis (Amsel, 1951)
- Asalebria adiudicata Asselbergs, 2008
- Bazaria lixiviella (Erschoff, 1874)
- Bazaria pempeliella Ragonot, 1893
- Belutchistania squamalis Amsel, 1951
- Canthelea safadalis Asselbergs, 2008
- Ceutholopha isidis (Zeller, 1867)
- Cherchera abatesella Dumont, 1932
- Dalakia uniformella Amsel, 1961
- Ditrachyptera verruciferella (Ragonot, 1888)
- Epicrocis pseudodiscomaculella (Amsel, 1935)
- Epiepischnia minimella Asselbergs, 2008
- Epischnia albella Amsel, 1953
- Etiella zinckenella (Treitschke, 1832)
- Faveria cineracella (Amsel, 1953)
- Faveria dionysia (Zeller, 1846)
- Faveria tchourouma Amsel, 1961
- Galleria mellonella (Linnaeus, 1758)
- Hypotia birgita Asselbergs, 2008
- Hypotia numidalis Hampson, 1900)
- Isauria dilucidella (Duponchel, 1836)
- Lamoria anella ([Denis & Schiffermüller], 1775)
- Myelois quadripunctella Zerny, 1914
- Neorastia albicostella Amsel, 1953
- Paralaodamia ajbanica Asselbergs, 2008
- Pempelia arida Asselbergs, 2008
- Pempelia tchabaharella Amsel, 1950
- Phycita arabica Asselbergs, 2008
- Pseudosyria malacella (Staudinger, 1870)
- Pyralis pictalis (Curtis, 1834)
- Raphimetopus ablutella (Zeller, 1839)
- Rungsina mimicralis (Amsel, 1951)
- Saluria eremica Asselbergs, 2008
- Scotomera gielisi Asselbergs, 2008
- Scotomera minimalis (Amsel, 1949)
- Staudingeria albifrontella Asselbergs, 2010
- Staudingeria aspilatella (Ragonot, 1887)
- Staudingeria partitella Ragonot, 1887
- Susia uberalis (Swinhoe, 1884)

== Tischeriidae ==
- Tischeria ptarmica Meyrick, 1908

== Tortricidae ==
- Age onychistica Diakonoff, 1982
- Ancylis sederana Chrétien, 1915
- Bactra minima Meyrick, 1909
- Bactra venosana (Zeller, 1847)
- Crocidosema plebejana Zeller, 1847
- Dasodis cladographa Diakonoff, 1983
- Fulcrifera refrigescens (Meyrick, 1924)
- Loboschiza koenigiana (Fabricius, 1775)
- Ophiorrhabda cellifera (Meyrick, 1912)
- Selania resedana (Obraztsov, 1959)

== Xyloryctidae ==
- Eretmocera bradleyi Amsel, 1961
- Eretmocera impactella (Walker, 1864)
- Scythris amplexella Bengtsson, 2002
- Scythris cucullella Bengtsson, 2002
- Scythris elachistoides Bengtsson, 2002
- Scythris kebirella Amsel, 1935
- Scythris nipholecta Meyrick, 1924
- Scythris pangalactis Meyrick, 1933
- Scythris parenthesella Bengtsson, 2002
- Scythris valgella Bengtsson, 2002
- Scythris valvaearcella Bengtsson, 2002
