= List of moths of Sudan and South Sudan =

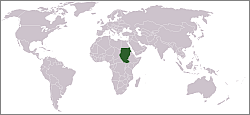
Location of Sudan and South Sudan

There are about 350 known moth species of Sudan and South Sudan. The moths (mostly nocturnal) and butterflies (mostly diurnal) together make up the taxonomic order Lepidoptera.

This is a list of moth species which have been recorded in Sudan and South Sudan.

== Arctiidae ==
- Acantharctia metaleuca Hampson, 1901
- Afrowatsonius fulvomarginalis (Wichgraf, 1921)
- Afrowatsonius sudanicus (Rothschild, 1933)
- Aloa moloneyi (Druce, 1887)
- Alpenus maculosa (Stoll, 1781)
- Alpenus nigropunctata (Bethune-Baker, 1908)
- Alpenus schraderi (Rothschild, 1910)
- Alpenus wichgrafi Watson, 1988
- Amata shoa (Hampson, 1898)
- Amata tomasina (Butler, 1876)
- Amsacta latimarginalis Rothschild, 1933
- Caripodia chrysargyria Hampson, 1900
- Creatonotos leucanioides Holland, 1893
- Creatonotos leucanioides Holland, 1893
- Creatonotos punctivitta (Walker, 1854)
- Metarctia pumila Hampson, 1909
- Oedaleosia concolor Strand, 1912
- Paralacydes arborifera (Butler, 1875)
- Spilosoma curvilinea Walker, 1855
- Spilosoma metaleuca (Hampson, 1905)

== Autostichidae ==
- Turatia scioneura (Meyrick, 1929)

== Coleophoridae ==
- Coleophora aularia Meyrick, 1924
- Coleophora sudanella Rebel, 1916

== Cosmopterigidae ==
- Bifascioides leucomelanella (Rebel, 1917)
- Gisilia sclerodes (Meyrick, 1909)

== Cossidae ==
- Meharia semilactea (Warren & Rothschild, 1905)
- Nomima prophanes Durrant, 1916
- Paropta henleyi (Warren & Rothschild, 1905)
- Phragmatoecioides pectinicornis Strand, 1915

== Crambidae ==
- Cataclysta leroii Strand, 1915
- Charltona albidalis Hampson, 1919
- Cnaphalocrocis trapezalis (Guenée, 1854)
- Cornifrons ulceratalis Lederer, 1858
- Crambus diarhabdellus Hampson, 1919
- Crambus sudanicola Strand, 1915
- Culladia achroellum (Mabille, 1900)
- Cybalomia pentadalis Lederer, 1855
- Cybalomia simplex Warren & Rothschild, 1905
- Diplopseustis perieresalis (Walker, 1859)
- Elethyia albirufalis (Hampson, 1919)
- Euchromius cambridgei (Zeller, 1867)
- Euchromius ocellea (Haworth, 1811)
- Hellula undalis (Fabricius, 1781)
- Herpetogramma phaeopteralis (Guenée, 1854)
- Nomophila noctuella ([Denis & Schiffermüller], 1775)
- Platytes impar Warren & Rothschild, 1905
- Pleuroptya balteata (Fabricius, 1798)
- Prionapteryx alternalis Maes, 2002
- Prionapteryx soudanensis (Hampson, 1919)
- Scirpophaga praelata (Scopoli, 1763)
- Spoladea recurvalis (Fabricius, 1775)

== Elachistidae ==
- Ethmia quadrinotella (Mann, 1861)

== Gelechiidae ==
- Ochrodia subdiminutella (Stainton, 1867)
- Pectinophora gossypiella (Saunders, 1844)
- Scrobipalpa ergasima (Meyrick, 1916)

== Geometridae ==
- Acidaliastis micra Hampson, 1896
- Callioratis apicisecta Prout, 1915
- Celidomphax prolongata Prout, 1915
- Chiasmia ate (Prout, 1926)
- Chiasmia maculosa (Warren, 1899)
- Chiasmia sudanata (Warren & Rothschild, 1905)
- Cleora rostella D. S. Fletcher, 1967
- Hemidromodes robusta (Prout, 1913)
- Heterostegane minutissima (Swinhoe, 1904)
- Idaea granulosa (Warren & Rothschild, 1905)
- Idaea microptera (Warren & Rothschild, 1905)
- Idaea sanctaria Staudinger, 1900
- Isturgia disputaria (Guenée, 1858)
- Lomographa indularia (Guenée, 1858)
- Microloxia ruficornis Warren, 1897
- Omphalucha brunnea (Warren, 1899)
- Polystroma steeleae (Prout, 1934)
- Prasinocyma immaculata (Thunberg, 1784)
- Pseudosterrha paulula (Swinhoe, 1886)
- Pseudosterrha rufistrigata (Hampson, 1896)
- Scopula adelpharia (Püngeler, 1894)
- Scopula natalica (Butler, 1875)
- Scopula pseudophema Prout, 1920
- Syndromodes invenusta (Wallengren, 1863)
- Xanthorhoe exorista Prout, 1922
- Zamarada anacantha D. S. Fletcher, 1974
- Zamarada delta D. S. Fletcher, 1974
- Zamarada melasma D. S. Fletcher, 1974
- Zamarada minimaria Swinhoe, 1895
- Zamarada nasuta Warren, 1897
- Zamarada secutaria (Guenée, 1858)
- Zamarada torrida D. S. Fletcher, 1974

== Gracillariidae ==
- Acrocercops bifasciata (Walsingham, 1891)
- Phyllocnistis citrella Stainton, 1856
- Stomphastis conflua (Meyrick, 1914)

== Lasiocampidae ==
- Anadiasa obsoleta (Klug, 1830)
- Anadiasa simplex Pagenstecher, 1903
- Beralade obliquata (Klug, 1830)
- Braura nilotica (Aurivillius, 1925)
- Chrysopsyche wilsoni Tams, 1938
- Odontocheilopteryx maculata Aurivillius, 1905
- Streblote butiti (Bethune-Baker, 1906)
- Streblote diluta (Aurivillius, 1905)

== Limacodidae ==
- Chrysamma purpuripulcra Karsch, 1896
- Coenobasis postflavida Hampson, 1910
- Gavara caprai Berio, 1937
- Macroplectra iracunda Hering, 1928

== Lymantriidae ==
- Cropera testacea Walker, 1855
- Crorema setinoides (Holland, 1893)
- Crorema sudanica Strand, 1915
- Euproctis erythrosticta (Hampson, 1910)
- Euproctis ostentum Hering, 1926
- Euproctis xanthosoma Hampson, 1910

== Metarbelidae ==
- Moyencharia winteri Lehmann, 2013

== Nepticulidae ==
- Stigmella xystodes (Meyrick, 1916)

== Noctuidae ==
- Abrostola confusa Dufay, 1958
- Acantholipes circumdata (Walker, 1858)
- Achaea catella Guenée, 1852
- Achaea lienardi (Boisduval, 1833)
- Achaea phaeobasis Hampson, 1913
- Acontia basifera Walker, 1857
- Acontia buchanani (Rothschild, 1921)
- Acontia dichroa (Hampson, 1914)
- Acontia discoidoides Hacker, Legrain & Fibiger, 2008
- Acontia hortensis Swinhoe, 1884
- Acontia insocia (Walker, 1857)
- Acontia karachiensis Swinhoe, 1889
- Acontia opalinoides Guenée, 1852
- Acontia semialba Hampson, 1910
- Aegle exsiccata (Warren & Rothschild, 1905)
- Aegocera rectilinea Boisduval, 1836
- Agrotis biconica Kollar, 1844
- Agrotis ipsilon (Hufnagel, 1766)
- Agrotis sardzeana Brandt, 1941
- Agrotis segetum ([Denis & Schiffermüller], 1775)
- Amyna axis Guenée, 1852
- Antarchaea conicephala (Staudinger, 1870)
- Asplenia melanodonta (Hampson, 1896)
- Audea humeralis Hampson, 1902
- Audea paulumnodosa Kühne, 2005
- Autoba teilhardi (de Joannis, 1909)
- Brevipecten niloticus Wiltshire, 1977
- Callophisma flavicornis Hampson, 1913
- Caradrina clavipalpis (Scopoli, 1763)
- Cerocala caelata Karsch, 1896
- Cerynea trichobasis Hampson, 1910
- Chusaris rhynchinodes Strand, 1915
- Clytie infrequens (Swinhoe, 1884)
- Clytie sancta (Staudinger, 1900)
- Clytie tropicalis Rungs, 1975
- Crameria amabilis (Drury, 1773)
- Crypsotidia maculifera (Staudinger, 1898)
- Crypsotidia mesosema Hampson, 1913
- Crypsotidia remanei Wiltshire, 1977
- Ctenoplusia limbirena (Guenée, 1852)
- Cyligramma latona (Cramer, 1775)
- Cyligramma limacina (Guérin-Méneville, 1832)
- Diparopsis watersi (Rothschild, 1901)
- Dysgonia orbata Berio, 1955
- Dysgonia torrida (Guenée, 1852)
- Eublemma gayneri (Rothschild, 1901)
- Eublemma kruegeri (Wiltshire, 1970)
- Eublemma parva (Hübner, [1808])
- Eublemma pulverulenta (Warren & Rothschild, 1905)
- Eublemma ragusana (Freyer, 1844)
- Eublemma robertsi Berio, 1969
- Eublemma scitula (Rambur, 1833)
- Gesonia nigripalpa Wiltshire, 1977
- Gesonia obeditalis Walker, 1859
- Gnamptonyx innexa (Walker, 1858)
- Grammodes geometrica (Fabricius, 1775)
- Grammodes stolida (Fabricius, 1775)
- Heliothis nubigera Herrich-Schäffer, 1851
- Heliothis viriplaca (Hufnagel, 1766)
- Heraclia zenkeri (Karsch, 1895)
- Heteropalpia acrosticta (Püngeler, 1904)
- Heteropalpia exarata (Mabille, 1890)
- Heteropalpia profesta (Christoph, 1887)
- Heteropalpia rosacea (Rebel, 1907)
- Heteropalpia vetusta (Walker, 1865)
- Hiccoda dosaroides Moore, 1882
- Hypena abyssinialis Guenée, 1854
- Hypena laceratalis Walker, 1859
- Hypena lividalis (Hübner, 1790)
- Hypena obacerralis Walker, [1859]
- Hypena obsitalis (Hübner, [1813])
- Hypotacha isthmigera Wiltshire, 1968
- Hypotacha ochribasalis (Hampson, 1896)
- Iambiodes incerta (Rothschild, 1913)
- Iambiodes postpallida Wiltshire, 1977
- Leucania melanostrotoides (Strand, 1915)
- Loxioda coniventris Strand, 1915
- Masalia albiseriata (Druce, 1903)
- Masalia bimaculata (Moore, 1888)
- Masalia cheesmanae Seymour, 1972
- Masalia decorata (Moore, 1881)
- Masalia fissifascia (Hampson, 1903)
- Masalia flaviceps (Hampson, 1903)
- Masalia galatheae (Wallengren, 1856)
- Masalia terracottoides (Rothschild, 1921)
- Matopo selecta (Walker, 1865)
- Metachrostis quinaria (Moore, 1881)
- Metopoceras kneuckeri (Rebel, 1903)
- Mocis mayeri (Boisduval, 1833)
- Mocis proverai Zilli, 2000
- Myana sopora Swinhoe, 1884
- Ophiusa mejanesi (Guenée, 1852)
- Oraesia intrusa (Krüger, 1939)
- Ozarba badia (Swinhoe, 1886)
- Ozarba exoplaga Berio, 1940
- Ozarba phaea (Hampson, 1902)
- Ozarba rufula Hampson, 1910
- Pandesma quenavadi Guenée, 1852
- Pandesma robusta (Walker, 1858)
- Pericyma mendax (Walker, 1858)
- Plecopterodes moderata (Wallengren, 1860)
- Polydesma umbricola Boisduval, 1833
- Polytela cliens (Felder & Rogenhofer, 1874)
- Prionofrontia ochrosia Hampson, 1926
- Pseudozarba bipartita (Herrich-Schäffer, 1950)
- Raparna bipuncta Warren & Rothschild, 1905
- Raparna minima Warren & Rothschild, 1905
- Rhynchina albiscripta Hampson, 1916
- Schausia mkabi Kiriakoff, 1974
- Sesamia cretica Lederer, 1857
- Sesamia epunctifera Hampson, 1902
- Sesamia geyri (Strand, 1915)
- Sesamia nonagrioides (Lefèbvre, 1827)
- Speia vuteria (Stoll, 1790)
- Sphingomorpha chlorea (Cramer, 1777)
- Spodoptera cilium Guenée, 1852
- Spodoptera exempta (Walker, 1857)
- Spodoptera exigua (Hübner, 1808)
- Spodoptera littoralis (Boisduval, 1833)
- Syngrapha circumflexa (Linnaeus, 1767)
- Tathorhynchus exsiccata (Lederer, 1855)
- Tathorhynchus leucobasis Bethune-Baker, 1911
- Timora showaki Pinhey, 1956
- Trichoplusia ni (Hübner, [1803])
- Trigonodes hyppasia (Cramer, 1779)
- Tytroca fasciolata (Warren & Rothschild, 1905)
- Ulotrichopus stertzi (Püngeler, 1907)
- Ulotrichopus tinctipennis (Hampson, 1902)
- Vittaplusia vittata (Wallengren, 1856)

== Nolidae ==
- Arcyophora patricula (Hampson, 1902)
- Earias insulana (Boisduval, 1833)
- Earias nubica (Strand, 1915)
- Neaxestis mesogonia (Hampson, 1905)
- Selepa docilis Butler, 1881

== Notodontidae ==
- Antheua gallans (Karsch, 1895)
- Antheua woerdeni (Snellen, 1872)
- Desmeocraera leucophaea Gaede, 1928
- Epidonta brunnea (Rothschild, 1917)
- Leptolepida henleyi (Warren & Rothschild, 1905)
- Notoxantha aurorina Kiriakoff, 1961
- Zerafia drymonides Strand, 1915

== Plutellidae ==
- Plutella xylostella (Linnaeus, 1758)

== Psychidae ==
- Acanthopsyche ebneri (Rebel, 1917)
- Auchmophila kordofensis Rebel, 1907

== Pterophoridae ==
- Agdistis arabica Amsel, 1958
- Agdistis tamaricis (Zeller, 1847)

== Pyralidae ==
- Actenia wollastoni (Rothschild, 1901)
- Aglossa aglossalis (Ragonot, 1892)
- Ancylosis costistrigella (Ragonot, 1890)
- Ancylosis faustinella (Zeller, 1867)
- Ancylosis lacteicostella (Ragonot, 1887)
- Ancylosis limoniella (Chrétien, 1911)
- Ancylosis nubeculella (Ragonot, 1887)
- Anerastia lotella (Hübner, 1813)
- Arenipses sabella Hampson, 1901
- Cadra calidella (Guenée, 1845)
- Cadra figulilella (Gregson, 1871)
- Corcyra cephalonica (Stainton, 1866)
- Ectomyelois ceratoniae (Zeller, 1839)
- Endotricha consobrinalis Zeller, 1852
- Epicrocis ferrealis (Hampson, 1898)
- Epischnia cinerosalis Walker & Rothschild, 1905
- Epischnia masticella Ragonot, 1893
- Euzophera trigeminata Warren & Rothschild, 1905
- Exodesis vaterfieldi Hampson, 1919
- Gymnancyla canella ([Denis & Schiffermüller], 1775)
- Lorymana noctuiformis Strand, 1915
- Nephopterix metamelana Hampson, 1896
- Polyocha anerastiodes Warren & Rothschild, 1905
- Psorosana testaceipennis Strand, 1915
- Pyralis obsoletalis Mann, 1864
- Raphimetopus ablutella (Zeller, 1839)
- Staudingeria suboblitella (Ragonot, 1888)
- Staudingeria yerburii (Butler, 1884)
- Zophodia straminea Strand, 1915

== Saturniidae ==
- Bunaea alcinoe (Stoll, 1780)
- Bunaeopsis hersilia (Westwood, 1849)
- Epiphora albidus (Druce, 1886)
- Epiphora bauhiniae (Guérin-Méneville, 1832)
- Epiphora getula (Maassen & Weymer, 1885)
- Epiphora magdalena Grünberg, 1909
- Epiphora ploetzi (Weymer, 1880)
- Epiphora vacuna (Westwood, 1849)
- Holocerina angulata (Aurivillius, 1893)
- Holocerina istsariensis Stoneham, 1962

== Sesiidae ==
- Melittia ruficincta (Felder, 1874)

== Sphingidae ==
- Ceridia heuglini (C. & R. Felder, 1874)
- Hippotion celerio (Linnaeus, 1758)
- Hippotion rebeli Rothschild & Jordan, 1903
- Hyles livornica (Esper, 1780)
- Leucophlebia afra Karsch, 1891
- Neopolyptychus consimilis (Rothschild & Jordan, 1903)
- Nephele peneus (Cramer, 1776)
- Polyptychoides grayii (Walker, 1856)
- Polyptychoides niloticus (Jordan, 1921)
- Pseudoclanis abyssinicus (Lucas, 1857)
- Pseudoclanis molitor (Rothschild & Jordan, 1912)

== Thyrididae ==
- Netrocera setioides Felder, 1874

== Tineidae ==
- Ceratophaga tragoptila (Meyrick, 1917)
- Ceratophaga vastella (Zeller, 1852)
- Edosa pyrochra (Gozmány, 1965)
- Hapsifera rhodoptila Meyrick, 1920
- Machaeropteris baloghi Gozmány, 1965
- Perissomastix nigriceps Warren & Rothschild, 1905
- Perissomastix perdita Gozmány, 1965
- Perissomastix taeniaecornis (Walsingham, 1896)
- Philagraulella punica (Meyrick, 1930)
- Sphallestasis cristata (Gozmány, 1967)
- Syncalipsis sudanica Gozmány, 1965
- Tinea murariella Staudinger, 1859
- Trichophaga abruptella (Wollaston, 1858)

== Tortricidae ==
- Bactra bactrana (Kennel, 1901)
- Bactra legitima Meyrick, 1911
- Bactra tornastis Meyrick, 1909
- Bactra venosana (Zeller, 1847)
- Eucosma ioplintha Meyrick, 1930
- Fulcrifera refrigescens (Meyrick, 1924)
- Selania detrita (Meyrick, 1928)

== Xyloryctidae ==
- Scythris amplexella Bengtsson, 2002
- Scythris camelella Walsingham, 1907
- Scythris fissurella Bengtsson, 1997
- Scythris nipholecta Meyrick, 1924
- Scythris pangalactis Meyrick, 1933

== Zygaenidae ==
- Epiorna abessynica (Koch, 1865)
