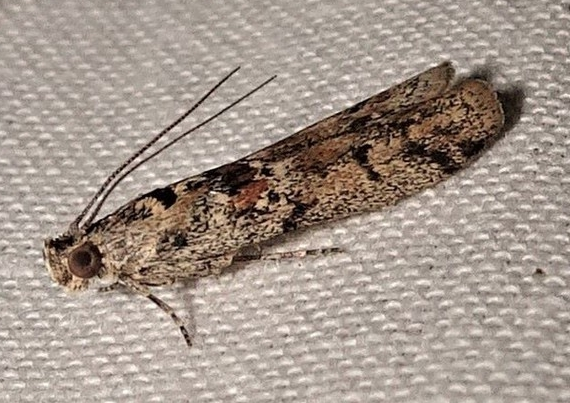
- Ancylosis oblitella

Scientific classification
- Kingdom: Animalia
- Phylum: Arthropoda
- Clade: Pancrustacea
- Class: Insecta
- Order: Lepidoptera
- Family: Pyralidae
- Tribe: Phycitini
- Genus: Ancylosis; Zeller, 1839

Synonyms
- Acornigerula Amsel, 1935; Cabotia Ragonot, 1888; Canarsia Hulst, 1890; Canarsiana Strand, 1920; Cornigerula Amsel, 1935; Encystia Hampson, 1901; Harnocha Dyar, 1914; Hedemannia Ragonot, 1887; Heterographis Ragonot, 1885; Hulstea Hulst, 1903; Hulstia Hampson in Ragonot, 1901; Hypographia Ragonot, 1890; Hypogryphia Ragonot, 1890; Iransharia Amsel, 1959; Mona Hulst, 1888; Staudingeria Ragonot, 1887; Syria Ragonot, 1887

= Ancylosis =

Genus of moths

Ancylosis is a genus of snout moths. It was described by Philipp Christoph Zeller in 1839, and is known from South Africa, Uzbekistan, Spain, Turkmenistan, Lebanon, Algeria, Tunisia, Russia, Israel, Palestine, Greece, Australia, Seychelles, Afghanistan, the United States, Iraq, Namibia, Kazakhstan, Iran, Mauritius, Mozambique, Lebanon, Argentina, Sri Lanka, and Yemen.

== Species ==
- Subgenus Ancylosis
  - Ancylosis anguinosella Zeller, 1848
  - Ancylosis cinnamomella (Duponchel, 1836)
  - Ancylosis dryadella (Ragonot, 1887)
  - Ancylosis imitella Hampson, 1901
  - Ancylosis sareptalla (Herrich-Schäffer, 1861)
  - Ancylosis uncinatella (Ragonot, 1890)
- Subgenus Heterographis Ragonot, 1885
  - Ancylosis albicosta (Staudinger, 1870)
  - Ancylosis convexella (Lederer, 1855)
  - Ancylosis faustinella (Zeller, 1867)
  - Ancylosis gracilella (Ragonot, 1887)
  - Ancylosis harmoniella (Ragonot, 1887)
  - Ancylosis hellenica (Staudinger, 1871)
  - Ancylosis muliebris (Meyrick, 1937)
  - Ancylosis nervosella (Zerny, 1914)
  - Ancylosis nigripunctella (Staudinger, 1879)
  - Ancylosis ochracea (Staudinger, 1870)
  - Ancylosis pallida (Staudinger, 1870)
  - Ancylosis pectinatella (Ragonot, 1887)
  - Ancylosis plumbatella (Ragonot, 1888)
  - Ancylosis pyrethrella (Herrich-Schäffer, 1860)
  - Ancylosis rhodochrella (Herrich-Schäffer, 1855)
  - Ancylosis roscidella (Eversmann, 1844)
  - Ancylosis sabulosella (Staudinger, 1879)
  - Ancylosis samaritanella (Zeller, 1867)
  - Ancylosis syrtella (Ragonot, 1887)
  - Ancylosis xylinella (Staudinger, 1870)
- Subgenus Cabotia Ragonot, 1888
  - Ancylosis lacteicostella (Ragonot, 1887)
  - Ancylosis leucocephala (Staudinger, 1879)
  - Ancylosis oblitella (Zeller, 1848)
- Subgenus Syria Ragonot, 1887
  - Ancylosis arenosella (Staudinger, 1859)
  - Ancylosis citrinella (Ragonot, 1887)
- Subgenus unknown
  - Ancylosis aeola Balinsky, 1987
  - Ancylosis albidella Ragonot, 1888
  - Ancylosis albifrontella (Asselbergs, 2010)
  - Ancylosis aspilatella (Ragonot, 1887)
  - Ancylosis atrisparsella (Hampson, 1901)
  - Ancylosis biflexella (Lederer, 1855)
  - Ancylosis brunneella Chrétien, 1911
  - Ancylosis calcariella (Ragonot & Hampson in Ragonot, 1901)
  - Ancylosis cinnamomeifascia (Rothschild, 1915)
  - Ancylosis costistrigella (Ragonot, 1890)
  - Ancylosis decentella (Ragonot, 1887)
  - Ancylosis deserticola Staudinger, 1870
  - Ancylosis detersella Hampson, 1926
  - Ancylosis discocellularis Strand, 1920
  - Ancylosis dumetella (Ragonot, 1887)
  - Ancylosis eremicola (Amsel, 1935)
  - Ancylosis euclastella (Ragonot, 1887)
  - Ancylosis eugraphella Balinsky, 1987
  - Ancylosis glaphyria Balinsky, 1987
  - Ancylosis griseomixtella (Ragonot, 1887)
  - Ancylosis ianthemis (Meyrick, 1887)
  - Ancylosis insularella (Ragonot, 1893)
  - Ancylosis interjectella (Ragonot, 1888)
  - Ancylosis iranella Ragonot, 1887
  - Ancylosis maculifera Staudinger, 1870
  - Ancylosis magnifica (Butler, 1875)
  - Ancylosis mimeugraphella Balinsky, 1989
  - Ancylosis monella (Roesler, 1973)
  - Ancylosis morbosella Staudinger, 1879
  - Ancylosis morrisonella (Ragonot, 1887)
  - Ancylosis namibiella Balinsky, 1987
  - Ancylosis nubeculella (Ragonot, 1887)
  - Ancylosis obscuripunctella Roesler, 1973 (the replacement name for Ancylosis nigripunctella (Amsel, 1959), a junior secondary homonym of Ancylosis nigripunctella (Staudinger, 1879))
  - Ancylosis ocellella (Ragonot, 1901)
  - Ancylosis ochraceella Asselbergs, 2008
  - Ancylosis ochricostella Ragonot, 1887
  - Ancylosis ormuzdella Amsel, 1954
  - Ancylosis pallidimarginalis (Rothschild, 1915)
  - Ancylosis partitella Ragonot, 1887
  - Ancylosis pectinatella (de Joannis, 1915)
  - Ancylosis platynephes (de Joannis, 1927)
  - Ancylosis rhythmatica (Dyar, 1914)
  - Ancylosis rufifasciella (Hampson, 1901)
  - Ancylosis semidiscella Ragonot, 1888
  - Ancylosis similis Balinsky, 1987
  - Ancylosis singhalella (Ragonot in de Joannis & Ragonot, 1889)
  - Ancylosis subpyrethrella (Ragonot, 1888)
  - Ancylosis sulcatella (Christoph, 1877)
  - Ancylosis thiosticha Turner, 1947
  - Ancylosis trimaculella (D. Lucas, 1943)
  - Ancylosis ulmiarrosorella Clemens, 1860
  - Ancylosis undulatella (Clemens, 1860)
  - Ancylosis velessa (Dyar, 1914)
  - Ancylosis versicolorella (Ragonot, 1887)
  - Ancylosis yerburii (Butler, 1884)
