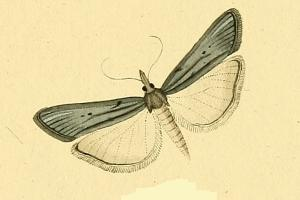
- Epischnia prodromella

Scientific classification
- Kingdom: Animalia
- Phylum: Arthropoda
- Clade: Pancrustacea
- Class: Insecta
- Order: Lepidoptera
- Family: Pyralidae
- Subfamily: Phycitinae
- Tribe: Phycitini
- Genus: Epischnia; Hübner, 1825

Synonyms
- Epischnopsis Amsel, 1954; Epischoria Stephens, 1834

= Epischnia =

Genus of moths

Epischnia is a genus of moths of the family Pyralidae described by Jacob Hübner in 1825.

== Species ==
- Epischnia adultella Zeller, 1848
- Epischnia agnieleae Leraut, 2003
- Epischnia albella Amsel, 1954
- Epischnia aspergella Ragonot, 1887
- Epischnia asteris Staudinger, 1870
- Epischnia beharella (Viette, 1964)
- Epischnia brevipalpella Ragonot, 1893
- Epischnia castillella Ragonot, 1894
- Epischnia christophori Ragonot, 1887
- Epischnia cinerosalis Walker & Rothschild, 1905
- Epischnia cretaciella Mann, 1869
- Epischnia glyphella Ragonot, 1887
- Epischnia hesperidella Rebel, 1917
- Epischnia illotella Zeller, 1839
- Epischnia leucoloma Herrich-Schäffer, 1849
- Epischnia leucomixtella Ragonot, 1887
- Epischnia maracandella Ragonot, 1887
- Epischnia masticella Ragonot, 1887
- Epischnia muscidella Ragonot, 1887
- Epischnia nervosella Ragonot, 1887
- Epischnia oculatella Ragonot, 1887
- Epischnia plumbella Ragonot, 1887
- Epischnia prodromella (Hübner, 1799)
- Epischnia ragonotella Rothschild, 1915
- Epischnia sareptella Leraut, 2002
- Epischnia sulcatella Christoph, 1877
- Epischnia thewysi Leraut, 2002
- Epischnia yangtseella (Caradja, 1939)
