= Epischnia asteris =

Scientific classification
- Kingdom: Animalia
- Phylum: Arthropoda
- Clade: Pancrustacea
- Class: Insecta
- Order: Lepidoptera
- Family: Pyralidae
- Genus: Epischnia
- Species: E. asteris

Binomial name
- Epischnia asteris Staudinger, 1870

Synonyms
- Epischnia bankesiella Richardson, 1888; Epischnia peroni Agenjo, 1948; Epischnia asteris obscura Ragonot, 1893

Species of moth

Epischnia asteris is a species of snout moth in the genus Epischnia. It was described by Staudinger in 1870, and is known from France, Great Britain, Portugal and Spain.

The wingspan is 27–30 mm. Adults are on wing in July.

The larvae feed on Inula crithmoides. They can be found from August to September and again from April to May after overwintering.
