= Ancylosis cinnamomeifascia =

Scientific classification
- Domain: Eukaryota
- Kingdom: Animalia
- Phylum: Arthropoda
- Class: Insecta
- Order: Lepidoptera
- Family: Pyralidae
- Genus: Ancylosis
- Species: A. cinnamomeifascia

Binomial name
- Ancylosis cinnamomeifascia (Rothschild, 1915)

Synonyms
- Heterographis cinnamomeifascia Rothschild, 1915

Species of moth

Ancylosis cinnamomeifascia is a species of snout moth in the genus Ancylosis. It was described by Rothschild in 1915, and is known from Algeria.
