= Ancylosis ianthemis =

Scientific classification
- Kingdom: Animalia
- Phylum: Arthropoda
- Class: Insecta
- Order: Lepidoptera
- Family: Pyralidae
- Genus: Ancylosis
- Species: A. ianthemis

Binomial name
- Ancylosis ianthemis (Meyrick, 1887)

Synonyms
- Tylochares ianthemis Meyrick, 1887; Trissonca epiterpes Turner, 1904

Species of moth

Ancylosis ianthemis is a species of snout moth in the genus Ancylosis. It was described by Edward Meyrick in 1887 and is known from Australia.
