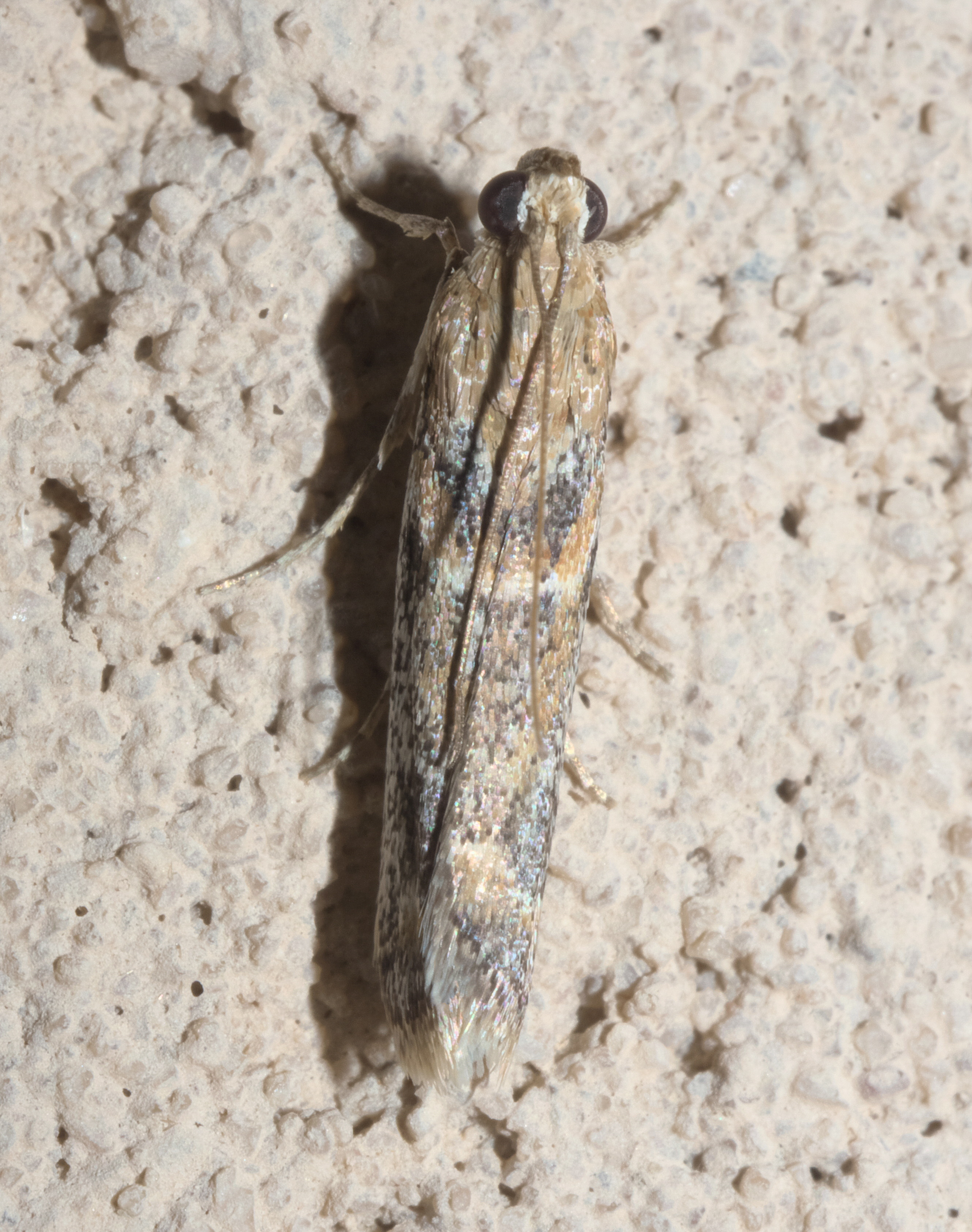

Scientific classification
- Domain: Eukaryota
- Kingdom: Animalia
- Phylum: Arthropoda
- Class: Insecta
- Order: Lepidoptera
- Family: Pyralidae
- Genus: Ancylosis
- Species: A. morrisonella

Binomial name
- Ancylosis morrisonella (Ragonot, 1887)

Synonyms
- Heterographis morrisonella Ragonot, 1887; Heterographis coloradensis Ragonot, 1887; Heterographis colorandensis Heinrich, 1956; Heterographis ignistrigella Ragonot, 1901; Honora palloricostella Walter, 1928; Mona olbiella Hulst, 1888

= Ancylosis morrisonella =

Species of moth

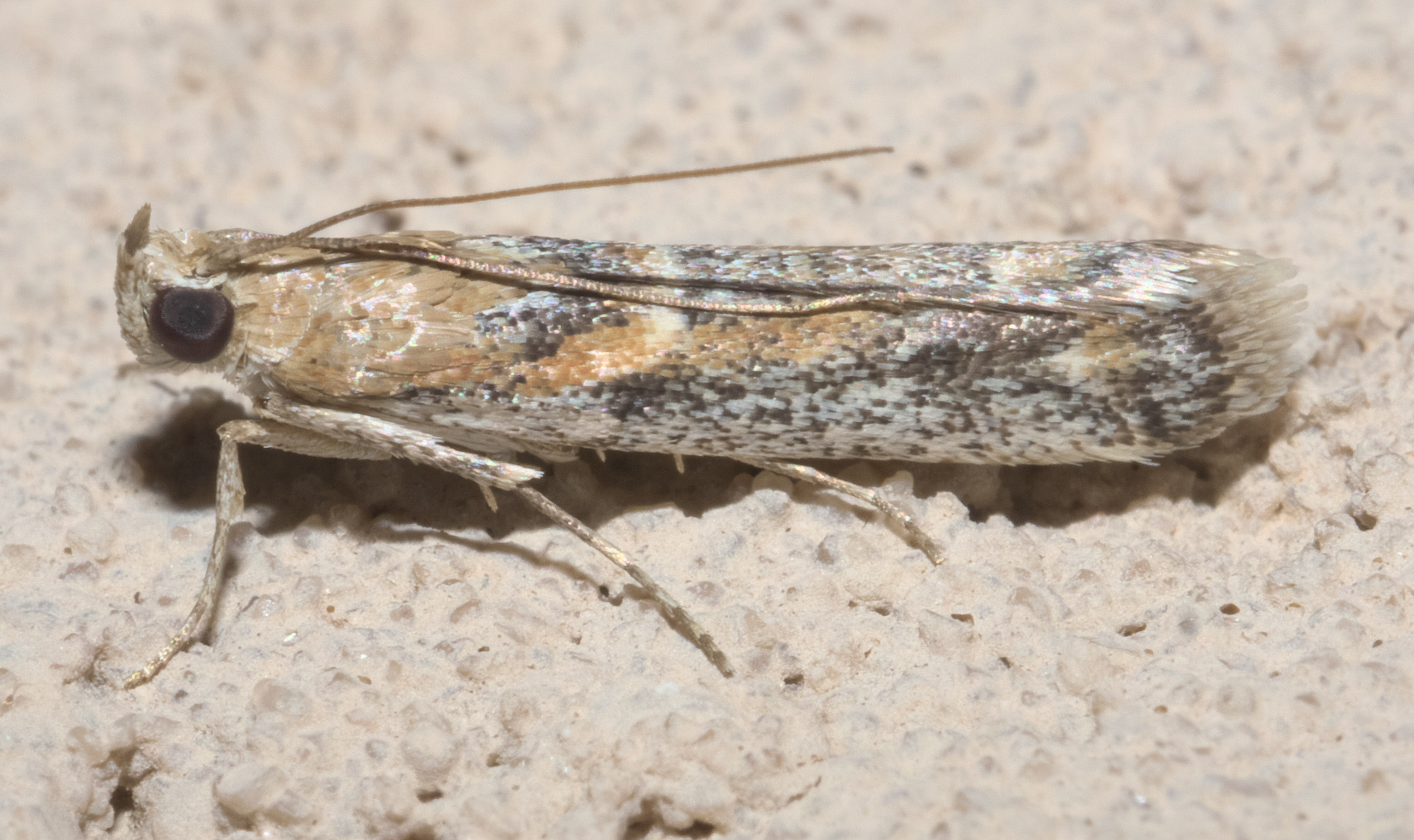
Ancylosis morrisonella, Hodges #5916, Size: 9.2 mm

Ancylosis morrisonella is a species of snout moth in the genus Ancylosis. It was described by Émile Louis Ragonot in 1887, and is known from the United States, including Texas, Arizona and Colorado.
