= Ancylosis euclastella =

Scientific classification
- Domain: Eukaryota
- Kingdom: Animalia
- Phylum: Arthropoda
- Class: Insecta
- Order: Lepidoptera
- Family: Pyralidae
- Genus: Ancylosis
- Species: A. euclastella

Binomial name
- Ancylosis euclastella (Ragonot, 1887)

Synonyms
- Heterographis euclastella Ragonot, 1887

Species of moth

Ancylosis euclastella is a species of snout moth in the genus Ancylosis. It was described by Émile Louis Ragonot in 1887. It is found in China.
