= Epischnia castillella =

Scientific classification
- Kingdom: Animalia
- Phylum: Arthropoda
- Clade: Pancrustacea
- Class: Insecta
- Order: Lepidoptera
- Family: Pyralidae
- Genus: Epischnia
- Species: E. castillella

Binomial name
- Epischnia castillella Ragonot, 1894

Species of moth

Epischnia castillella is a species of snout moth in the genus Epischnia. It was described by Ragonot in 1894, and is known from Spain and Morocco.
