= Ancylosis maculifera =

Scientific classification
- Domain: Eukaryota
- Kingdom: Animalia
- Phylum: Arthropoda
- Class: Insecta
- Order: Lepidoptera
- Family: Pyralidae
- Genus: Ancylosis
- Species: A. maculifera

Binomial name
- Ancylosis maculifera Staudinger, 1870

Species of moth

Ancylosis maculifera is a species of snout moth in the genus Ancylosis. It was described by Staudinger in 1870. It is found in Russia, Ukraine, Romania, Bulgaria, Spain and Kazakhstan.

The wingspan is 18–23 mm.
