= Ancylosis detersella =

Scientific classification
- Kingdom: Animalia
- Phylum: Arthropoda
- Class: Insecta
- Order: Lepidoptera
- Family: Pyralidae
- Genus: Ancylosis
- Species: A. detersella

Binomial name
- Ancylosis detersella Hampson, 1926

Species of moth

Ancylosis detersella is a species of snout moth in the genus Ancylosis. It was described by George Hampson in 1926. It is found in South Africa.
