= Ancylosis pallida =

Scientific classification
- Domain: Eukaryota
- Kingdom: Animalia
- Phylum: Arthropoda
- Class: Insecta
- Order: Lepidoptera
- Family: Pyralidae
- Genus: Ancylosis
- Species: A. pallida

Binomial name
- Ancylosis pallida (Staudinger, 1870)

Synonyms
- Myelois pallida Staudinger, 1870

Species of moth

Ancylosis pallida is a species of snout moth in the genus Ancylosis. It was described by Staudinger, in 1870, and is known from Russia, Romania and Greece.

The wingspan is 23–24 mm.
