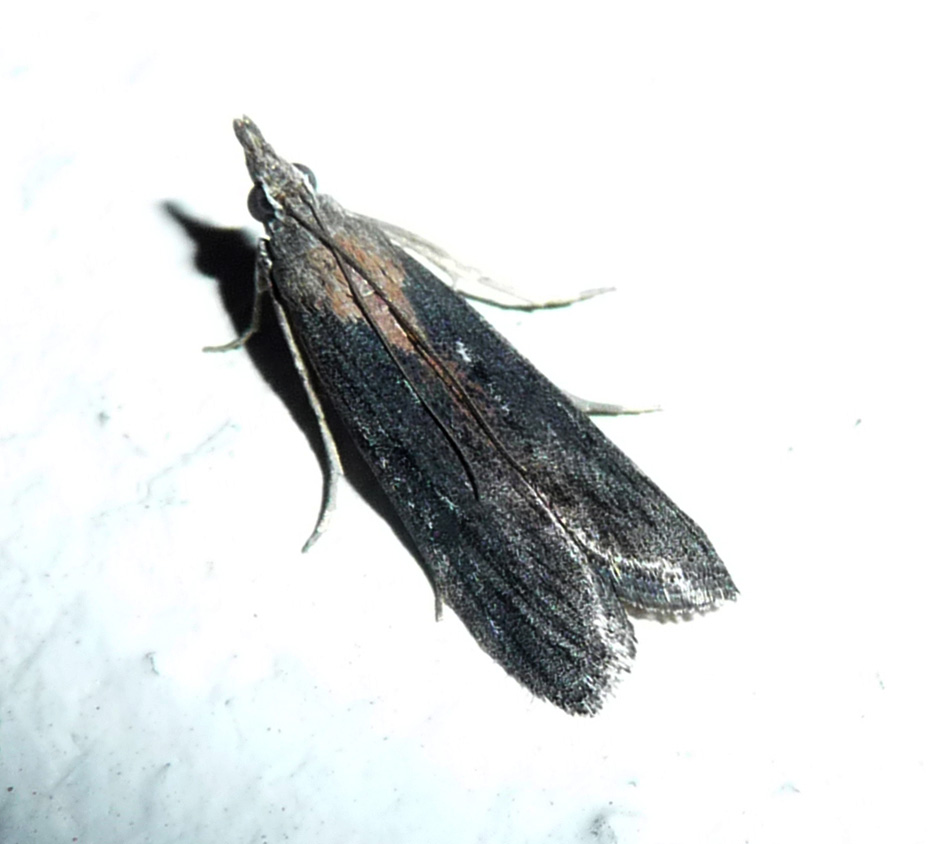
- Epischnia illotella is a species of snout moth belonging to the family Pyralidae, first described by Zeller in 1839. It is typically found across various parts of Europe, particularly in warm and dry habitats such as grasslands and open areas where its host plants grow. Like other members of its family, it has slender wings with brownish to grayish tones that help it blend into its surroundings. The larvae are known to feed primarily on species of Gypsophila (baby’s breath), making these plants important to its life cycle. Overall, Epischnia illotella is a small, unobtrusive moth that plays a role in its ecosystem through its interactions with native flora.

Scientific classification
- Kingdom: Animalia
- Phylum: Arthropoda
- Clade: Pancrustacea
- Class: Insecta
- Order: Lepidoptera
- Family: Pyralidae
- Genus: Epischnia
- Species: E. illotella

Binomial name
- Epischnia illotella Zeller, 1839

Synonyms
- Epischnia alfacarella Amsel, 1954; Myelois asteriscella Milliere, 1873

= Epischnia illotella =

Species of moth

Epischnia illotella is a species of snout moth in the genus Epischnia. It was described by Philipp Christoph Zeller in 1839 and is known from Italy, Spain, Portugal, France, Germany, Croatia, Albania, North Macedonia, Greece, Romania, Ukraine, Russia and North Africa.
