= Ancylosis singhalella =

Scientific classification
- Domain: Eukaryota
- Kingdom: Animalia
- Phylum: Arthropoda
- Class: Insecta
- Order: Lepidoptera
- Family: Pyralidae
- Genus: Ancylosis
- Species: A. singhalella

Binomial name
- Ancylosis singhalella (Ragonot in de Joannis & Ragonot, 1889)

Synonyms
- Heterographis singhalella Ragonot in de Joannis & Ragonot, 1889

Species of moth

Ancylosis singhalella is a species of snout moth in the genus Ancylosis. It was described by Émile Louis Ragonot in 1889 and is known from Kandy, Sri Lanka.
