= Epischnia thewysi =

Scientific classification
- Kingdom: Animalia
- Phylum: Arthropoda
- Clade: Pancrustacea
- Class: Insecta
- Order: Lepidoptera
- Family: Pyralidae
- Genus: Epischnia
- Species: E. thewysi

Binomial name
- Epischnia thewysi Leraut, 2002

Species of moth

Epischnia thewysi is a species of snout moth in the genus Epischnia. It was described by Patrice J.A. Leraut in 2002 and is known from Morocco.
