= Ancylosis thiosticha =

Scientific classification
- Domain: Eukaryota
- Kingdom: Animalia
- Phylum: Arthropoda
- Class: Insecta
- Order: Lepidoptera
- Family: Pyralidae
- Genus: Ancylosis
- Species: A. thiosticha

Binomial name
- Ancylosis thiosticha Turner, 1947

Species of moth

Ancylosis thiosticha is a species of snout moth in the genus Ancylosis. It was described by Turner in 1947, and is known from Australia.
