= Ancylosis brunneella =

Scientific classification
- Domain: Eukaryota
- Kingdom: Animalia
- Phylum: Arthropoda
- Class: Insecta
- Order: Lepidoptera
- Family: Pyralidae
- Genus: Ancylosis
- Species: A. brunneella

Binomial name
- Ancylosis brunneella (Chrétien, 1911)

Synonyms
- Staudingeria brunneella Chrétien, 1911

Species of moth

Ancylosis brunneella is a species of snout moth in the genus Ancylosis. It was described by Pierre Chrétien in 1911 and is known from Spain, Algeria Morocco, Tunisia, Libya, Egypt, Sudan, Saudi Arabia and the Palestinian territories.

The wingspan is about 24 mm.
