= Ancylosis semidiscella =

Scientific classification
- Domain: Eukaryota
- Kingdom: Animalia
- Phylum: Arthropoda
- Class: Insecta
- Order: Lepidoptera
- Family: Pyralidae
- Genus: Ancylosis
- Species: A. semidiscella

Binomial name
- Ancylosis semidiscella (Ragonot, 1888)

Synonyms
- Cabotia semidiscella Ragonot, 1888

Species of moth

Ancylosis semidiscella is a species of snout moth in the genus Ancylosis. It was described by Ragonot, in 1888. It is found in Argentina.
