= Ancylosis albidella =

Scientific classification
- Domain: Eukaryota
- Kingdom: Animalia
- Phylum: Arthropoda
- Class: Insecta
- Order: Lepidoptera
- Family: Pyralidae
- Genus: Ancylosis
- Species: A. albidella

Binomial name
- Ancylosis albidella Ragonot, 1888

Species of snout moth

Ancylosis albidella is a species of snout moth in the genus Ancylosis. It was described by Émile Louis Ragonot, in 1888 and is known from Uzbekistan, Spain, Portugal, Hungary and Slovakia.
