= Ancylosis sabulosella =

Scientific classification
- Kingdom: Animalia
- Phylum: Arthropoda
- Clade: Pancrustacea
- Class: Insecta
- Order: Lepidoptera
- Family: Pyralidae
- Genus: Ancylosis
- Species: A. sabulosella

Binomial name
- Ancylosis sabulosella (Staudinger, 1879)

Synonyms
- Myelois sabulosella Staudinger, 1879

Species of moth

Ancylosis sabulosella is a species of snout moth in the genus Ancylosis. It was described by Staudinger, in 1879. It is found in Russia.

The wingspan is about 17 mm.
