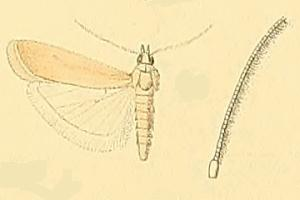

Scientific classification
- Kingdom: Animalia
- Phylum: Arthropoda
- Class: Insecta
- Order: Lepidoptera
- Family: Pyralidae
- Genus: Ancylosis
- Species: A. calcariella

Binomial name
- Ancylosis calcariella (Ragonot & Hampson in Ragonot, 1901)

Synonyms
- Staudingeria calcariella Ragonot & Hampson in Ragonot, 1901; Staudingeria illineella Chrétien, 1911

= Ancylosis calcariella =

Species of moth

Ancylosis calcariella is a species of snout moth in the genus Ancylosis. It was described by Ragonot and Hampson, in 1901, and is known from Tunisia and Spain.

The wingspan is about 28 mm.
