= Ancylosis interjectella =

Scientific classification
- Kingdom: Animalia
- Phylum: Arthropoda
- Class: Insecta
- Order: Lepidoptera
- Family: Pyralidae
- Genus: Ancylosis
- Species: A. interjectella

Binomial name
- Ancylosis interjectella (Ragonot, 1888)

Synonyms
- Heterographis interjectella; Ragonot, 1888

Species of moth

Ancylosis interjectella is a species of snout moth in the genus Ancylosis. It was described by Émile Louis Ragonot in 1888, and is known from South Africa and Namibia.
