= Ancylosis magnifica =

Scientific classification
- Domain: Eukaryota
- Kingdom: Animalia
- Phylum: Arthropoda
- Class: Insecta
- Order: Lepidoptera
- Family: Pyralidae
- Genus: Ancylosis
- Species: A. magnifica

Binomial name
- Ancylosis magnifica (Butler, 1875)

Synonyms
- Aglossa magnifica Butler, 1875; Staudingeria magnifica

Species of moth

Ancylosis magnifica is a species of snout moth in the genus Ancylosis. It was described by Arthur Gardiner Butler in 1875. It is found in South Africa.
