= Epischnia brevipalpella =

Scientific classification
- Kingdom: Animalia
- Phylum: Arthropoda
- Clade: Pancrustacea
- Class: Insecta
- Order: Lepidoptera
- Family: Pyralidae
- Genus: Epischnia
- Species: E. brevipalpella

Binomial name
- Epischnia brevipalpella Ragonot, 1893

Species of moth

Epischnia brevipalpella is a species of snout moth in the genus Epischnia. It was described by Ragonot in 1893. It is found in Madagascar.
