= Ancylosis anguinosella =

Scientific classification
- Kingdom: Animalia
- Phylum: Arthropoda
- Clade: Pancrustacea
- Class: Insecta
- Order: Lepidoptera
- Family: Pyralidae
- Genus: Ancylosis
- Species: A. anguinosella

Binomial name
- Ancylosis anguinosella Zeller, 1848

Species of moth

Ancylosis anguinosella is a species of snout moth in the genus Ancylosis. It was described by Zeller, in 1848. It is found in Russia and Kazakhstan.
