= Epischnia agnieleae =

Scientific classification
- Kingdom: Animalia
- Phylum: Arthropoda
- Clade: Pancrustacea
- Class: Insecta
- Order: Lepidoptera
- Family: Pyralidae
- Genus: Epischnia
- Species: E. agnieleae

Binomial name
- Epischnia agnieleae Leraut, 2003

Species of moth

Epischnia agnieleae is a species of snout moth in the genus Epischnia. It was described by Patrice J.A. Leraut in 2003 and is known from France. |species = agnieleae
