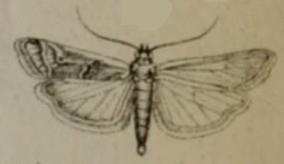

Scientific classification
- Domain: Eukaryota
- Kingdom: Animalia
- Phylum: Arthropoda
- Class: Insecta
- Order: Lepidoptera
- Family: Pyralidae
- Genus: Ancylosis
- Species: A. convexella

Binomial name
- Ancylosis convexella (Lederer, 1855)

Synonyms
- Myelois convexella Lederer, 1855; Euzophera favorinella Zeller, 1867; Nyctegretis albiciliella Staudinger, 1859

= Ancylosis convexella =

Species of moth

Ancylosis convexella is a species of snout moth in the genus Ancylosis. It was described by Julius Lederer in 1855. It is found in Algeria, Jordan, Syria, Portugal, Spain, Greece and on Cyprus.
