= Ancylosis ochracea =

Scientific classification
- Domain: Eukaryota
- Kingdom: Animalia
- Phylum: Arthropoda
- Class: Insecta
- Order: Lepidoptera
- Family: Pyralidae
- Genus: Ancylosis
- Species: A. ochracea

Binomial name
- Ancylosis ochracea (Staudinger, 1870)

Synonyms
- Myelois ochracea Staudinger, 1870

Species of moth

Ancylosis ochracea is a species of snout moth, family Pyralidae. It was described by Otto Staudinger in 1870. It is found in Spain.
