= Ancylosis dumetella =

Scientific classification
- Domain: Eukaryota
- Kingdom: Animalia
- Phylum: Arthropoda
- Class: Insecta
- Order: Lepidoptera
- Family: Pyralidae
- Genus: Ancylosis
- Species: A. dumetella

Binomial name
- Ancylosis dumetella (Ragonot, 1887)

Synonyms
- Heterographis dumetella Ragonot, 1887; Staudingeria albinotella Ragonot, 1887

Species of moth

Ancylosis dumetella is a species of snout moth in the genus Ancylosis. It was described by Émile Louis Ragonot in 1887, and is known from Algeria, Iran, Turkey, as well as Siberia.
