= Epischnia yangtseella =

Scientific classification
- Kingdom: Animalia
- Phylum: Arthropoda
- Clade: Pancrustacea
- Class: Insecta
- Order: Lepidoptera
- Family: Pyralidae
- Genus: Epischnia
- Species: E. yangtseella

Binomial name
- Epischnia yangtseella (Caradja, 1939)

Synonyms
- Etiella yangtseella Caradja, 1939

Species of moth

Epischnia yangtseella is a species of snout moth in the genus Epischnia. It was described by Aristide Caradja in 1939. It is found in China.
