= Ancylosis roscidella =

Scientific classification
- Domain: Eukaryota
- Kingdom: Animalia
- Phylum: Arthropoda
- Class: Insecta
- Order: Lepidoptera
- Family: Pyralidae
- Genus: Ancylosis
- Species: A. roscidella

Binomial name
- Ancylosis roscidella (Eversmann, 1874)

Synonyms
- Phycis roscidella Eversmann, 1874; Ancylosis bartelella Caradja, 1910; Myelois cinerella Stainton, 1859; Acrobasis ephedrella Herrich-Schäffer, 1861; Homoeosoma ephedrella; Ancylosis neglectella Heinemann, 1864; Heterographis benderella Amsel, 1961; Heterographis blandella Ragonot, 1887; Heterographis ochreatella D. Lucas, 1955; Myelois carnea Warren, 1888; Myelois zohrella Oberthür, 1888; Staudingeria brunneella f. oliviella Turati, 1924; Staudingeria brunneella f. purpurella Turati, 1924; Staudingeria cretacella Turati, 1924

Species of moth

Ancylosis roscidella is a species of snout moth in the genus Ancylosis. It was described by Eduard Friedrich Eversmann in 1874 and is known from Russia, Azerbaijan, Iran, Morocco, Algeria, Libya, Spain, France, most of the Balkan Peninsula, and Kazakhstan.
