= Ancylosis albicosta =

Scientific classification
- Domain: Eukaryota
- Kingdom: Animalia
- Phylum: Arthropoda
- Class: Insecta
- Order: Lepidoptera
- Family: Pyralidae
- Genus: Ancylosis
- Species: A. albicosta

Binomial name
- Ancylosis albicosta (Staudinger, 1870)

Synonyms
- Myelois albicosta Staudinger, 1870

Species of moth

Ancylosis albicosta is a species of snout moth in the genus Ancylosis. It was described by Otto Staudinger, in 1870. It is found in Romania, Russia, Turkey, Lebanon and Algeria.

The wingspan is about 24 mm.
