= Epischnia leucoloma =

Scientific classification
- Kingdom: Animalia
- Phylum: Arthropoda
- Clade: Pancrustacea
- Class: Insecta
- Order: Lepidoptera
- Family: Pyralidae
- Genus: Epischnia
- Species: E. leucoloma

Binomial name
- Epischnia leucoloma Herrich-Schäffer, 1849

Synonyms
- Epischnopsis leucoloma

Species of moth

Epischnia leucoloma is a species of snout moth in the genus Epischnia. It was described by Gottlieb August Wilhelm Herrich-Schäffer in 1849, and it is known from Spain, Italy, Croatia and Greece.
