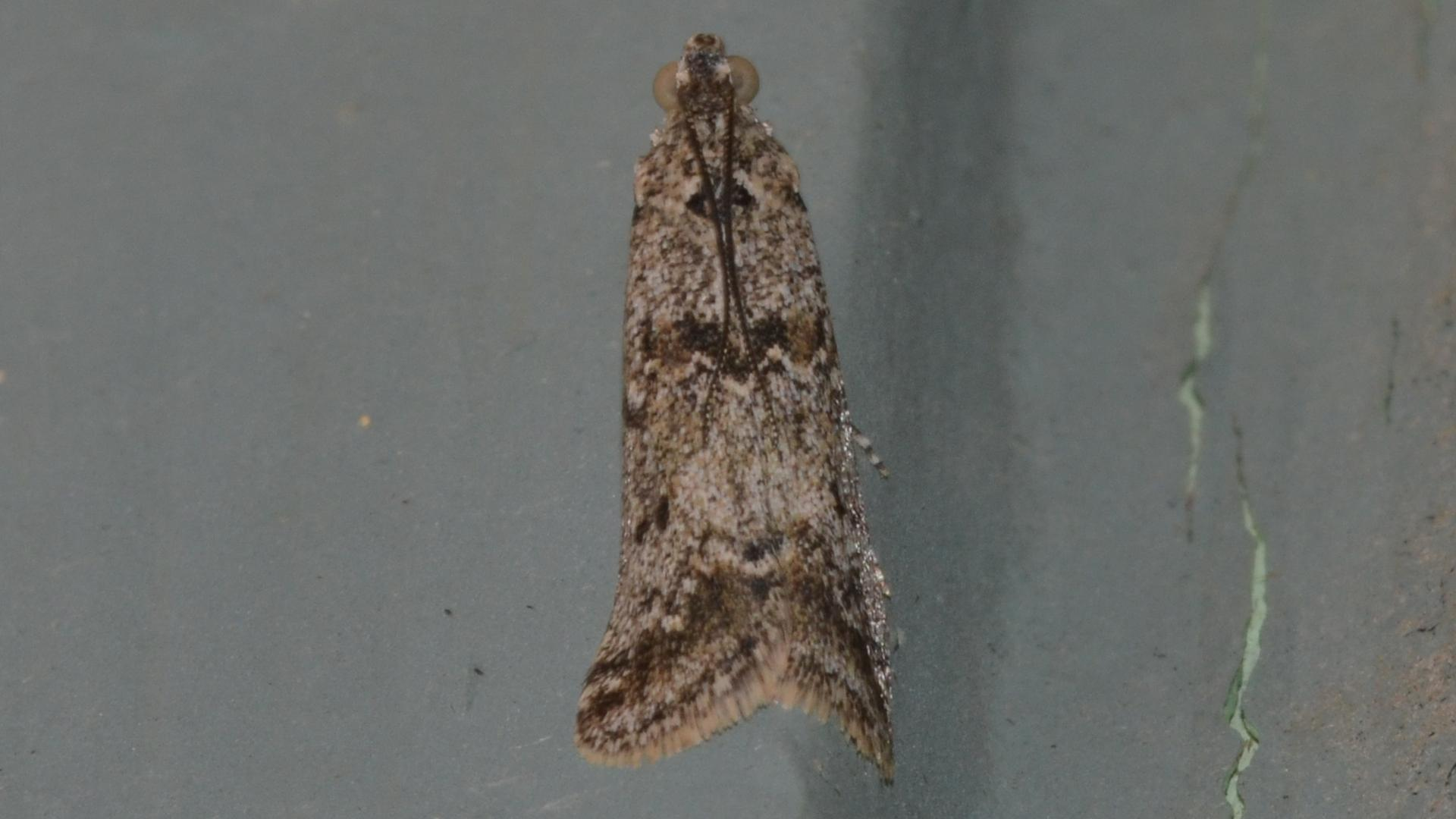

Scientific classification
- Kingdom: Animalia
- Phylum: Arthropoda
- Clade: Pancrustacea
- Class: Insecta
- Order: Lepidoptera
- Family: Pyralidae
- Genus: Ancylosis
- Species: A. undulatella

Binomial name
- Ancylosis undulatella (Clemens, 1860)

Synonyms
- Nephopterix undulatella Clemens, 1860; Hulstia undulatella; Scoparia rubiginalis Walker, 1866

= Ancylosis undulatella =

Species of moth

Ancylosis undulatella, the sugarbeet crown borer moth or sugarbeet crown borer, is a species of snout moth in the genus Ancylosis. It was described by James Brackenridge Clemens in 1860. It is found in North America.
