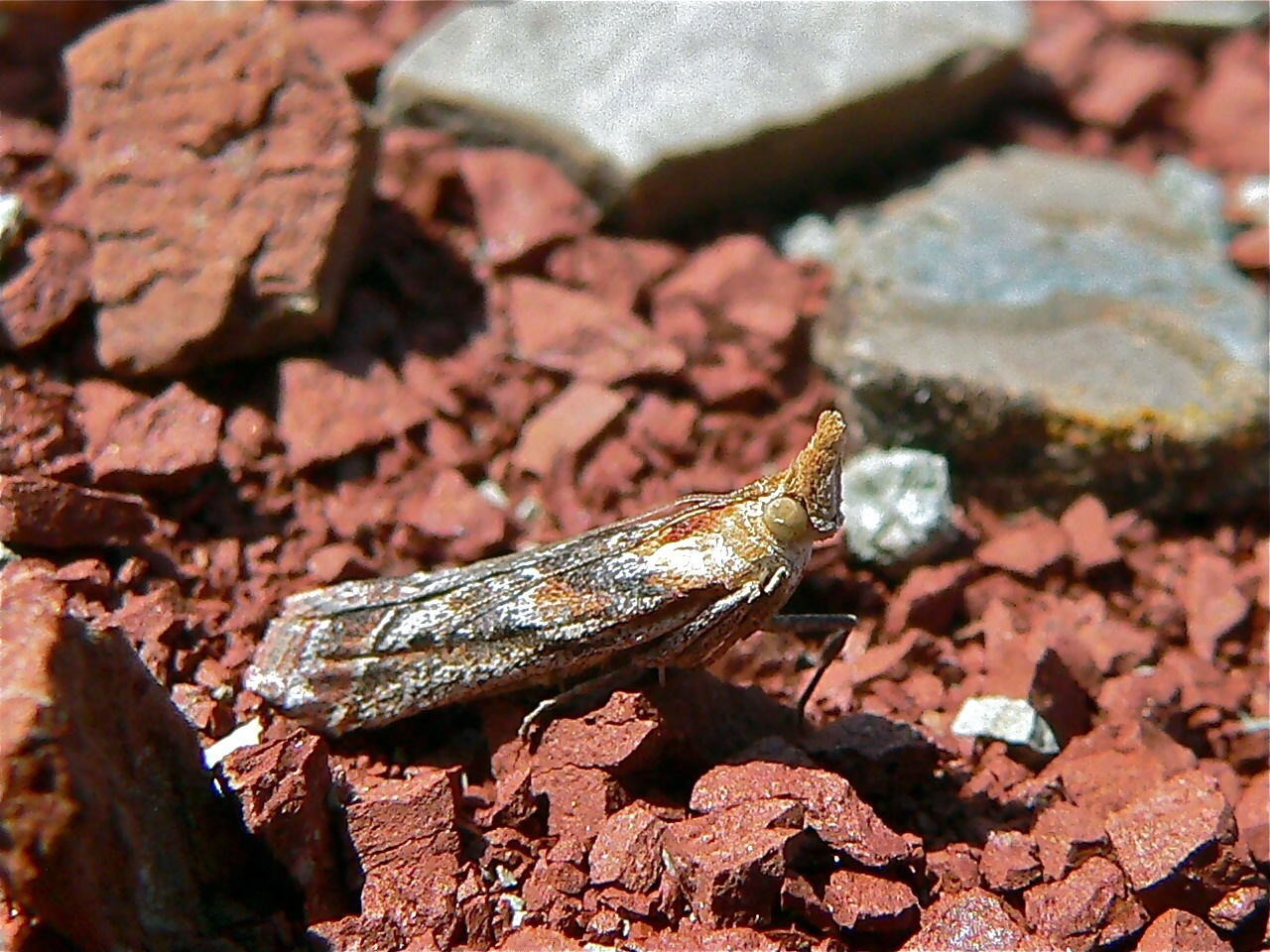

Scientific classification
- Domain: Eukaryota
- Kingdom: Animalia
- Phylum: Arthropoda
- Class: Insecta
- Order: Lepidoptera
- Family: Pyralidae
- Genus: Ancylosis
- Species: A. cinnamomella

Binomial name
- Ancylosis cinnamomella (Duponchel, 1836)

Synonyms
- Phycis cinnamomella Duponchel, 1836; Heterographis bichordella Ragonot, 1887; Heterographis lividella Ragonot, 1887; Ancylosis flammella Ragonot, 1887; Ancylosis byzacaenicella Ragonot, 1887

= Ancylosis cinnamomella =

Species of moth

Ancylosis cinnamomella is a species of snout moth in the genus Ancylosis. It was described by Philogène Auguste Joseph Duponchel, in 1836. It is found in most of Europe.

The wingspan is about 26 mm. There are two generations per year with adults on wing from April to June and again from July to September.

The larvae feed on Sedum acre, Artemisia campestris and Globularia species. They feed from a spinning.
