= Ancylosis nervosella =

Scientific classification
- Domain: Eukaryota
- Kingdom: Animalia
- Phylum: Arthropoda
- Class: Insecta
- Order: Lepidoptera
- Family: Pyralidae
- Genus: Ancylosis
- Species: A. nervosella

Binomial name
- Ancylosis nervosella Zerny, 1914

Synonyms
- Heterographis nervosella

Species of moth

Ancylosis nervosella is a species of snout moth in the genus Ancylosis. It was described by Zerny, in 1914, and is known from Kazakhstan and Russia.
