= Epischnia nervosella =

Scientific classification
- Kingdom: Animalia
- Phylum: Arthropoda
- Clade: Pancrustacea
- Class: Insecta
- Order: Lepidoptera
- Family: Pyralidae
- Genus: Epischnia
- Species: E. nervosella

Binomial name
- Epischnia nervosella Ragonot, 1887

Synonyms
- Epischnopsis nervosella binaloudella Amsel, 1954

Species of moth

Epischnia nervosella is a species of snout moth in the genus Epischnia. It was described by Ragonot in 1887, and is known from Iran and Turkmenistan.
