= Ancylosis versicolorella =

Scientific classification
- Domain: Eukaryota
- Kingdom: Animalia
- Phylum: Arthropoda
- Class: Insecta
- Order: Lepidoptera
- Family: Pyralidae
- Genus: Ancylosis
- Species: A. versicolorella

Binomial name
- Ancylosis versicolorella (Ragonot, 1887)

Synonyms
- Staudingeria versicolorella Ragonot, 1887

Species of moth

Ancylosis versicolorella is a species of snout moth in the genus Ancylosis. It was described by Ragonot in 1887, and is known from Turkmenistan and Spain.

The wingspan is about 23 mm.
