= Ancylosis xylinella =

Scientific classification
- Domain: Eukaryota
- Kingdom: Animalia
- Phylum: Arthropoda
- Class: Insecta
- Order: Lepidoptera
- Family: Pyralidae
- Genus: Ancylosis
- Species: A. xylinella

Binomial name
- Ancylosis xylinella (Staudinger, 1870)

Synonyms
- Myelois xylinella Staudinger, 1870

Species of moth

Ancylosis xylinella is a species of snout moth in the genus Ancylosis. It was described by Staudinger, in 1870. It is found in Spain, Russia, Kazakhstan and Turkey.
