= Ancylosis insularella =

Scientific classification
- Domain: Eukaryota
- Kingdom: Animalia
- Phylum: Arthropoda
- Class: Insecta
- Order: Lepidoptera
- Family: Pyralidae
- Genus: Ancylosis
- Species: A. insularella

Binomial name
- Ancylosis insularella Ragonot, 1893

Synonyms
- Heterographis insularella Ragonot, 1893

Species of moth

Ancylosis insularella is a species of snout moth in the genus Ancylosis. It was described by Émile Louis Ragonot in 1893, and is known from the Seychelles.
