= Ancylosis ormuzdella =

Scientific classification
- Domain: Eukaryota
- Kingdom: Animalia
- Phylum: Arthropoda
- Class: Insecta
- Order: Lepidoptera
- Family: Pyralidae
- Genus: Ancylosis
- Species: A. ormuzdella

Binomial name
- Ancylosis ormuzdella Amsel, 1954

Species of moth

Ancylosis ormuzdella is a species of snout moth in the genus Ancylosis. It was described by Hans Georg Amsel in 1954, and is known from Shiraz, Iran.
