= Ancylosis uncinatella =

Scientific classification
- Domain: Eukaryota
- Kingdom: Animalia
- Phylum: Arthropoda
- Class: Insecta
- Order: Lepidoptera
- Family: Pyralidae
- Genus: Ancylosis
- Species: A. uncinatella

Binomial name
- Ancylosis uncinatella (Ragonot, 1890)

Synonyms
- Hypographia uncinatella Ragonot, 1890

Species of moth

Ancylosis uncinatella is a species of snout moth in the genus Ancylosis. It was described by Ragonot in 1890. It is found in Spain.

The wingspan is about 20 mm.
