= Ancylosis rhodochrella =

Scientific classification
- Domain: Eukaryota
- Kingdom: Animalia
- Phylum: Arthropoda
- Class: Insecta
- Order: Lepidoptera
- Family: Pyralidae
- Genus: Ancylosis
- Species: A. rhodochrella

Binomial name
- Ancylosis rhodochrella (Herrich-Schäffer, 1852)

Synonyms
- Myelois rhodochrella Herrich-Schäffer, 1852; Anerastia delicatella Möschler, 1860

Species of moth

Ancylosis rhodochrella is a species of snout moth in the genus Ancylosis. It was described by Gottlieb August Wilhelm Herrich-Schäffer in 1852, and is known from Russia, Spain, Portugal and Cyprus.
