= Ancylosis rhythmatica =

Scientific classification
- Kingdom: Animalia
- Phylum: Arthropoda
- Clade: Pancrustacea
- Class: Insecta
- Order: Lepidoptera
- Family: Pyralidae
- Genus: Ancylosis
- Species: A. rhythmatica

Binomial name
- Ancylosis rhythmatica (Dyar, 1914)

Synonyms
- Cabotia rhythmatica Dyar, 1914

Species of moth

Ancylosis rhythmatica is a species of snout moth in the genus Ancylosis. It was described by Harrison Gray Dyar Jr. in 1914, and is known from Panama.
