= Ancylosis sareptalla =

Scientific classification
- Domain: Eukaryota
- Kingdom: Animalia
- Phylum: Arthropoda
- Class: Insecta
- Order: Lepidoptera
- Family: Pyralidae
- Genus: Ancylosis
- Species: A. sareptalla

Binomial name
- Ancylosis sareptalla (Herrich-Schaffer, 1861)

Synonyms
- Epischnia sareptalla Herrich-Schaffer, 1861

Species of moth

Ancylosis sareptalla is a species of snout moth in the genus Ancylosis. It was described by Gottlieb August Wilhelm Herrich-Schäffer in 1861. It and is found in both Russia and southern Europe.
