= Ancylosis subpyrethrella =

Scientific classification
- Kingdom: Animalia
- Phylum: Arthropoda
- Class: Insecta
- Order: Lepidoptera
- Family: Pyralidae
- Genus: Ancylosis
- Species: A. subpyrethrella

Binomial name
- Ancylosis subpyrethrella (Ragonot, 1888)

Synonyms
- Heterographis subpyrethrella Ragonot, 1888

Species of moth

Ancylosis subpyrethrella is a species of snout moth in the genus Ancylosis. It was described by Ragonot in 1888, and is known from Namibia and South Africa.
