= Epischnia ragonotella =

Scientific classification
- Kingdom: Animalia
- Phylum: Arthropoda
- Clade: Pancrustacea
- Class: Insecta
- Order: Lepidoptera
- Family: Pyralidae
- Genus: Epischnia
- Species: E. ragonotella

Binomial name
- Epischnia ragonotella Rothschild, 1915

Species of moth

Epischnia ragonotella is a species of snout moth in the genus Epischnia. It was described by Walter Rothschild in 1915. It is found in North Africa, including Algeria.
