= Ancylosis platynephes =

Scientific classification
- Kingdom: Animalia
- Phylum: Arthropoda
- Class: Insecta
- Order: Lepidoptera
- Family: Pyralidae
- Genus: Ancylosis
- Species: A. platynephes

Binomial name
- Ancylosis platynephes (de Joannis, 1927)

Synonyms
- Heterographis platynephes de Joannis, 1927

Species of moth

Ancylosis platynephes is a species of snout moth in the genus Ancylosis. It was described by Joseph de Joannis in 1927 and is known from Mozambique.
