= Ancylosis morbosella =

Scientific classification
- Domain: Eukaryota
- Kingdom: Animalia
- Phylum: Arthropoda
- Class: Insecta
- Order: Lepidoptera
- Family: Pyralidae
- Genus: Ancylosis
- Species: A. morbosella

Binomial name
- Ancylosis morbosella Staudinger, 1879

Species of moth

Ancylosis morbosella is a species of snout moth in the genus Ancylosis. It was described by Staudinger in 1879. It is found in France and Russia.

The wingspan is 21–26 mm.
