= Ancylosis arenosella =

Scientific classification
- Domain: Eukaryota
- Kingdom: Animalia
- Phylum: Arthropoda
- Class: Insecta
- Order: Lepidoptera
- Family: Pyralidae
- Genus: Ancylosis
- Species: A. arenosella

Binomial name
- Ancylosis arenosella (Staudinger, 1859)

Synonyms
- Anerastia arenosella Staudinger, 1859

Species of moth

Ancylosis arenosella is a species of snout moth (family Pyralidae). It is known from southern Europe (Spain, Portugal, and Corsica), the Canary Islands, North Africa, and the Middle East.

The wingspan is about 21 mm.
