= Ancylosis velessa =

Scientific classification
- Kingdom: Animalia
- Phylum: Arthropoda
- Class: Insecta
- Order: Lepidoptera
- Family: Pyralidae
- Genus: Ancylosis
- Species: A. velessa

Binomial name
- Ancylosis velessa (Dyar, 1914)

Synonyms
- Harnocha velessa Dyar, 1914

Species of moth

Ancylosis velessa is a species of snout moth in the genus Ancylosis. It was described by Harrison Gray Dyar Jr. in 1914. It is found in Panama.
