= Ancylosis iranella =

Scientific classification
- Domain: Eukaryota
- Kingdom: Animalia
- Phylum: Arthropoda
- Class: Insecta
- Order: Lepidoptera
- Family: Pyralidae
- Genus: Ancylosis
- Species: A. iranella

Binomial name
- Ancylosis iranella Ragonot, 1887

Species of moth

Ancylosis iranella is a species of snout moth in the genus Ancylosis. It was described by Émile Louis Ragonot in 1887, and was described from Iran, from which its species epithet is derived. It is also found in Turkey.

The wingspan is about 30 mm.
