= Ancylosis dryadella =

Scientific classification
- Domain: Eukaryota
- Kingdom: Animalia
- Phylum: Arthropoda
- Class: Insecta
- Order: Lepidoptera
- Family: Pyralidae
- Genus: Ancylosis
- Species: A. dryadella

Binomial name
- Ancylosis dryadella (Ragonot, 1887)

Synonyms
- Heterographis dryadella Ragonot, 1887

Species of moth

Ancylosis dryadella is a species of snout moth in the genus Ancylosis. It was described by Ragonot, in 1887, and is known from Russia and China.
