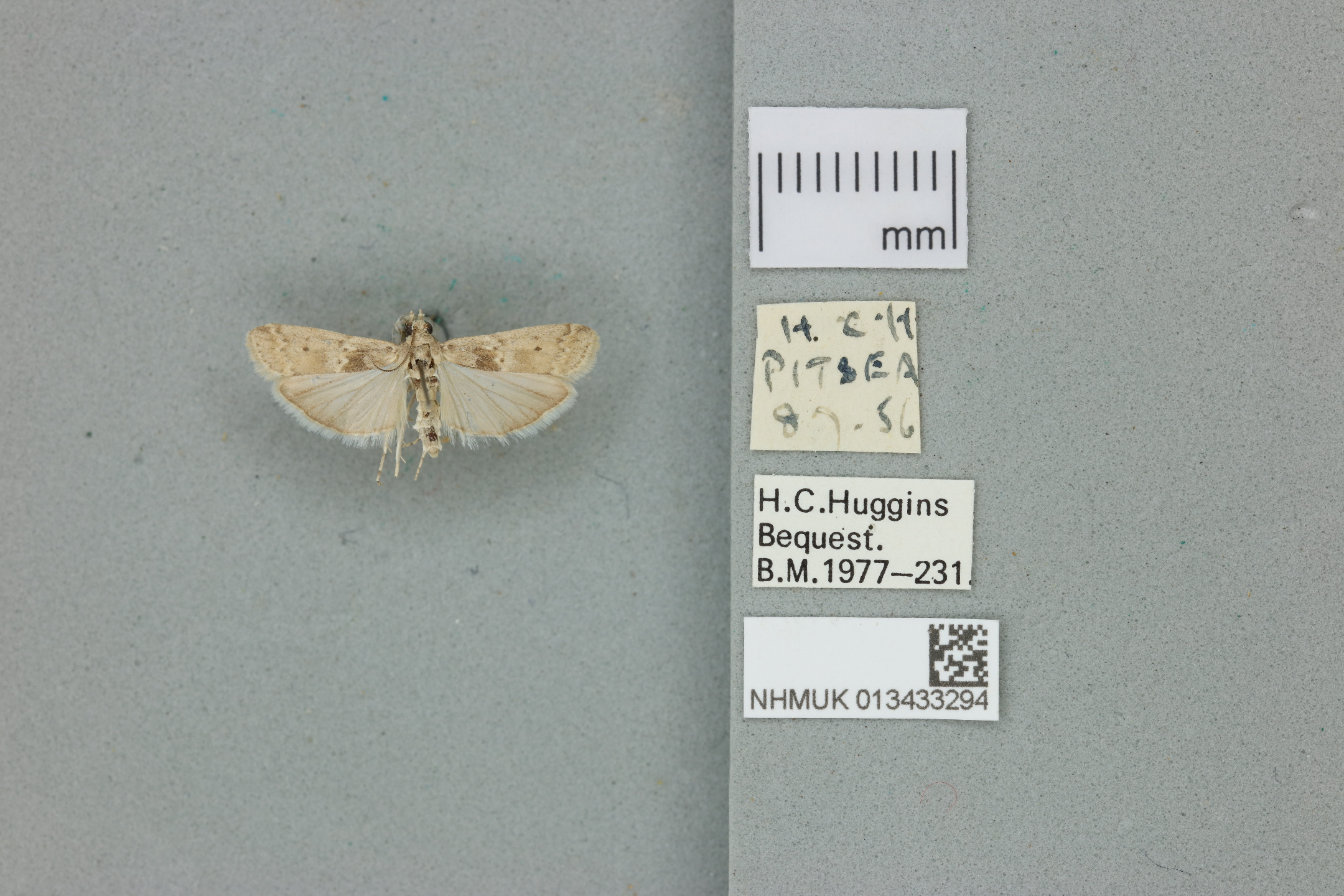
- Adult, pinned specimen of Ancylosis oblitella

Scientific classification
- Kingdom: Animalia
- Phylum: Arthropoda
- Clade: Pancrustacea
- Class: Insecta
- Order: Lepidoptera
- Family: Pyralidae
- Genus: Ancylosis
- Species: A. oblitella

Binomial name
- Ancylosis oblitella (Zeller, 1848)

Synonyms
- Ephestia oblitella Zeller, 1848

= Ancylosis oblitella =

Species of moth

Ancylosis oblitella is a species of snout moth in the genus Ancylosis. It was described by Philipp Christoph Zeller in 1848. It is found in most of Europe.

The wingspan is 18–22 mm. Adults are on wing in May and again from July to August in two generations per year.

The larvae feed on Chenopodium species.
