= Ancylosis pyrethrella =

Scientific classification
- Domain: Eukaryota
- Kingdom: Animalia
- Phylum: Arthropoda
- Class: Insecta
- Order: Lepidoptera
- Family: Pyralidae
- Genus: Ancylosis
- Species: A. pyrethrella

Binomial name
- Ancylosis pyrethrella (Herrich-Schäffer, 1860)

Synonyms
- Acrobasis pyrethrella Herrich-Schäffer, 1860; Heterographis ignibasella Ragonot, 1887

Species of moth

Ancylosis pyrethrella is a species of snout moth in the genus Ancylosis. It was described by Gottlieb August Wilhelm Herrich-Schäffer in 1860. It is found in Romania, Russia and Turkey.
