= Ancylosis nigripunctella =

Scientific classification
- Kingdom: Animalia
- Phylum: Arthropoda
- Clade: Pancrustacea
- Class: Insecta
- Order: Lepidoptera
- Family: Pyralidae
- Genus: Ancylosis
- Species: A. nigripunctella

Binomial name
- Ancylosis nigripunctella (Staudinger, 1879)

Synonyms
- Myelois nigripunctella Staudinger, 1879; Heterographis wockeella Ragonot, 1887; Heterographis carnibasalis Hampson, 1896

Species of moth

Ancylosis nigripunctella is a species of snout moth in the genus Ancylosis. It was described in 1879 by Staudinger based on material collected by H. G. Henke in the Ryn-Peski Desert ("Rün Peski") in Western Kazakhstan. It is reported from Kazakhstan, Egypt and Turkey.

The species must not be confused with Ancylosis nigripunctella (Amsel, 1959), which is a secondary junior homonym of Ancylosis nigripunctella (Staudinger, 1879). The replacement name for the junior homonym of Amsel is Ancylosis obscuripunctella Roesler, 1973.

The wingspan is about 16 mm.
