= Ancylosis leucocephala =

Scientific classification
- Domain: Eukaryota
- Kingdom: Animalia
- Phylum: Arthropoda
- Class: Insecta
- Order: Lepidoptera
- Family: Pyralidae
- Genus: Ancylosis
- Species: A. leucocephala

Binomial name
- Ancylosis leucocephala (Staudinger, 1879)

Synonyms
- Myelois leucocephala Staudinger, 1879

Species of moth

Ancylosis leucocephala is a species of snout moth in the genus Ancylosis. It was described by Staudinger, in 1879. It is found in Russia and Romania.

The wingspan is about 19 mm.
