= Epischnia muscidella =

Scientific classification
- Kingdom: Animalia
- Phylum: Arthropoda
- Clade: Pancrustacea
- Class: Insecta
- Order: Lepidoptera
- Family: Pyralidae
- Genus: Epischnia
- Species: E. muscidella

Binomial name
- Epischnia muscidella Ragonot, 1887

Species of moth

Epischnia muscidella is a species of snout moth in the genus Epischnia. It was described by Ragonot in 1887, and is known from Turkey.
