= Ancylosis monella =

Scientific classification
- Domain: Eukaryota
- Kingdom: Animalia
- Phylum: Arthropoda
- Class: Insecta
- Order: Lepidoptera
- Family: Pyralidae
- Genus: Ancylosis
- Species: A. monella

Binomial name
- Ancylosis monella (Roesler, 1973)

Synonyms
- Staudingeria monella Roesler, 1973

Species of moth

Ancylosis monella is a species of snout moth in the genus Ancylosis. It was described by Roesler in 1973 from Afghanistan, but is also found on Cyprus.
