= Epischnia hesperidella =

Scientific classification
- Kingdom: Animalia
- Phylum: Arthropoda
- Clade: Pancrustacea
- Class: Insecta
- Order: Lepidoptera
- Family: Pyralidae
- Genus: Epischnia
- Species: E. hesperidella

Binomial name
- Epischnia hesperidella Rebel, 1917

Species of moth

Epischnia hesperidella is a species of snout moth in the genus Epischnia. It was described by Rebel in 1917. It is found on the Canary Islands.
