= Ancylosis syrtella =

Scientific classification
- Domain: Eukaryota
- Kingdom: Animalia
- Phylum: Arthropoda
- Class: Insecta
- Order: Lepidoptera
- Family: Pyralidae
- Genus: Ancylosis
- Species: A. syrtella

Binomial name
- Ancylosis syrtella (Ragonot, 1887)

Synonyms
- Heterographis syrtella Ragonot, 1887

Species of moth

Ancylosis syrtella is a species of snout moth in the genus Ancylosis. It was described by Ragonot in 1887. It is found in Russia.

The wingspan is about 18 mm.
