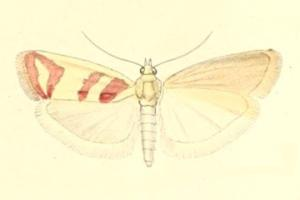

Scientific classification
- Domain: Eukaryota
- Kingdom: Animalia
- Phylum: Arthropoda
- Class: Insecta
- Order: Lepidoptera
- Family: Pyralidae
- Genus: Ancylosis
- Species: A. hellenica

Binomial name
- Ancylosis hellenica (Staudinger, 1871)

Synonyms
- Myelois rhodochrella var. hellenica Staudinger, 1871

= Ancylosis hellenica =

Species of moth

Ancylosis hellenica is a species of snout moth in the genus Ancylosis. It was described by Otto Staudinger, in 1871, and is known from Greece, Bulgaria, North Macedonia and Turkey.
