= Epischnia beharella =

Scientific classification
- Kingdom: Animalia
- Phylum: Arthropoda
- Clade: Pancrustacea
- Class: Insecta
- Order: Lepidoptera
- Family: Pyralidae
- Genus: Epischnia
- Species: E. beharella

Binomial name
- Epischnia beharella (Viette, 1964)

Synonyms
- Nephopterix beharella Viette, 1964

Species of moth

Epischnia beharella is a species of snout moth in the genus Epischnia. It was described by Viette in 1964, and is known from Madagascar and La Réunion.

The larvae feed on Annona reticulata.
