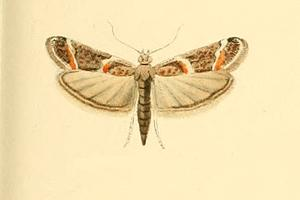

Scientific classification
- Kingdom: Animalia
- Phylum: Arthropoda
- Clade: Pancrustacea
- Class: Insecta
- Order: Lepidoptera
- Family: Pyralidae
- Genus: Ancylosis
- Species: A. samaritanella

Binomial name
- Ancylosis samaritanella (Zeller, 1867)

Synonyms
- Euzophera samaritanella Zeller, 1867

= Ancylosis samaritanella =

Species of moth

Ancylosis samaritanella is a species of snout moth in the genus Ancylosis. It was described by Zeller in 1867. It is found in Spain, Russia, Turkey, Jordan, the Canary Islands, Morocco, Algeria, Tunisia, Libya, Egypt, Sudan, Saudi Arabia, Turkestan and Central Asia.

Adults are small with narrow forewings. They are whitish, dusted with blackish with two paler transverse lines. The hindwings are whitish with a grey margin.
