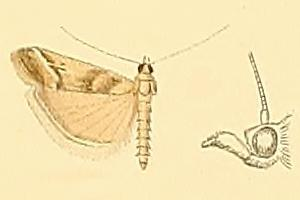

Scientific classification
- Kingdom: Animalia
- Phylum: Arthropoda
- Class: Insecta
- Order: Lepidoptera
- Family: Pyralidae
- Genus: Ancylosis
- Species: A. imitella

Binomial name
- Ancylosis imitella Hampson in Ragonot, 1901

= Ancylosis imitella =

Species of moth

Ancylosis imitella is a species of snout moth in the genus Ancylosis. It was described by George Hampson in 1901. It is found in Spain, France, Sardinia, Corsica, Sicily and Albania.

The wingspan is about 22 mm.
