= Epischnia maracandella =

Scientific classification
- Kingdom: Animalia
- Phylum: Arthropoda
- Clade: Pancrustacea
- Class: Insecta
- Order: Lepidoptera
- Family: Pyralidae
- Genus: Epischnia
- Species: E. maracandella

Binomial name
- Epischnia maracandella Ragonot, 1887

Species of moth

Epischnia maracandella is a species of snout moth in the genus Epischnia. It was described by Émile Louis Ragonot in 1887, and is known from Uzbekistan.
