= Epischnia christophori =

Scientific classification
- Kingdom: Animalia
- Phylum: Arthropoda
- Clade: Pancrustacea
- Class: Insecta
- Order: Lepidoptera
- Family: Pyralidae
- Genus: Epischnia
- Species: E. christophori

Binomial name
- Epischnia christophori Ragonot, 1887

Species of moth

Epischnia christophori is a species of snout moth in the genus Epischnia. It was described by Émile Louis Ragonot in 1887, and is known from Armenia.
