= Ancylosis rufifasciella =

Scientific classification
- Kingdom: Animalia
- Phylum: Arthropoda
- Class: Insecta
- Order: Lepidoptera
- Family: Pyralidae
- Genus: Ancylosis
- Species: A. rufifasciella

Binomial name
- Ancylosis rufifasciella (Hampson, 1901)

Synonyms
- Hypogryphia rufifasciella Hampson, 1901

Species of moth

Ancylosis rufifasciella is a species of snout moth in the genus Ancylosis. It was described by George Hampson in 1901 and is known from Australia.
