= Ancylosis ocellella =

Scientific classification
- Kingdom: Animalia
- Phylum: Arthropoda
- Class: Insecta
- Order: Lepidoptera
- Family: Pyralidae
- Genus: Ancylosis
- Species: A. ocellella

Binomial name
- Ancylosis ocellella (Ragonot, 1901)

Synonyms
- Heterographis ocellella Ragonot, 1901

Species of moth

Ancylosis ocellella is a species of snout moth in the genus Ancylosis. It was described by Ragonot, in 1901, and is known from South Africa and Namibia.
