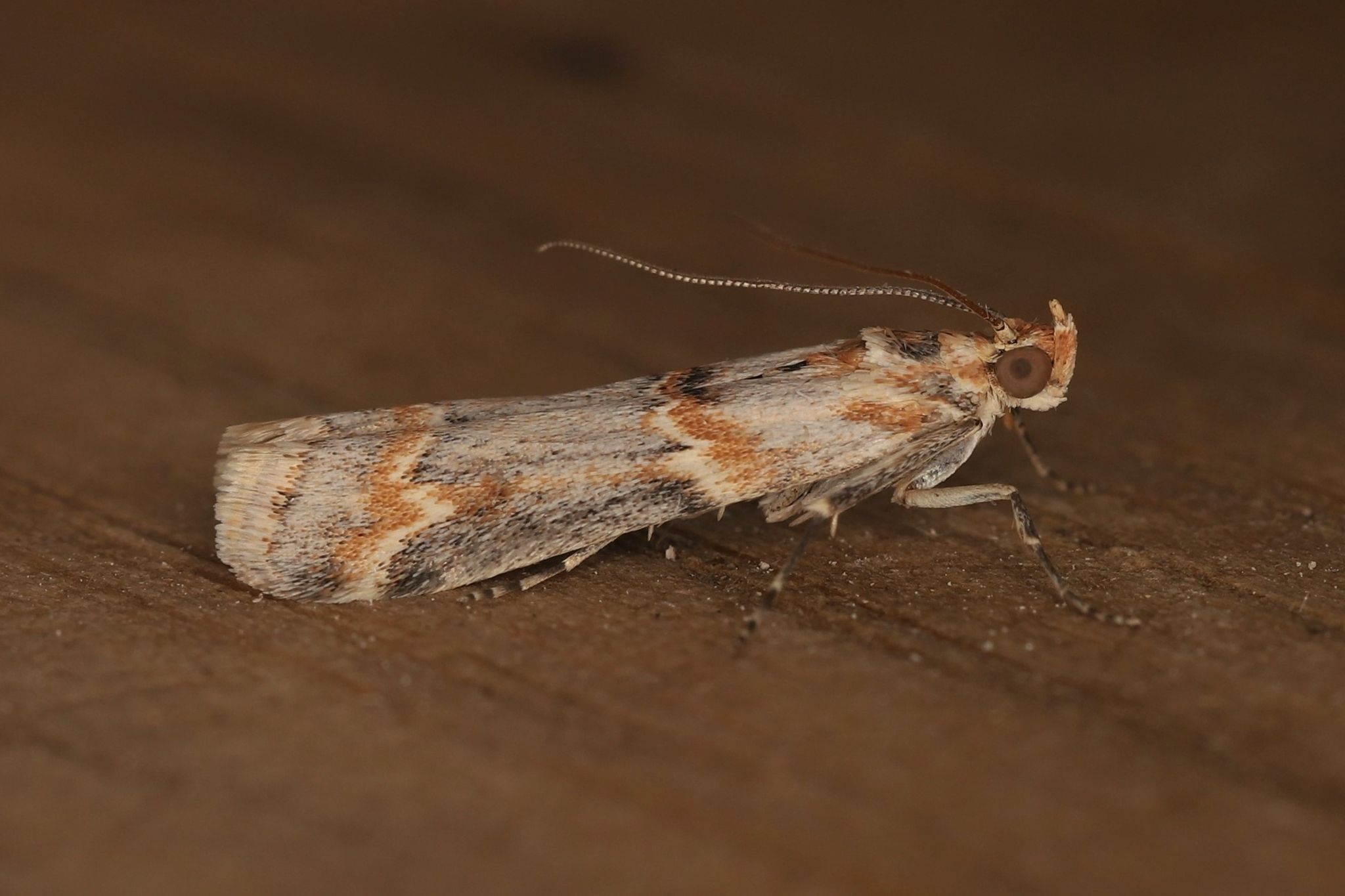

Scientific classification
- Domain: Eukaryota
- Kingdom: Animalia
- Phylum: Arthropoda
- Class: Insecta
- Order: Lepidoptera
- Family: Pyralidae
- Genus: Ancylosis
- Species: A. harmoniella

Binomial name
- Ancylosis harmoniella (Ragonot, 1887)

Synonyms
- Heterographis harmoniella Ragonot, 1887; Heterographis ochrotaeniella Ragonot, 1887; Heterographis diffusella Turati, 1930

= Ancylosis harmoniella =

Species of moth

Ancylosis harmoniella is a species of snout moth. It was described by Émile Louis Ragonot in 1887. It occurs in North Africa (Morocco, Algeria, Tunisia, Libya, Egypt), the Canary Islands, the Mediterranean Europe (Spain, Malta, southern France), the Middle East (Turkey, Syria, the Palestinian Territories, Saudi Arabia, Iraq, Iran), Afghanistan, and Transcaucasia (Azerbaijan).

The wingspan is about 18–19.5 mm (0.71–0.77 in).
