= Ancylosis griseomixtella =

Scientific classification
- Domain: Eukaryota
- Kingdom: Animalia
- Phylum: Arthropoda
- Class: Insecta
- Order: Lepidoptera
- Family: Pyralidae
- Genus: Ancylosis
- Species: A. griseomixtella

Binomial name
- Ancylosis griseomixtella (Ragonot, 1887)

Synonyms
- Ancylodes griseomixtella Ragonot, 1887

Species of moth

Ancylosis griseomixtella is a species of snout moth in the genus Ancylosis. It was described by Émile Louis Ragonot in 1887. It is found in China.

The wingspan is 24–30 mm.
