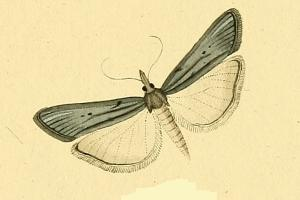

Scientific classification
- Kingdom: Animalia
- Phylum: Arthropoda
- Clade: Pancrustacea
- Class: Insecta
- Order: Lepidoptera
- Family: Pyralidae
- Genus: Epischnia
- Species: E. prodromella

Binomial name
- Epischnia prodromella (Hübner, 1799)

Synonyms
- Tinea prodromella Hübner, 1796

= Epischnia prodromella =

Species of moth

Epischnia prodromella is a species of snout moth in the genus Epischnia. It was described by Jacob Hübner in 1799, and is known from North Africa and most of Europe, except Fennoscandia, Ireland, Great Britain and the Baltic region.

The wingspan is 28–35 mm.
