= Ancylosis eremicola =

Scientific classification
- Domain: Eukaryota
- Kingdom: Animalia
- Phylum: Arthropoda
- Class: Insecta
- Order: Lepidoptera
- Family: Pyralidae
- Genus: Ancylosis
- Species: A. eremicola

Binomial name
- Ancylosis eremicola (Amsel, 1935)

Synonyms
- Cornigerula eremicola Amsel, 1935

Species of moth

Ancylosis eremicola is a species of snout moth in the genus Ancylosis. It was described by Hans Georg Amsel in 1935, and is known from Israel.
