= Ancylosis deserticola =

Scientific classification
- Domain: Eukaryota
- Kingdom: Animalia
- Phylum: Arthropoda
- Class: Insecta
- Order: Lepidoptera
- Family: Pyralidae
- Genus: Ancylosis
- Species: A. deserticola

Binomial name
- Ancylosis deserticola (Staudinger, 1870)

Synonyms
- Myelois deserticola Staudinger, 1870

Species of moth

Ancylosis deserticola is a species of snout moth in the genus Ancylosis. It was described by Staudinger, in 1870. It is found in Spain, Hungary, Romania, Bulgaria and Russia.

The wingspan is 14–17 mm.
