= Ancylosis pallidimarginalis =

Scientific classification
- Domain: Eukaryota
- Kingdom: Animalia
- Phylum: Arthropoda
- Class: Insecta
- Order: Lepidoptera
- Family: Pyralidae
- Genus: Ancylosis
- Species: A. pallidimarginalis

Binomial name
- Ancylosis pallidimarginalis (Rothschild, 1915)

Synonyms
- Diviana pallidimarginalis Rothschild, 1915

Species of moth

Ancylosis pallidimarginalis is a species of snout moth in the genus Ancylosis. It was described by Walter Rothschild in 1915, and is known from Algeria.

The wingspan is 23 mm.
