= Ancylosis pectinatella =

Scientific classification
- Kingdom: Animalia
- Phylum: Arthropoda
- Clade: Pancrustacea
- Class: Insecta
- Order: Lepidoptera
- Family: Pyralidae
- Genus: Ancylosis
- Species: A. pectinatella

Binomial name
- Ancylosis pectinatella (Ragonot, 1887)

Synonyms
- Heterographis pectinatella Ragonot, 1887

Species of moth

Ancylosis pectinatella is a species of snout moth. It was first described by Ragonot, in 1887, and is known from Uzbekistan, Spain and Turkey.

The wingspan is about 22 mm.
