= Ancylosis gracilella =

Scientific classification
- Kingdom: Animalia
- Phylum: Arthropoda
- Class: Insecta
- Order: Lepidoptera
- Family: Pyralidae
- Genus: Ancylosis
- Species: A. gracilella

Binomial name
- Ancylosis gracilella (Ragonot, 1887)

Synonyms
- Heterographis gracilella Ragonot, 1887; Heterographis subcandidatella Ragonot, 1887; Heterographis monostictella Ragonot, 1887

Species of moth

Ancylosis gracilella is a species of snout moth in the genus Ancylosis. It was described by Émile Louis Ragonot, in 1887. It is found in Spain and North Macedonia, as well as Turkey.

The wingspan is 14–17 mm.
