= Ancylosis trimaculella =

Scientific classification
- Domain: Eukaryota
- Kingdom: Animalia
- Phylum: Arthropoda
- Class: Insecta
- Order: Lepidoptera
- Family: Pyralidae
- Genus: Ancylosis
- Species: A. trimaculella

Binomial name
- Ancylosis trimaculella (D. Lucas, 1943)

Synonyms
- Heterographis trimaculella D. Lucas, 1943

Species of moth

Ancylosis trimaculella is a species of snout moth in the genus Ancylosis. It was described by Daniel Lucas in 1943 and is known from Tunisia.
