= Epischnia oculatella =

Scientific classification
- Kingdom: Animalia
- Phylum: Arthropoda
- Clade: Pancrustacea
- Class: Insecta
- Order: Lepidoptera
- Family: Pyralidae
- Genus: Epischnia
- Species: E. oculatella

Binomial name
- Epischnia oculatella Ragonot, 1887

Species of moth

Epischnia oculatella is a species of snout moth in the genus Epischnia. It was described by Ragonot in 1887. It is found in Iran.

The wingspan is about 26 mm.
