= Ancylosis biflexella =

Scientific classification
- Domain: Eukaryota
- Kingdom: Animalia
- Phylum: Arthropoda
- Class: Insecta
- Order: Lepidoptera
- Family: Pyralidae
- Genus: Ancylosis
- Species: A. biflexella

Binomial name
- Ancylosis biflexella (Lederer, 1855)

Synonyms
- Myelois biflexella Lederer, 1855; Euzophera pilosella Zeller, 1867; Heterographis brabantella D. Lucas, 1907; Heterographis latakiella Amsel, 1952; Staudingeria similis Rothschild, 1915; Syria biflexella fuscella Amsel, 1961

Species of moth

Ancylosis biflexella is a species of snout moth in the genus Ancylosis. It was described by Julius Lederer in 1855, and is known from Niger, Tunisia, Algeria, Israel, Lebanon, Iran, Cyprus and the Canary Islands.
