= Ancylosis sulcatella =

Scientific classification
- Kingdom: Animalia
- Phylum: Arthropoda
- Class: Insecta
- Order: Lepidoptera
- Family: Pyralidae
- Genus: Ancylosis
- Species: A. sulcatella

Binomial name
- Ancylosis sulcatella (Christoph, 1877)

Synonyms
- Epischnia sulcatella Christoph, 1877; Syria sulcatella; Hedemannia lineatella Ragonot, 1887

Species of moth

Ancylosis sulcatella is a species of snout moth in the genus Ancylosis. It was described by Hugo Theodor Christoph in 1877, and is known from Turkmenistan, Syria and Israel.
