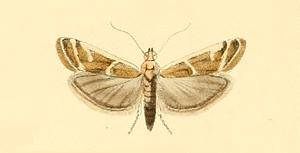

Scientific classification
- Kingdom: Animalia
- Phylum: Arthropoda
- Clade: Pancrustacea
- Class: Insecta
- Order: Lepidoptera
- Family: Pyralidae
- Genus: Ancylosis
- Species: A. faustinella

Binomial name
- Ancylosis faustinella (Zeller, 1867)

Synonyms
- Euzophera faustinella Zeller, 1867; Heterographis faustinella; Acornigerula bilineella Amsel, 1935; Heterographis airensis Rothschild, 1921; Heterographis damascenella Amsel, 1952; Heterographis rubripictella Hampson, 1896; Myelois staudingeri Christoph, 1877; Heterographis thalerella Mabille, 1908; Staudingeria variabilis Rothschild, 1915

= Ancylosis faustinella =

Species of moth

Ancylosis faustinella is a species of snout moth in the genus Ancylosis. It was described by Philipp Christoph Zeller, in 1867 from Palestine, but is also found on Malta and in Russia, as well as on the Canary Islands, in Algeria, Tunisia, Libya, Morocco, Egypt, Saudi Arabia, Yemen, Bahrain, Turkey, Afghanistan, Syria, Iran, Israel, Jordan, Lebanon, Mongolia, Pakistan, Niger and Sudan.

Adults are small, with narrow ochreous yellow forewings. It has a white costal streak and two white transverse lines. The hindwings are pale grey.
