= Leuthneria =

Scientific classification
- Kingdom: Animalia
- Phylum: Arthropoda
- Class: Insecta
- Order: Lepidoptera
- Family: Sesiidae
- Genus: Leuthneria; Dalla Torre, 1925
- Species: L. ruficincta

Binomial name
- Leuthneria ruficincta (Felder, 1874)

Synonyms
- Eublepharis ruficincta Felder, 1874; Melittia ruficincta

Genus of moths

Leuthneria is a genus of moths in the family Sesiidae containing only one species Leuthneria ruficincta, which is known from Sudan.
