= Ancylosis yerburii =

Scientific classification
- Kingdom: Animalia
- Phylum: Arthropoda
- Class: Insecta
- Order: Lepidoptera
- Family: Pyralidae
- Genus: Ancylosis
- Species: A. yerburii

Binomial name
- Ancylosis yerburii (Butler, 1884)

Synonyms
- Mella yerburii Butler, 1884; Staudingeria yerburii; Heterographis costalbella Mabille, 1906; Heterographis innotalis Hampson, 1899; Heterographis rubronervella Mabille, 1908; Lymira lactealis Rothschild, 1913; Lymire strictipennis Rothschild, 1915; Staudingeria cinnammomella Rothschild, 1915; Staudingeria khuzistanella Amsel, 1959; Staudingeria khuzistanella benderella Amsel, 1961; Staudingeria labeculella Ragonot, 1887; Staudingeria labeculella ab. pallidicostella Chrétien, 1910; Staudingeria pruinosella Chrétien, 1911; Staudingeria rühli ruehli Gozmány, 1959; Syria vinosparsella Turati, 1924

Species of moth

Ancylosis yerburii is a species of snout moth in the genus Ancylosis. It was described by Arthur Gardiner Butler in 1884 and is known from Iran, Yemen, Algeria, Tunisia, Libya, Morocco, Egypt, Saudi Arabia, Bahrain, Israel, Palestine, Jordan, Sudan and Cyprus

The larvae feed on Limoniastrum guyonianum and Statice pruinosa.
