= Epischnia albella =

Scientific classification
- Kingdom: Animalia
- Phylum: Arthropoda
- Clade: Pancrustacea
- Class: Insecta
- Order: Lepidoptera
- Family: Pyralidae
- Genus: Epischnia
- Species: E. albella

Binomial name
- Epischnia albella Amsel, 1954

Species of moth

Epischnia albella is a species of snout moth in the genus Epischnia. It was described by Hans Georg Amsel in 1954, and is known from Egypt the Palestinian territories and the United Arab Emirates.
