= Ancylosis albifrontella =

Scientific classification
- Domain: Eukaryota
- Kingdom: Animalia
- Phylum: Arthropoda
- Class: Insecta
- Order: Lepidoptera
- Family: Pyralidae
- Genus: Ancylosis
- Species: A. albifrontella

Binomial name
- Ancylosis albifrontella (Asselbergs, 2010)

Synonyms
- Staudingeria albifrontella Asselbergs, 2010

Species of moth

Ancylosis albifrontella is a species of snout moth in the genus Ancylosis. It was described by Jan Asselbergs in 2010 and is known from the United Arab Emirates.
