= Ancylosis ochraceella =

Scientific classification
- Domain: Eukaryota
- Kingdom: Animalia
- Phylum: Arthropoda
- Class: Insecta
- Order: Lepidoptera
- Family: Pyralidae
- Genus: Ancylosis
- Species: A. ochraceella

Binomial name
- Ancylosis ochraceella Asselbergs, 2008

Species of moth

Ancylosis ochraceella is a species of snout moth in the genus Ancylosis. It was described by Jan Asselbergs in 2008 and is known from the United Arab Emirates.
