= Syringia pectinatella =

Scientific classification
- Kingdom: Animalia
- Phylum: Arthropoda
- Clade: Pancrustacea
- Class: Insecta
- Order: Lepidoptera
- Family: Pyralidae
- Genus: Syringia
- Species: S. pectinatella

Binomial name
- Syringia pectinatella (de Joannis, 1915)

Synonyms
- Spatulipalpia pectinatella Joannis, 1915; Ancylosis pectinatella (Joannis, 1915); Spatulipalpia ambahonella Viette, 1964

Species of moth

Syringia pectinatella is a species of snout moth in the subfamily Phycitinae. It was first described by Joseph de Joannis in 1915 and is known from Mauritius.

== Description ==
The wingspan of this species is 23 mm. Its larvae had been found in February on sugar-apples (Annona squamosa).
