= Ancylosis partitella =

Scientific classification
- Kingdom: Animalia
- Phylum: Arthropoda
- Class: Insecta
- Order: Lepidoptera
- Family: Pyralidae
- Genus: Ancylosis
- Species: A. partitella

Binomial name
- Ancylosis partitella (Ragonot, 1887)

Synonyms
- Staudingeria partitella Ragonot, 1887; Staudingeria adustella Ragonot, 1887

Species of moth

Ancylosis partitella is a species of snout moth in the genus Ancylosis. It was described by Ragonot, in 1887. It is found in Malta, Russia, Kazakhstan, Algeria, Iran, Syria, Saudi Arabia and the United Arab Emirates.

The wingspan is about 15 mm.
