= Philagraulella =

Scientific classification
- Kingdom: Animalia
- Phylum: Arthropoda
- Clade: Pancrustacea
- Class: Insecta
- Order: Lepidoptera
- Family: Tineidae
- Genus: Philagraulella; T. B. Fletcher, 1940
- Species: P. punica

Binomial name
- Philagraulella punica (Meyrick, 1930)

Synonyms
- Genus: Philagraula Meyrick, 1930; Species: Philagraula punica Meyrick, 1930

Genus of moths

Philagraulella is a genus of moths belonging to the family Tineidae. It contains only one species, Philagraulella punica, which is found in Sudan.
