= Ancylosis aspilatella =

Scientific classification
- Kingdom: Animalia
- Phylum: Arthropoda
- Class: Insecta
- Order: Lepidoptera
- Family: Pyralidae
- Genus: Ancylosis
- Species: A. aspilatella

Binomial name
- Ancylosis aspilatella (Ragonot, 1887)

Synonyms
- Heterographis aspilatella Ragonot, 1887; Staudingeria aspilatella

Species of moth

Ancylosis aspilatella is a species of snout moth in the genus Ancylosis. It was described by Ragonot, in 1887, and is known from Russia (Ural Mountains), Kazakhstan, Turkmenistan, Afghanistan, Iran, Bahrain, the United Arab Emirates, Algeria, Egypt and Tunisia.

The wingspan is about 17 mm.
