= Epischnia cinerosalis =

Scientific classification
- Kingdom: Animalia
- Phylum: Arthropoda
- Clade: Pancrustacea
- Class: Insecta
- Order: Lepidoptera
- Family: Pyralidae
- Genus: Epischnia
- Species: E. cinerosalis

Binomial name
- Epischnia cinerosalis Walker & Rothschild, 1905

Species of moth

Epischnia cinerosalis is a species of snout moth in the genus Epischnia. It was described by Francis Walker and Walter Rothschild in 1905. It is found in Sudan.
