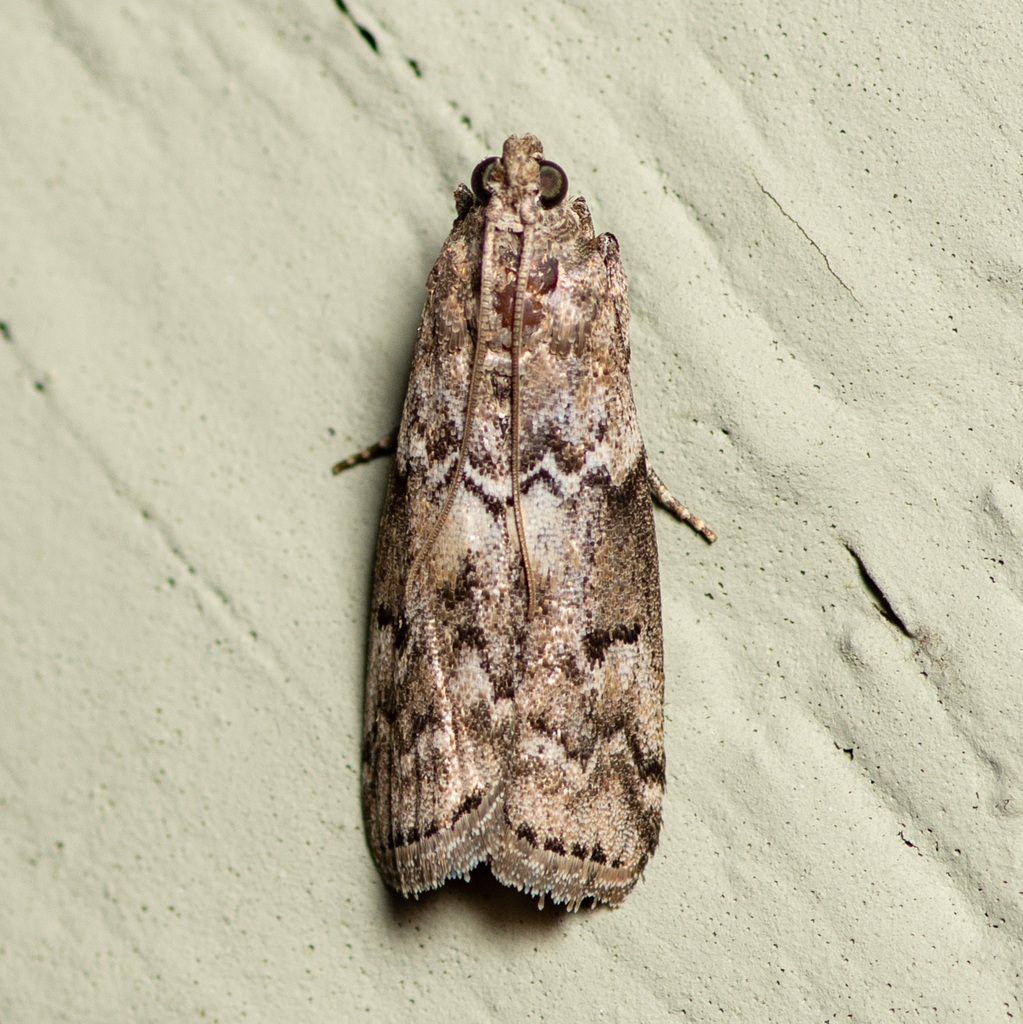

Scientific classification
- Kingdom: Animalia
- Phylum: Arthropoda
- Class: Insecta
- Order: Lepidoptera
- Family: Pyralidae
- Tribe: Phycitini
- Genus: Canarsia; Hulst, 1890
- Species: C. ulmiarrosorella

Binomial name
- Canarsia ulmiarrosorella (Clemens, 1860)

Synonyms
- Nephopteryx ulmiarrosorella Clemens, 1860; Stenoptycha pneumatella Hulst, 1887; Psorosa ulmella Ragonot, 1887; Honora fuscatella Hulst, 1888; Canarsia gracilella Hulst, 1900; Canarsia feliculella Dyar, 1907; Canarsiana discocellularis Strand, 1920; Ancylosis discocellularis

= Canarsia =

Genus of moths

Canarsia is a monotypic snout moth genus described by George Duryea Hulst in 1890. Its one species, described by James Brackenridge Clemens in 1860, is Canarsia ulmiarrosorella, the elm leaftier moth. It is found in North America including Massachusetts, Alabama and Oklahoma.

The wingspan is about 17 mm. The larvae feed on Ulmus rubra.
