= Scopula similata =

Scientific classification
- Kingdom: Animalia
- Phylum: Arthropoda
- Clade: Pancrustacea
- Class: Insecta
- Order: Lepidoptera
- Family: Geometridae
- Genus: Scopula
- Species: S. similata

Binomial name
- Scopula similata (Le Cerf, 1924)

Synonyms
- Glossotrophia similata Le Cerf, 1924

Species of geometer moth in subfamily Sterrhinae

Scopula similata is a moth of the family Geometridae. It is found in the United Arab Emirates.
