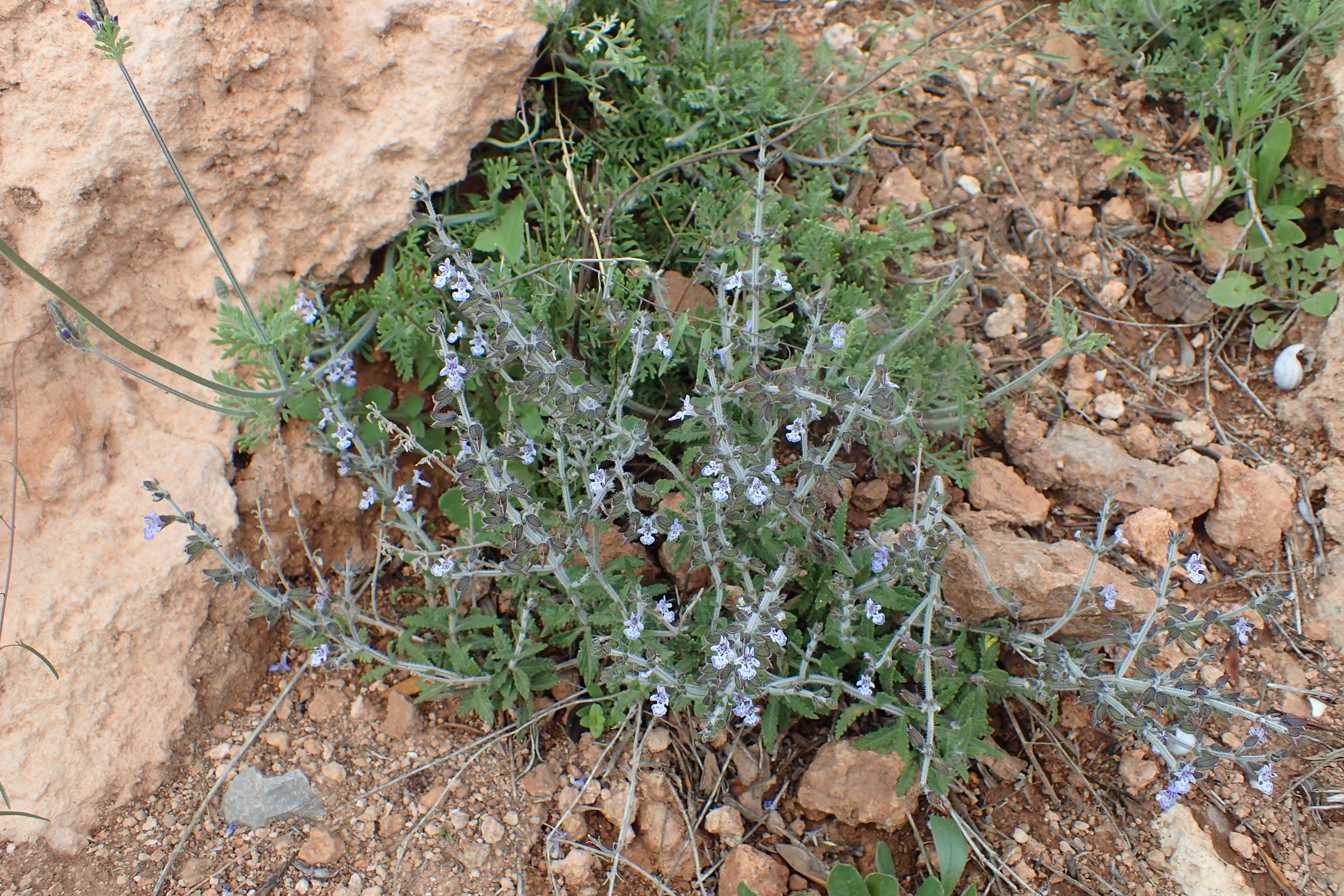

Scientific classification
- Kingdom: Plantae
- Clade: Tracheophytes
- Clade: Angiosperms
- Clade: Eudicots
- Clade: Asterids
- Order: Lamiales
- Family: Lamiaceae
- Genus: Salvia
- Species: S. aegyptiaca

Binomial name
- Salvia aegyptiaca L.

= Salvia aegyptiaca =

Species of flowering plant

Salvia aegyptiaca, the Egyptian sage, is a herbaceous plant species of the family Lamiaceae.

== Distribution ==
Salvia aegyptiaca is found in the Cape Verde Islands, Canary Islands, NW and N. Africa, Sudan, Ethiopia, Arabian Peninsula, Iran, Afghanistan, Pakistan, India.

== Morphology ==
It is herbaceous, with erect-ascending stems. The leaves are oblong to linear-elliptic, rugulose, serrated. This species has inflorescences of simple racemes, sometimes branched. Bracts are present. The corolla has a blue-violet color.

== Pharmacognosy ==
Salvia aegyptiaca has been studied due to its uses in folk medicine in the Old World to treat diarrhoea, gonorrhoea and haemorrhoids, plus it has been used as demulcent, antispasmodic, cicatrizant, antiseptic and stomachic. Its non-polar extracts have been tested as antimicrobial and these presented inhibitory activity against Bacillus subtilis, Pseudomonas aeruginosa, Candida albicans and Staphylococcus aureus.

6-Methylcryptoacetalide, aegyptinones A and B, 6-methyl-epicryptoacetalide and 6-methylcryptotanshinone have been isolated from this species.

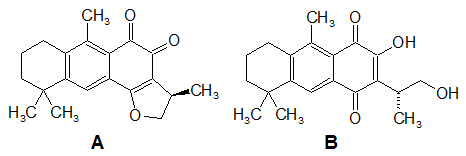
Aegyptinones
