= Elachista veruta =

Scientific classification
- Kingdom: Animalia
- Phylum: Arthropoda
- Class: Insecta
- Order: Lepidoptera
- Family: Elachistidae
- Genus: Elachista
- Species: E. veruta

Binomial name
- Elachista veruta Kaila, 2008

Species of moth

Elachista veruta is a moth of the family Elachistidae. It is found in the United Arab Emirates.
