= Ancylosis costistrigella =

Scientific classification
- Domain: Eukaryota
- Kingdom: Animalia
- Phylum: Arthropoda
- Class: Insecta
- Order: Lepidoptera
- Family: Pyralidae
- Genus: Ancylosis
- Species: A. costistrigella

Binomial name
- Ancylosis costistrigella (Ragonot, 1890)

Synonyms
- Heterographis costistrigella Ragonot, 1890

Species of moth

Ancylosis costistrigella is a species of snout moth in the genus Ancylosis. It was described by Ragonot, in 1890, and is known from the Canary Islands., Algeria, Tunisia, Morocco, Israel, Iran, Afghanistan, Bahrain, the United Arab Emirates and Sudan.

The larvae feed on Salvia aegyptiaca.
