= Coleophora safadella =

Scientific classification
- Kingdom: Animalia
- Phylum: Arthropoda
- Clade: Pancrustacea
- Class: Insecta
- Order: Lepidoptera
- Family: Coleophoridae
- Genus: Coleophora
- Species: C. safadella

Binomial name
- Coleophora safadella van der Wolf, 2008

Species of moth

Coleophora safadella is a moth of the family Coleophoridae. It is found in the United Arab Emirates.

== Taxonomy ==
It was described by Hugo van der Wolf in 2008 in the first volume of Arthropod Fauna of the UAE. The male holotype was collected by C. Gielis in Wadi Safad, Fujairah, at 150 m on 10–11 April 2006, and is held in the Naturalis Biodiversity Center (RMNH).
