= Agrotis sardzeana =

Scientific classification
- Kingdom: Animalia
- Phylum: Arthropoda
- Clade: Pancrustacea
- Class: Insecta
- Order: Lepidoptera
- Superfamily: Noctuoidea
- Family: Noctuidae
- Genus: Agrotis
- Species: A. sardzeana

Binomial name
- Agrotis sardzeana Brandt, 1941

Synonyms
- Agrotis sardzeana saharae Pinker, 1974

Species of moth

Agrotis sardzeana is a moth of the family Noctuidae. It is found in the eremic zone from North Africa to the Arabian Peninsula to Pakistan and India.

Adults are on wing from October to December. There is one generation per year.
