= Gisilia sclerodes =

Scientific classification
- Kingdom: Animalia
- Phylum: Arthropoda
- Class: Insecta
- Order: Lepidoptera
- Family: Cosmopterigidae
- Genus: Gisilia
- Species: G. sclerodes

Binomial name
- Gisilia sclerodes (Meyrick, 1909)

Synonyms
- Stagmatophora sclerodes Meyrick, 1909

Species of moth

Gisilia sclerodes is a moth in the family Cosmopterigidae. It is found in South Africa, Namibia, Kenya, Nigeria, the Democratic Republic of Congo, Egypt, Sudan and the United Arab Emirates.

The larvae feed on Acacia nilotica and Acacia arabica.
