= Ancylosis nubeculella =

Scientific classification
- Domain: Eukaryota
- Kingdom: Animalia
- Phylum: Arthropoda
- Class: Insecta
- Order: Lepidoptera
- Family: Pyralidae
- Genus: Ancylosis
- Species: A. nubeculella

Binomial name
- Ancylosis nubeculella (Ragonot, 1887)

Synonyms
- Heterographis nubeculella Ragonot, 1887

Species of moth

Ancylosis nubeculella is a species of snout moth in the genus Ancylosis. It was described by Ragonot in 1887. It is found in Sudan, Saudi Arabia, Turkey, the southern Caucasus, Iran, Pakistan, Afghanistan, Egypt and the Canary Islands.
