= Scopula adelpharia =

Scientific classification
- Domain: Eukaryota
- Kingdom: Animalia
- Phylum: Arthropoda
- Class: Insecta
- Order: Lepidoptera
- Family: Geometridae
- Genus: Scopula
- Species: S. adelpharia

Binomial name
- Scopula adelpharia (Püngeler, 1894)

Synonyms
- Acidalia adelpharia Püngeler 1894

Species of geometer moths in subfamily Sterrhinae

Scopula adelpharia is a moth of the family Geometridae. It was described by Püngeler in 1894. It is found in North Africa, the Near East and Middle East.

The larvae feed on Convolvulus and Prosopis species.

== Subspecies ==
- Scopula adelpharia adelpharia (Israel, Palestine)
- Scopula adelpharia pharaonis Sterneck, 1933 (Egypt)
