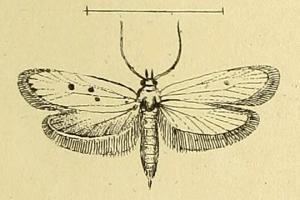

Scientific classification
- Domain: Eukaryota
- Kingdom: Animalia
- Phylum: Arthropoda
- Class: Insecta
- Order: Lepidoptera
- Family: Depressariidae
- Genus: Ethmia
- Species: E. quadrinotella

Binomial name
- Ethmia quadrinotella (Mann, 1861)

Synonyms
- Anesychia quadrinotella Mann, 1861; Ethmia quadrinotella var. atticella Caradja, 1920; Eulechria galaxaea Myerick, 1922; Psecadia quiquenotella Chrétien, 1915; Psecadia acutella Turati, 1934; Ethmia paneliusella Viette, 1958

= Ethmia quadrinotella =

Species of moth

Ethmia quadrinotella is a moth in the family Depressariidae. It is found in Greece, Turkey, Armenia, Syria, the Palestinian Territories, Iran, Iraq, Afghanistan, north-western Karakoram, Bahrain, Arabia, Tunisia, Algeria, Egypt, Morocco, Cape Verde and northern Sudan.

The larvae have been recorded feeding on Heliotropium undulatum.

== Subspecies ==
- Ethmia quadrinotella quadrinotella (Greece, Turkey, Armenia, Syria, Palestinian Territories, Iran)
- Ethmia quadrinotella quiquenotella Chrétien, 1915 (Cape Verde, Morocco, Algeria, Egypt, northern Sudan, Arabia, Bahrain, south-western Iraq, southern Iran, Afghanistan, north-western Karakoram, Tunisia)
