= Ancylosis lacteicostella =

Scientific classification
- Domain: Eukaryota
- Kingdom: Animalia
- Phylum: Arthropoda
- Class: Insecta
- Order: Lepidoptera
- Family: Pyralidae
- Genus: Ancylosis
- Species: A. lacteicostella

Binomial name
- Ancylosis lacteicostella (Ragonot, 1887)

Synonyms
- Heterographis lacteicostella Ragonot, 1887

Species of moth

Ancylosis lacteicostella is a species of snout moth in the genus Ancylosis. It was described by Ragonot in 1887 from Uzbekistan, but is also found in Russia.

The wingspan is about 18 mm.
