= Coleophora sudanella =

Scientific classification
- Kingdom: Animalia
- Phylum: Arthropoda
- Class: Insecta
- Order: Lepidoptera
- Family: Coleophoridae
- Genus: Coleophora
- Species: C. sudanella

Binomial name
- Coleophora sudanella Rebel, 1916

Species of moth

Coleophora sudanella is a moth of the family Coleophoridae. It is found in Sudan, Saudi Arabia, Yemen and the United Arab Emirates.
