= Stigmella xystodes =

Scientific classification
- Kingdom: Animalia
- Phylum: Arthropoda
- Class: Insecta
- Order: Lepidoptera
- Family: Nepticulidae
- Genus: Stigmella
- Species: S. xystodes

Binomial name
- Stigmella xystodes (Meyrick, 1916)

Synonyms
- Nepticula xystodes Meyrick, 1916; Nepticula liochalca Meyrick, 1916; Stigmella liochalca (Meyrick, 1916); Nepticula homophaea Meyrick, 1918; Stigmella homophaea (Meyrick, 1918)

Species of moth

Stigmella xystodes is a moth of the family Nepticulidae first described by Edward Meyrick in 1916. It is found from the Oriental region to the Near East, North Africa and the Canary Islands.

The wingspan is 4.9–6.6 mm for males and 5–5.5 mm for females. Adults are on wing from July to August in the orient.

The larvae feed on Cyperus rotundus and probably Cyperus conglomeratus. They mine the leaves of their host plant.

== Original description ==
(S . 4-5 mm) Head ochreous-yellow, collar whitish. Antennae and eyecaps whitish. Thorax and abdomen light grey. Forewings lanceolate, light rather glossy grey; cilia whitish, tinged with grey on basal half, hindwings pale grey; cilia grey-whitish. Bengal, Pusa, in July and August (Fletcher); two specimens.

— Original description by Edward Meyrick
