= Surattha soudanensis =

Scientific classification
- Kingdom: Animalia
- Phylum: Arthropoda
- Class: Insecta
- Order: Lepidoptera
- Family: Crambidae
- Subfamily: Crambinae
- Tribe: Ancylolomiini
- Genus: Surattha
- Species: S. soudanensis

Binomial name
- Surattha soudanensis (Hampson, 1919)

Synonyms
- Prionapteryx soudanensis

Species of moth

Surattha soudanensis is a moth in the family Crambidae. It is found in Bahrain, Saudi Arabia, Sudan, the United Arab Emirates, Afghanistan and Iran.
