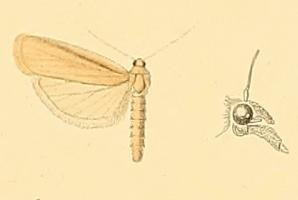

Scientific classification
- Kingdom: Animalia
- Phylum: Arthropoda
- Class: Insecta
- Order: Lepidoptera
- Family: Pyralidae
- Genus: Aphomia
- Species: A. sabella

Binomial name
- Aphomia sabella Hampson in Ragonot, 1901

Synonyms
- Arenipses sabella Hampson in Ragonot, 1901

= Aphomia sabella =

Species of moth

Aphomia sabella, the greater date moth, is a species of snout moth in the genus Aphomia. It was described by George Hampson in 1901 and is known from the Persian Gulf, Algeria and Iran. It was first recorded in Spain in 1999.

The wingspan is about 34 mm for males and 40 mm for females.

The larvae have been recorded feeding on Phoenix dactylifera.
