= Aglossa aglossalis =

Scientific classification
- Kingdom: Animalia
- Phylum: Arthropoda
- Clade: Pancrustacea
- Class: Insecta
- Order: Lepidoptera
- Family: Pyralidae
- Genus: Aglossa
- Species: A. aglossalis

Binomial name
- Aglossa aglossalis (Ragonot, 1892)

Synonyms
- Crocalia aglossalis Ragonot, 1892; Aglossa exsculpta Meyrick, 1937; Agriope exigualis Chrétien, 1911; Agriope latidorsalis Turati, 1929; Crocalia africana Rothschild, 1921

Species of moth

Aglossa aglossalis is a species of snout moth in the genus Aglossa. It was described by Ragonot, in 1892, and is known from Algeria, Tunisia, Libya, Iraq, Iran, India, Pakistan, Sudan and the United Arab Emirates.
