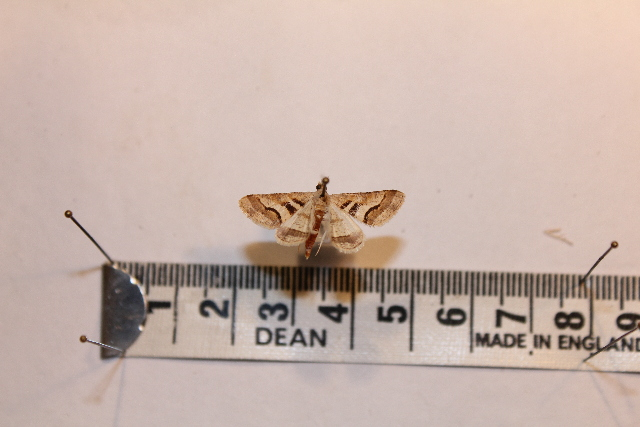

Scientific classification
- Kingdom: Animalia
- Phylum: Arthropoda
- Class: Insecta
- Order: Lepidoptera
- Family: Geometridae
- Genus: Isturgia
- Species: I. disputaria

Binomial name
- Isturgia disputaria (Guenée, [1858])

Synonyms
- Eubolia disputaria Guenée, [1858]

= Isturgia disputaria =

Maltese bloom

Species of moth

Isturgia disputaria, the Maltese bloom, is a moth of the family Geometridae. It was described by Achille Guenée in 1858. It is found on the Canary Islands and Malta and in the Afrotropical realm, Asian Turkey, the Caucasus, Georgia, Armenia, Azerbaijan, Lebanon, Syria, Israel, Jordan, Egypt, the Arabian Peninsula, Iran and Iraq.

The wingspan is 21–29 mm (0.8–1.1 in). Adults have been recorded on wing from April to May.

The larvae feed on Acacia species, including Acacia nilotica.
