= List of moths of Saudi Arabia =

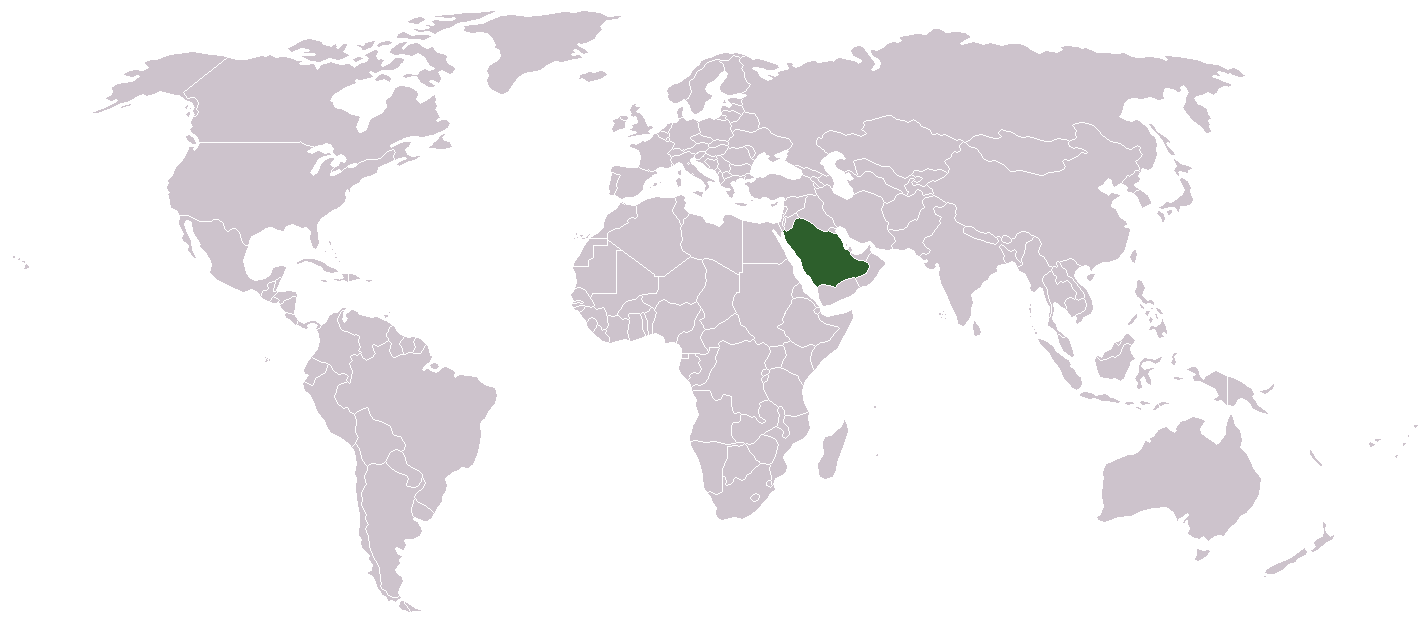
Location of Saudi Arabia

There are about 420 known moth species of Saudi Arabia. The moths (mostly nocturnal) and butterflies (mostly diurnal) together make up the taxonomic order Lepidoptera.

This is a list of moth species which have been recorded in Saudi Arabia.

== Arctiidae ==
- Apisa arabica Warnecke, 1934
- Apisa canescens Walker, 1855
- Creatonotos leucanioides Holland, 1893
- Lepista arabica (Rebel, 1907)
- Nyctemera torbeni Wiltshire, 1983
- Siccia arabica Wiltshire, 1983
- Siccia buettikeri Wiltshire, 1988
- Spilosoma feifensis Wiltshire, 1986
- Thyretes buettikeri Wiltshire, 1983
- Utetheisa amhara Jordan, 1939
- Utetheisa lotrix (Cramer, 1779)
- Utetheisa pulchella (Linnaeus, 1758)

== Autostichidae ==
- Heringita amselina (Gozmány, 1967)
- Hesperesta arabica Gozmány, 2000
- Turatia arenacella Gozmány, 2000
- Turatia striatula Gozmány, 2000

== Brachodidae ==
- Nigilgia talhouki Diakonoff, 1983
- Phycodes chalcocrossa (Meyrick, 1909)

== Carposinidae ==
- Metacosmesis xerostola Diakonoff, 1983

== Choreutidae ==
- Choreutis aegyptiaca (Zeller, 1867)
- Tebenna micalis (Mann, 1857)

== Coleophoridae ==
- Coleophora ammodyta Falkovitsh, 1970
- Coleophora aularia Meyrick, 1924
- Coleophora cyrniella Rebel, 1926
- Coleophora emberizella Baldizzone, 1985
- Coleophora hospitiella Chrétien, 1915
- Coleophora jebeli Baldizzone, 1985
- Coleophora jerusalemella Toll, 1942
- Coleophora lasloella Baldizzone, 1982
- Coleophora nurmahal Toll, 1957
- Coleophora praecipua Walsingham, 1907
- Coleophora sarehma Toll, 1956
- Coleophora saudita Baldizzone, 1985
- Coleophora shadeganensis Toll, 1959
- Coleophora sudanella Rebel, 1916
- Coleophora viettella Toll, 1956

== Cosmopterigidae ==
- Alloclita cerritella (Riedl, 1993)
- Alloclita delozona Meyrick, 1919
- Bifascioides leucomelanella (Rebel, 1917)
- Pseudascalenia riadella Kasy, 1968

== Cossidae ==
- Aethalopteryx wiltshirei Yakovlev, 2009
- Azygophleps sheikh Yakovlev & Saldaitis, 2011
- Meharia acuta Wiltshire, 1982
- Meharia philbyi Bradley, 1952
- Meharia semilactea (Warren & Rothschild, 1905)
- Mormogystia proleuca (Hampson in Walsingham & Hampson, 1896)

== Crambidae ==
- Achyra nudalis (Hübner, 1796)
- Ancylolomia micropalpella Amsel, 1951
- Antigastra catalaunalis (Duponchel, 1833)
- Cnaphalocrocis trapezalis (Guenée, 1854)
- Crocidolomia pavonana (Fabricius, 1794)
- Diaphana indica (Saunders, 1851)
- Duponchelia fovealis Zeller, 1847
- Euchromius cambridgei (Zeller, 1867)
- Evergestis desertalis (Hübner, 1813)
- Heliothela ophideresana (Walker, 1863)
- Hellula undalis (Fabricius, 1781)
- Herpetogramma licarsisalis (Walker, 1859)
- Hodebertia testalis (Fabricius, 1794)
- Leucinodes orbonalis Guenée, 1854
- Nomophila noctuella ([Denis & Schiffermüller], 1775)
- Omiodes indicata (Fabricius, 1775)
- Palepicorsia ustrinalis (Christoph, 1877)
- Pediasia numidellus (Rebel, 1903)
- Prionapteryx soudanensis (Hampson, 1919)
- Prionapteryx strioliger Rothschild, 1913
- Ptychopseustis ictericalis (Swinhoe, 1885)
- Pyrausta arabica Butler, 1884
- Pyrausta phaenicealis (Hübner, 1818)
- Spoladea recurvalis (Fabricius, 1775)
- Synclera traducalis (Zeller, 1852)
- Udea ferrugalis (Hübner, 1796)
- Uresiphita polygonalis ([Denis & Schiffermüller], 1775)

== Elachistidae ==
- Ethmia quadrinotella (Mann, 1861)

== Gelechiidae ==
- Athrips irritans (Povolny, 1989)
- Athrips sisterina (Povolny, 1989)
- Ochrodia subdiminutella (Stainton, 1867)
- Parapsectris amseli (Povolny, 1981)
- Parapsectris buettikeri (Povolny, 1986)
- Parapsectris similis (Povolny, 1981)
- Scrobipalpa ergasima (Meyrick, 1916)
- Scrobipalpa vicaria (Meyrick, 1921)

== Geometridae ==
- Brachyglossina sonyae Wiltshire, 1990
- Charissa lequatrei (Herbulot, 1988)
- Chiasmia subcurvaria (Mabille, 1897)
- Cleora pavlitzkiae (D. S. Fletcher, 1958)
- Hemidromodes sabulifera Prout, 1922
- Idaea eremica (Brandt, 1941)
- Idaea granulosa (Warren & Rothschild, 1905)
- Idaea hathor (Wiltshire, 1949)
- Idaea hesuata Wiltshire, 1983
- Idaea illustris (Brandt, 1941)
- Idaea mimetes (Brandt, 1941)
- Idaea sanctaria Staudinger, 1900
- Idaea sordida (Rothschild, 1913)
- Idaea tahamae Wiltshire, 1983
- Isturgia catalaunaria (Guenée, 1858)
- Isturgia disputaria (Guenée, 1858)
- Isturgia sublimbata (Butler, 1885)
- Microloxia ruficornis Warren, 1897
- Neromia pulvereisparsa (Hampson, 1896)
- Palaeaspilates sublutearia (Wiltshire, 1977)
- Phaiogramma discessa (Walker, 1861)
- Platypepla arabella Wiltshire, 1983
- Pseudosterrha rufistrigata (Hampson, 1896)
- Psilocerea arabica Wiltshire, 1983
- Scopula actuaria (Walker, 1861)
- Scopula adelpharia (Püngeler, 1894)
- Xanthorhoe wiltshirei (Brandt, 1941)
- Zamarada latilimbata Rebel, 1948
- Zamarada minimaria Swinhoe, 1895
- Zamarada torrida D. S. Fletcher, 1974

== Gracillariidae ==
- Phyllocnistis citrella Stainton, 1856
- Stomphastis conflua (Meyrick, 1914)

== Lasiocampidae ==
- Braura sultani (Wiltshire, 1986)
- Streblote acaciae (Klug, 1829)

== Lymantriidae ==
- Albarracina baui Standfuss, ????
- Casama vilis (Walker, 1865)
- Euproctis cervina Moore, ????

== Metarbelidae ==
- Metarbela taifensis Wiltshire, 1988

== Micronoctuidae ==
- Micronola wadicola Amsel, 1935

== Nepticulidae ==
- Stigmella birgittae Gustafsson, 1985

== Noctuidae ==
- Acantholipes aurea Berio, 1966
- Acantholipes circumdata (Walker, 1858)
- Achaea catella Guenée, 1852
- Achaea faber Holland, 1894
- Achaea finita (Guenée, 1852)
- Achaea mercatoria (Fabricius, 1775)
- Achaea trapezoides (Guenée, 1862)
- Acontia albarabica Wiltshire, 1994
- Acontia asbenensis (Rothschild, 1921)
- Acontia basifera Walker, 1857
- Acontia binominata (Butler, 1892)
- Acontia crassivalva (Wiltshire, 1947)
- Acontia dichroa (Hampson, 1914)
- Acontia hortensis Swinhoe, 1884
- Acontia imitatrix Wallengren, 1856
- Acontia insocia (Walker, 1857)
- Acontia lactea Hacker, Legrain & Fibiger, 2008
- Acontia leucotrigona (Hampson, 1905)
- Acontia notabilis (Walker, 1857)
- Acontia nubila Hampson, 1910
- Acontia philbyi Wiltshire, 1988
- Acontia semialba Hampson, 1910
- Acontia trabealis (Scopoli, 1973)
- Acontia transfigurata Wallengren, 1856
- Acontia trimaculata Aurivillius, 1879
- Acontia yemenensis (Hampson, 1918)
- Adisura bella Gaede, 1915
- Aegle exsiccata (Warren & Rothschild, 1905)
- Aegocera rectilinea Boisduval, 1836
- Agrotis biconica Kollar, 1844
- Agrotis herzogi Rebel, 1911
- Agrotis ipsilon (Hufnagel, 1766)
- Agrotis pictifascia (Hampson, 1896)
- Agrotis sardzeana Brandt, 1941
- Agrotis segetum ([Denis & Schiffermüller], 1775)
- Agrotis trux (Hübner, 1824)
- Amyna axis Guenée, 1852
- Amyna delicata Wiltshire, 1994
- Amyna punctum (Fabricius, 1794)
- Anarta trifolii (Hufnagel, 1766)
- Anomis flava (Fabricius, 1775)
- Anomis leona (Schaus & Clements, 1893)
- Antarchaea conicephala (Staudinger, 1870)
- Antarchaea digramma (Walker, 1863)
- Antarchaea erubescens (Bang-Haas, 1910)
- Antarchaea fragilis (Butler, 1875)
- Anticarsia rubricans (Boisduval, 1833)
- Anumeta spilota (Erschoff, 1874)
- Asota speciosa (Drury, 1773)
- Asplenia melanodonta (Hampson, 1896)
- Athetis gizana Wiltshire, 1986
- Athetis pigra (Guenée, 1852)
- Attatha metaleuca Hampson, 1913
- Aucha polyphaenoides (Wiltshire, 1961)
- Autoba abrupta (Walker, 1865)
- Beihania cuculiella Wiltshire, 1967
- Brevipecten biscornuta Wiltshire, 1985
- Brithysana africana Laporte, 1973
- Calesia xanthognatha Hampson, 1926
- Callopistria latreillei (Duponchel, 1827)
- Callyna figurans Walker, 1858
- Caradrina anomoeosis (Hampson, 1902)
- Caradrina clavipalpis (Scopoli, 1763)
- Caradrina elongata (Plante, 1997)
- Caradrina pseudocosma (Plante, 1997)
- Caradrina soudanensis (Hampson, 1918)
- Caranilla uvarovi (Wiltshire, 1949)
- Carcharoda yemenicola Wiltshire, 1983
- Chrysodeixis chalcites (Esper, 1789)
- Clytie devia (Swinhoe, 1884)
- Clytie euryphaea Hampson, 1918
- Clytie infrequens (Swinhoe, 1884)
- Clytie tropicalis Rungs, 1975
- Colobochyla platyzona Lederer,
- Condica capensis (Guenée, 1852)
- Condica conducta (Walker, 1857)
- Condica illecta Walker, 1865
- Condica viscosa (Freyer, 1831)
- Cryphia paulina (Staudinger, 1891)
- Ctenoplusia accentifera (Lefèbvre, 1827)
- Ctenoplusia fracta (Walker, 1857)
- Ctenoplusia furcifera (Walker, 1857)
- Ctenoplusia limbirena (Guenée, 1852)
- Diadochia stigmatica Wiltshire, 1985
- Drasteria kabylaria (Bang-Haas, 1906)
- Dysgonia angularis (Boisduval, 1833)
- Dysgonia torrida (Guenée, 1852)
- Dysmilichia pica Wiltshire, 1983
- Ericeia congregata (Walker, 1858)
- Eublemma apicipunctalis (Brandt, 1939)
- Eublemma baccalix (Swinhoe, 1886)
- Eublemma bifasciata (Moore, 1881)
- Eublemma cochylioides (Guenée, 1852)
- Eublemma deserti (Rothschild, 1909)
- Eublemma ecthaemata Hampson, 1896
- Eublemma gayneri (Rothschild, 1901)
- Eublemma khonoides Wiltshire, 1980
- Eublemma pallidula (Herrich-Schäffer, 1851)
- Eublemma parva (Hübner, [1808])
- Eublemma ragusana (Freyer, 1844)
- Eublemma robertsi Berio, 1969
- Eublemma scitula (Rambur, 1833)
- Eublemma seminivea Hampson, 1896
- Eublemma siticuosa (Lederer, 1858)
- Eublemma stygiochroa Hampson, 1910
- Eublemma thermobasis Hampson, 1910
- Eublemma tomentalis Rebel, 1948
- Eulocastra alfierii Wiltshire, 1948
- Eutelia mima Prout, 1925
- Feliniopsis consummata (Walker, 1857)
- Feliniopsis hosplitoides (Laporte, 1979)
- Feliniopsis talhouki (Wiltshire, 1983)
- Gnamptonyx innexa (Walker, 1858)
- Grammodes stolida (Fabricius, 1775)
- Hadena laudeti (Boisduval, ????)
- Hadjina tyriobaphes Wiltshire, 1983
- Haplocestra similis Aurivillius, 1910
- Helicoverpa armigera (Hübner, [1808])
- Heliocheilus confertissima (Walker, 1865)
- Heliothis nubigera Herrich-Schäffer, 1851
- Heliothis peltigera ([Denis & Schiffermüller], 1775)
- Heterographa pungeleri Bartel, 1904
- Heteropalpia acrosticta (Püngeler, 1904)
- Heteropalpia cortytoides Berio, 1939
- Heteropalpia exarata (Mabille, 1890)
- Heteropalpia profesta (Christoph, 1887)
- Heteropalpia robusta Wiltshire, 1988
- Heteropalpia rosacea (Rebel, 1907)
- Hipoepa fractalis (Guenée, 1854)
- Hypena abyssinialis Guenée, 1854
- Hypena laceratalis Walker, 1859
- Hypena lividalis (Hübner, 1790)
- Hypena obacerralis Walker, [1859]
- Hypena obsitalis (Hübner, [1813])
- Hypena varialis Walker, 1866
- Hypotacha boursini Warnecke, 1937
- Hypotacha ochribasalis (Hampson, 1896)
- Hypotacha raffaldii Berio, 1939
- Iambiodes postpallida Wiltshire, 1977
- Lacera alope (Cramer, 1780)
- Leucania loreyi (Duponchel, 1827)
- Leucania sicula Treitschke, 1835
- Lithacodia blandula (Guenée, 1862)
- Masalia albiseriata (Druce, 1903)
- Masalia perstriata (Hampson, 1903)
- Maxera nigriceps (Walker, 1858)
- Mesoligia algaini Wiltshire, 1983
- Metachrostis quinaria (Moore, 1881)
- Metagarista subcrocea Wiltshire, 1983
- Metopoceras kneuckeri (Rebel, 1903)
- Mimasura dhofarica Wiltshire, 1985
- Mocis frugalis (Fabricius, 1775)
- Mocis mayeri (Boisduval, 1833)
- Mocis proverai Zilli, 2000
- Mythimna languida (Walker, 1858)
- Mythimna umbrigera (Saalmüller, 1891)
- Nimasia brachyura Wiltshire, 1982
- Ophiusa dianaris (Guenée, 1852)
- Ophiusa tirhaca (Cramer, 1777)
- Oraesia intrusa (Krüger, 1939)
- Ozarba algaini Wiltshire, 1983
- Ozarba atrifera Hampson, 1910
- Ozarba debrosi Wiltshire, 1983
- Ozarba mesozonata Hampson, 1916
- Ozarba nyanza (Felder & Rogenhofer, 1874)
- Ozarba semitorrida Hampson, 1916
- Ozarba socotrana Hampson, 1910
- Ozarba timida Berio, 1940
- Pandesma robusta (Walker, 1858)
- Pericyma mendax (Walker, 1858)
- Pericyma metaleuca Hampson, 1913
- Peridroma saucia (Hübner, [1808])
- Phytometra hesuensis (Wiltshire, 1983)
- Plusiopalpa dichora Holland, 1894
- Polydesma umbricola Boisduval, 1833
- Polymixis juditha (Staudinger, 1897)
- Polytela cliens (Felder & Rogenhofer, 1874)
- Prionofrontia ochrosia Hampson, 1926
- Pseudopseustis beduina (Wiltshire, 1948)
- Pseudozarba mesozona (Hampson, 1896)
- Pseudozarba orthozona Wiltshire, 1985
- Rhynchina albiscripta Hampson, 1916
- Rhynchina revolutalis (Zeller, 1852)
- Rhynchodontodes antistropha (Vári, 1962)
- Scythocentropus inquinata (Mabille, 1888)
- Sesamia nonagrioides (Lefèbvre, 1827)
- Simplicia extinctalis (Zeller, 1852)
- Simyra confusa (Walker, 1856)
- Sphingomorpha chlorea (Cramer, 1777)
- Spodoptera cilium Guenée, 1852
- Spodoptera exempta (Walker, 1857)
- Spodoptera exigua (Hübner, 1808)
- Spodoptera littoralis (Boisduval, 1833)
- Spodoptera mauritia (Boisduval, 1833)
- Syngrapha circumflexa (Linnaeus, 1767)
- Talhoukia feifae Wiltshire, 1986
- Tathorhynchus exsiccata (Lederer, 1855)
- Thiacidas adnanensis (Wiltshire, 1980)
- Thiacidas cerurodes (Hampson, 1916)
- Thiacidas postica Walker, 1855
- Thiacidas roseotincta (Pinhey, 1962)
- Thysanoplusia daubei (Boisduval, 1840)
- Thysanoplusia sestertia (Felder & Rogenhofer, 1874)
- Trichoplusia ni (Hübner, [1803])
- Trichoplusia orichalcea (Fabricius, 1775)
- Trigonodes exportata Guenée, 1852
- Tytroca leucoptera (Hampson, 1896)
- Ulotrichopus tinctipennis (Hampson, 1902)
- Vittaplusia vittata (Wallengren, 1856)

== Nolidae ==
- Archinola pyralidia Hampson, 1896
- Arcyophora longivalvis Guenée, 1852
- Arcyophora patricula (Hampson, 1902)
- Earias biplaga Walker, 1866
- Earias cupreoviridis (Walker, 1862)
- Earias insulana (Boisduval, 1833)
- Giaura dakkaki Wiltshire, 1986
- Lophocrama phoenicochlora Hampson, 1912
- Maurilia arcuata (Walker, [1858])
- Neaxestis montivalva Wiltshire, 1986
- Odontestis murina Wiltshire, 1988
- Pardasena virgulana (Mabille, 1880)
- Pardoxia graellsii (Feisthamel, 1837)
- Xanthodes albago (Fabricius, 1794)

== Oecophoridae ==
- Amseloecia arabica Povolny, 1983
- Stathmopoda diplaspis (Meyrick, 1887)

== Psychidae ==
- Psyche luteipalpis Walker, 1870

== Pterophoridae ==
- Agdistis arabica Amsel, 1958
- Agdistis bellissima Arenberger, 1975
- Agdistis frankeniae (Zeller, 1847)
- Agdistis hakimah Arenberger, 1985
- Agdistis nanodes Meyrick, 1906
- Agdistis obstinata Meyrick, 1920
- Agdistis olei Arenberger, 1976
- Agdistis parvella Amsel, 1958
- Agdistis tamaricis (Zeller, 1847)
- Arcoptilia gizan Arenberger, 1985
- Diacrotricha lanceatus (Arenberger, 1986)
- Emmelina monodactyla (Linnaeus, 1758)
- Megalorhipida leucodactylus (Fabricius, 1794)
- Porrittia imbecilla (Meyrick, 1925)
- Stenodacma wahlbergi (Zeller, 1852)
- Stenoptilia amseli Arenberger, 1990
- Stenoptilodes taprobanes (Felder & Rogenhofer, 1875)

== Pyralidae ==
- Anagasta kuehniella (Zeller, 1879)
- Ancylosis faustinella (Zeller, 1867)
- Ancylosis lacteicostella (Ragonot, 1887)
- Ancylosis limoniella (Chrétien, 1911)
- Ancylosis nigritarsea Hampson, 1896
- Ancylosis nubeculella (Ragonot, 1887)
- Ancylosis obscuripunctella Roesler, 1973
- Arenipses sabella Hampson, 1901
- Bazaria pempeliella Ragonot, 1893
- Cadra calidella (Guenée, 1845)
- Emmalocera strigicostella (Hampson, 1896)
- Hypotia rufimarginalis (Hampson, 1896)
- Hypotia vulgaris (Butler, 1881)
- Raphimetopus ablutella (Zeller, 1839)
- Staudingeria partitella Ragonot, 1887
- Staudingeria yerburii (Butler, 1884)
- Thylacoptila paurosema Meyrick, 1885

== Sphingidae ==
- Euchloron megaera (Linnaeus, 1758)
- Hippotion celerio (Linnaeus, 1758)
- Hippotion moorei Jordan, 1926
- Hippotion pentagramma (Hampson, 1910)
- Macroglossum trochilus (Hübner, 1823)
- Pseudoclanis molitor (Rothschild & Jordan, 1912)

== Tineidae ==
- Perissomastix nigriceps Warren & Rothschild, 1905
- Trichophaga abruptella (Wollaston, 1858)
- Trichophaga swinhoei (Butler, 1884)

== Tortricidae ==
- Aphelia deserticolor Diakonoff, 1983
- Bactra bactrana (Kennel, 1901)
- Bactra minima Meyrick, 1909
- Bactra simpliciana Chrétien, 1915
- Bactra venosana (Zeller, 1847)
- Cirriphora pharaonana (Kollar, 1858)
- Cochylimorpha lagara (Diakonoff, 1983)
- Crocidosema plebejana Zeller, 1847
- Cryptophlebia melanopoda Diakonoff, 1983
- Cryptophlebia peltastica (Meyrick, 1921)
- Cydia alabastrina Diakonoff, 1983
- Cydia dissulta Diakonoff, 1983
- Cydia melanoptycha Diakonoff, 1983
- Cydia odontica Diakonoff, 1983
- Cydia periclydonia Diakonoff, 1983
- Dasodis cladographa Diakonoff, 1983
- Eccopsis wahlbergiana Zeller, 1852
- Endothenia oblongana (Haworth, 1811)
- Fulcrifera leucophaea Diakonoff, 1983
- Fulcrifera refrigescens (Meyrick, 1924)
- Grapholita steringus Diakonoff, 1983
- Gypsonoma riparia Meyrick, 1933
- Lobesia vectis Diakonoff, 1983
- Namasia catoptrica Diakonoff, 1983
- Pammene megalocephala Diakonoff, 1983
- Procrica ammina Diakonoff, 1983
- Protancylis amseli Diakonoff, 1983
- Selania resedana (Obraztsov, 1959)
- Strepsicrates cryptosema Diakonoff, 1983
- Trachysmia jerichoana (Amsel, 1935)

== Xyloryctidae ==
- Eretmocera fasciata Walsingham, 1896
- Scythris kebirella Amsel, 1935
