= Parapsectris =

Scientific classification
- Domain: Eukaryota
- Kingdom: Animalia
- Phylum: Arthropoda
- Class: Insecta
- Order: Lepidoptera
- Family: Gelechiidae
- Tribe: Gelechiini
- Genus: Parapsectris; Meyrick, 1911

Genus of moths

Parapsectris is a genus of moths in the family Gelechiidae.

== Species ==
- Parapsectris alfonsi Bidzilya, 2010
- Parapsectris carinata (Meyrick, 1911)
- Parapsectris curvisaccula Bidzilya, 2010
- Parapsectris exstincta (Meyrick, 1911)
- Parapsectris fastidiosa Meyrick, 1911
- Parapsectris ferax (Meyrick, 1913)
- Parapsectris feraxoides Bidzilya, 2010
- Parapsectris ferulata Meyrick, 1918
- Parapsectris griseoflavida Bidzilya, 2010
- Parapsectris konradi Bidzilya, 2010
- Parapsectris lacunosa (Meyrick, 1918)
- Parapsectris modica Bidzilya, 2010
- Parapsectris nigrifasciata Bidzilya, 2010
- Parapsectris ochrocosma (Meyrick, 1911)
- Parapsectris ochrostigma Bidzilya, 2010
- Parapsectris opaula (Meyrick, 1911)
- Parapsectris savannae Bidzilya, 2010
- Parapsectris tholaea Meyrick, 1911
- Parapsectris violae Bidzilya, 2010

== Sometimes included here ==
- Parapsectris amseli (Povolný, 1981)
- Parapsectris buettikeri (Povolný, 1986)
- Parapsectris similis (Povolny, 1981)
