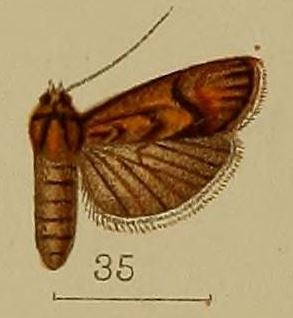
- Ancylodes argentescens

Scientific classification
- Domain: Eukaryota
- Kingdom: Animalia
- Phylum: Arthropoda
- Class: Insecta
- Order: Lepidoptera
- Family: Pyralidae
- Subfamily: Phycitinae
- Tribe: Phycitini
- Genus: Ancylodes; Ragonot, 1887

Type species
- Ancylodes pallens Ragonot, 1887

= Ancylodes =

Genus of moths

Ancylodes is a genus of snout moths. It was described by Émile Louis Ragonot in 1887, and is known from Spain, Libya, Iraq, Sri Lanka, as well as Australia.

== Species ==
- Ancylodes argentescens (Hampson, 1912)
- Ancylodes bonhoti Hampson, 1901
- Ancylodes dealbatella (Erschoff, 1874)
- Ancylodes lapsalis (Walker, 1859)
- Ancylodes pallens Ragonot, 1887
- Ancylodes penicillata Turner, 1905
