= Procrica =

Scientific classification
- Domain: Eukaryota
- Kingdom: Animalia
- Phylum: Arthropoda
- Class: Insecta
- Order: Lepidoptera
- Family: Tortricidae
- Tribe: Archipini
- Genus: Procrica; Diakonoff, 1960

Genus of tortrix moths

Procrica is a genus of moths belonging to the subfamily Tortricinae of the family Tortricidae. The genus was erected by Alexey Diakonoff in 1960.

== Species ==
- Procrica agrapha Diakonoff, 1983
- Procrica camerunica Razowski, 2002
- Procrica diarda Diakonoff, 1983
- Procrica dinshona Razowski & Trematerra, 2010
- Procrica imitans (Diakonoff, 1947)
- Procrica intrepida (Meyrick, 1912)
- Procrica mariepskopa Razowski, 2008
- Procrica ochrata Razowski, 2002
- Procrica ophiograpta (Meyrick, 1932)
- Procrica parisii Razowski & Trematerra, 2010
- Procrica parva Razowski, 2002
- Procrica pilgrima Razowski, 2008
- Procrica sanidota (Meyrick, 1912)
- Procrica semilutea Diakonoff, 1960

== Former species ==
- Procrica ammina Diakonoff, 1983

== See also ==
- List of Tortricidae genera
