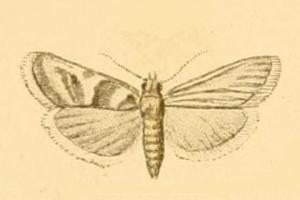
- Bazaria sieversi

Scientific classification
- Domain: Eukaryota
- Kingdom: Animalia
- Phylum: Arthropoda
- Class: Insecta
- Order: Lepidoptera
- Family: Pyralidae
- Subfamily: Phycitinae
- Tribe: Phycitini
- Genus: Bazaria; Ragonot, 1887

Synonyms
- Anoristia Ragonot, 1887; Culcita Amsel, 1959; Culcitaria Amsel, 1970; Vixsinusia Amsel, 1970

= Bazaria =

Genus of moths

Bazaria is a genus of snout moths. It was described by Émile Louis Ragonot in 1887 and is known from China, Turkmenistan, and Spain.

== Species ==
- Bazaria djiroftella Amsel, 1959
- Bazaria dulanensis Y.L. Du & L. Yan, 2009
- Bazaria expallidella Ragonot, 1887
- Bazaria fulvofasciata Rothschild, 1915
- Bazaria gilvella (Ragonot, 1887)
- Bazaria lixiviella (Erschoff, 1874)
- Bazaria nomiella (Ragonot, 1887)
- Bazaria pempeliella Ragonot, 1893
- Bazaria polichomriella Amsel, 1970
- Bazaria ruscinonella Ragonot, 1888
- Bazaria sieversi (Christoph, 1877)
- Bazaria turensis Ragonot, 1887
- Bazaria umbrifasciella (Ragonot, 1887)
- Bazaria venosella Asselbergs, 2009
