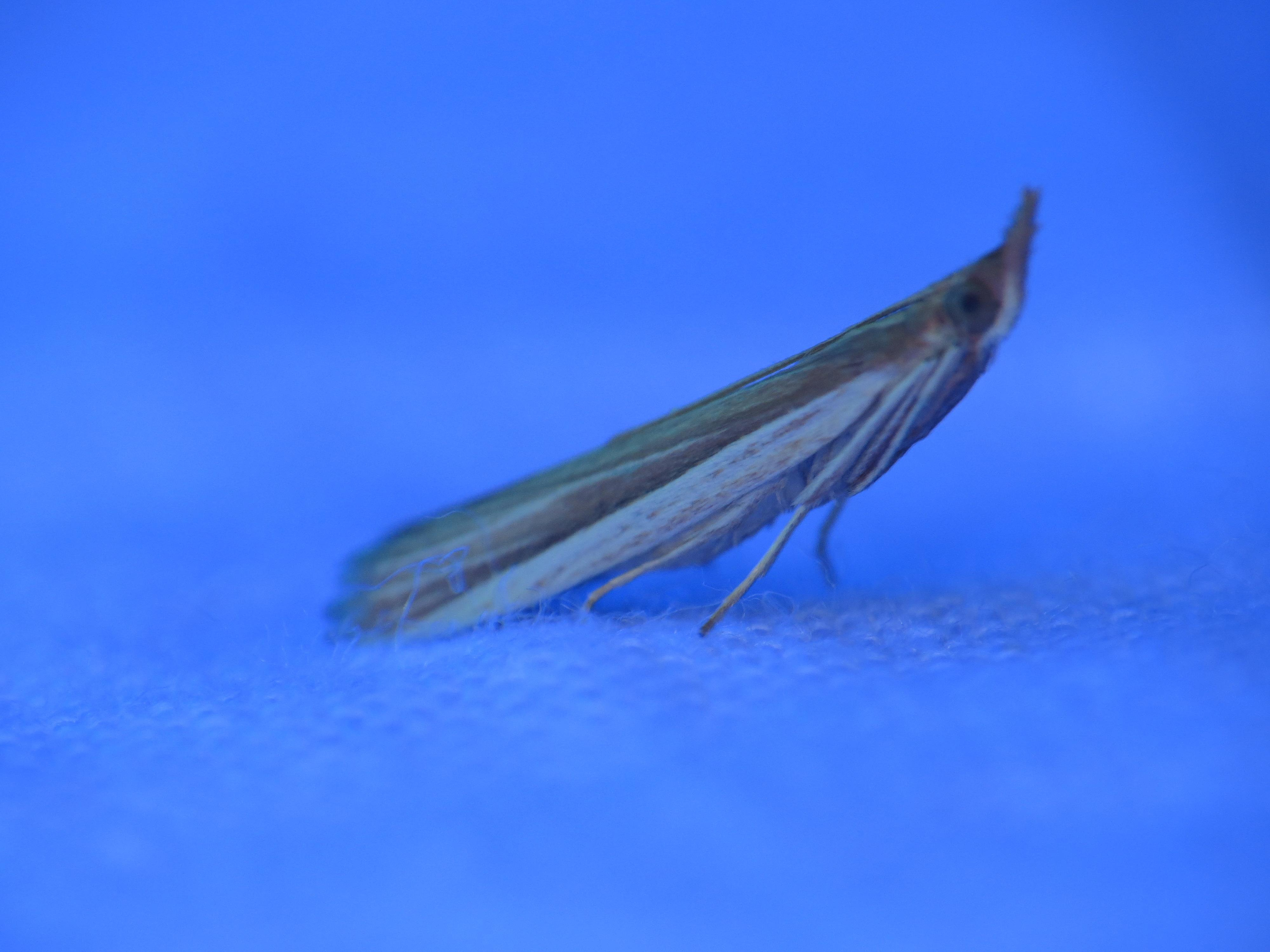

Scientific classification
- Domain: Eukaryota
- Kingdom: Animalia
- Phylum: Arthropoda
- Class: Insecta
- Order: Lepidoptera
- Family: Pyralidae
- Genus: Emmalocera
- Species: E. latilimbella

Binomial name
- Emmalocera latilimbella (Ragonot, 1890)

Synonyms
- Papua latilimbella Ragonot, 1890

= Emmalocera latilimbella =

Species of moth

Emmalocera latilimbella is a species of snout moth in the genus Emmalocera. It was described by Ragonot in 1890, and is known from New Guinea and Australia.
