= Emmalocera transecta =

Scientific classification
- Domain: Eukaryota
- Kingdom: Animalia
- Phylum: Arthropoda
- Class: Insecta
- Order: Lepidoptera
- Family: Pyralidae
- Genus: Emmalocera
- Species: E. transecta

Binomial name
- Emmalocera transecta (Turner, 1947)

Synonyms
- Lioprosopa transecta Turner, 1947

Species of moth

Emmalocera transecta is a species of snout moth in the genus Emmalocera described by Alfred Jefferis Turner in 1947. It is found in Australia.
