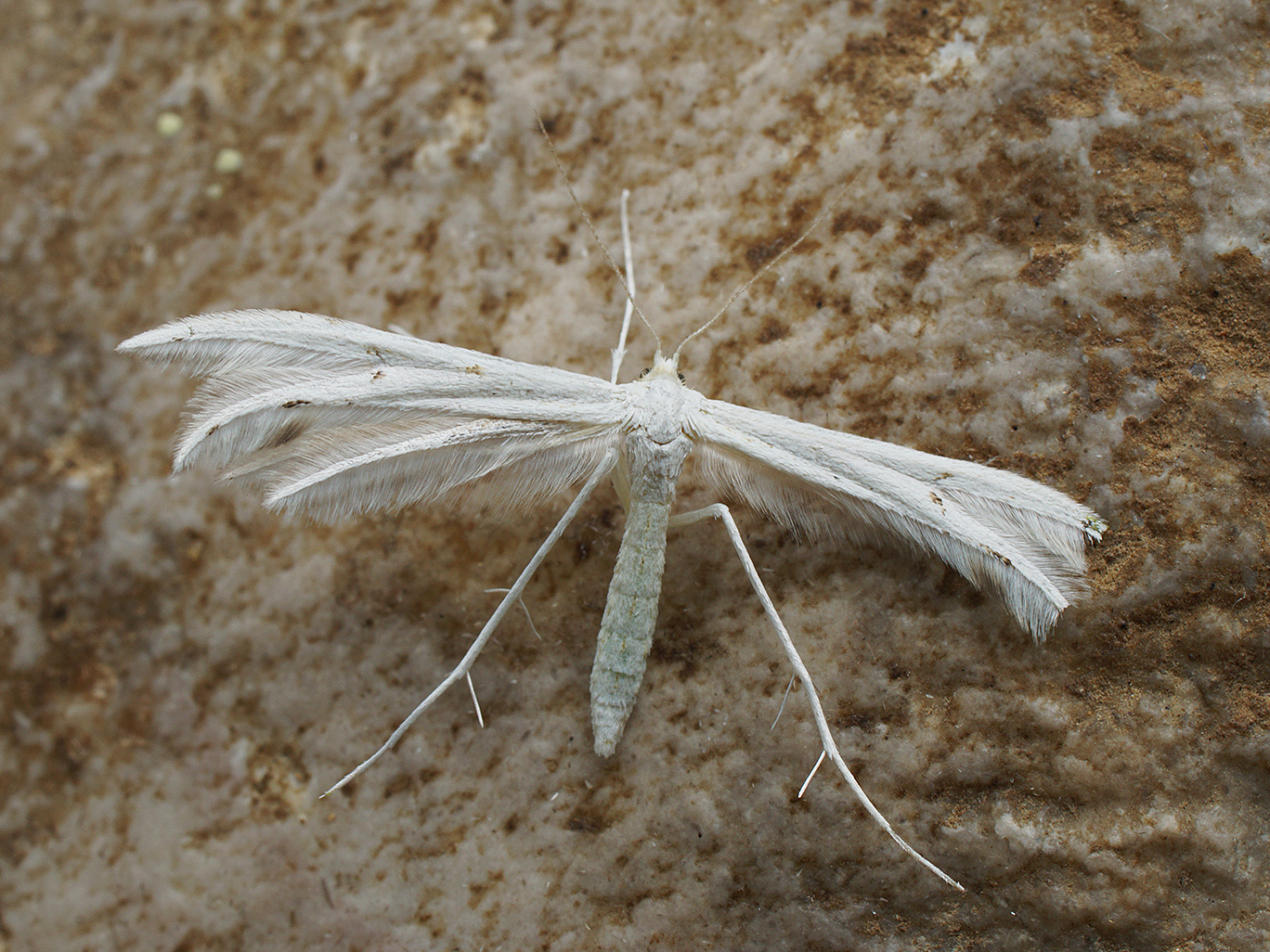

Scientific classification
- Kingdom: Animalia
- Phylum: Arthropoda
- Class: Insecta
- Order: Lepidoptera
- Family: Pterophoridae
- Genus: Porrittia
- Species: P. galactodactyla

Binomial name
- Porrittia galactodactyla (Denis & Schiffermüller, 1775)

Synonyms
- Alucita galactodactyla Denis & Schiffermüller, 1775; Pterophorus galactodactyla

= Porrittia galactodactyla =

Species of plume moth

Porrittia galactodactyla, also known as the spotted white plume, is a moth of the family Pterophoridae. It is known from most of western and central Europe. It was first described by the Austrian lepidopterists, Michael Denis and Ignaz Schiffermüller in 1775.

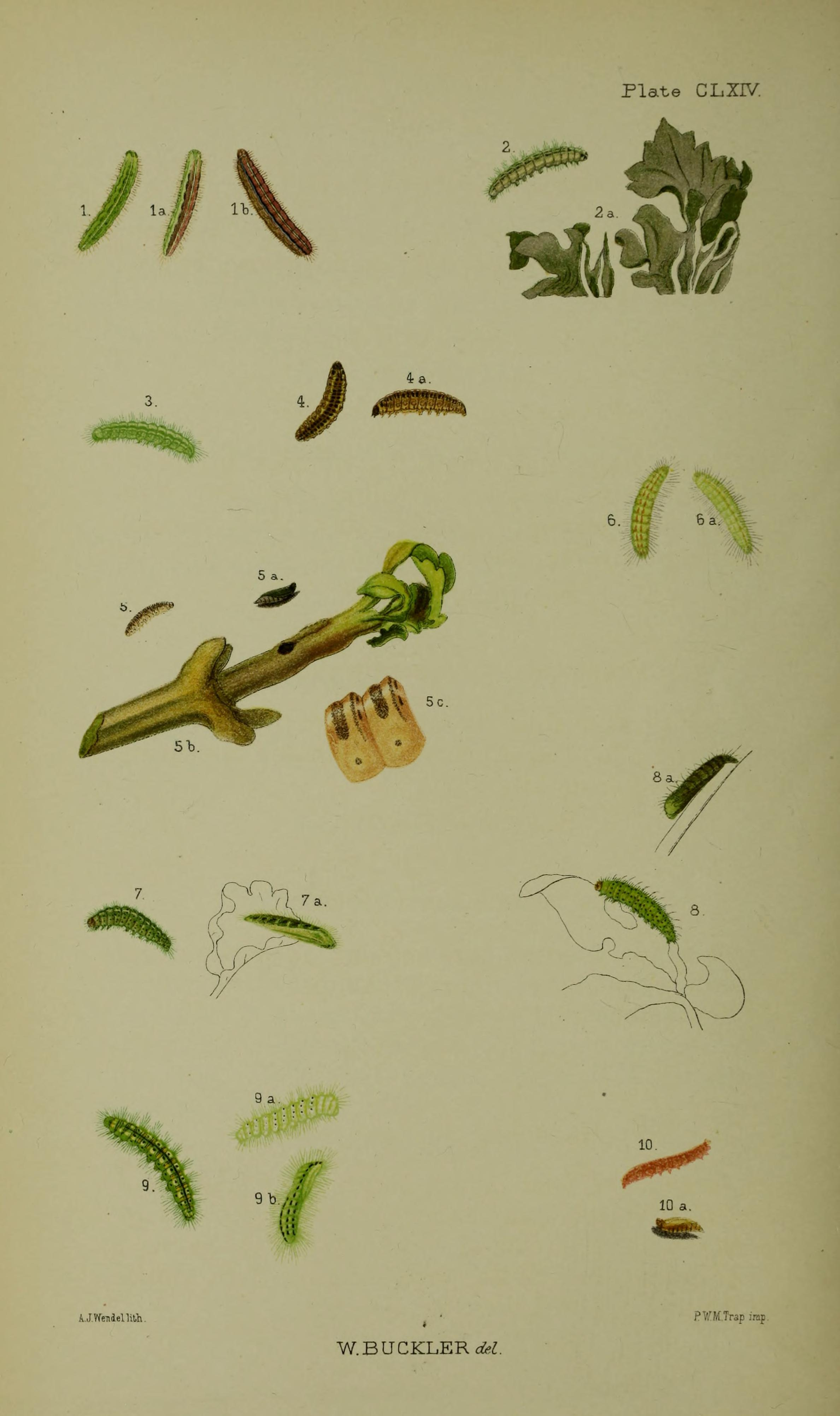
Figs 6, 6a larva after final moult

== Description ==
The wingspan is 20–25 mm. Adults are on wing in June and July in western Europe.

The larvae make characteristic holes in the leaves of lesser burdock (Arctium minus), and possibly greater burdock (Arctium lappa). In April the holes have a 2 mm diameter and by May the holes are about 8 mm. Pupation takes place on the underside of the leaf, mostly near the midrib.
