= Procrica intrepida =

Scientific classification
- Kingdom: Animalia
- Phylum: Arthropoda
- Class: Insecta
- Order: Lepidoptera
- Family: Tortricidae
- Genus: Procrica
- Species: P. intrepida

Binomial name
- Procrica intrepida (Meyrick, 1912)

Synonyms
- Tortrix intrepida Meyrick, 1912; Procrica intrepida obscura Diakonoff, 1960

Species of moth

Procrica intrepida is a species of moth of the family Tortricidae. It is found in Kenya, Madagascar, the Comoros and South Africa, where it has been recorded from open grassland areas in Natal.
