= Emmalocera =

Scientific classification
- Kingdom: Animalia
- Phylum: Arthropoda
- Class: Insecta
- Order: Lepidoptera
- Family: Pyralidae
- Tribe: Anerastiini
- Genus: Emmalocera; Ragonot, 1888

Synonyms
- Ambala Ragonot, 1888; Baroda Ragonot, 1888; Critonia Ragonot, 1891; Enosima Ragonot, 1901; Lodiana Ragonot, 1888; Papua Ragonot, 1890; Pectinigeria Ragonot, 1888; Poujadia Ragonot, 1888; Rhinaphe Berg, 1875; Ampycophora Meyrick, 1882; Phinaphe Berg, 1875; Singhaliella Strand, 1920; Socora Ragonot, 1888

Genus of moths

Emmalocera is a genus of snout moths. It was described by Émile Louis Ragonot in 1888.

== Species ==
- Emmalocera actinoleuca Hampson, 1918
- Emmalocera anerastica (Snellen, 1880)
- Emmalocera apotomella (Meyrick, 1879)
- Emmalocera approximella (Hampson, 1918)
- Emmalocera aurifusellus (Walker, 1866)
- Emmalocera biseriella (Hampson, 1901)
- Emmalocera callirrhoda (Turner, 1904)
- Emmalocera castanealis Hampson, 1912
- Emmalocera celsella (Walker, 1863)
- Emmalocera crenatella Ragonot, 1888
- Emmalocera ctenucha (Turner, 1913)
- Emmalocera dimochla (Turner, 1947)
- Emmalocera distictella (Hampson, 1918)
- Emmalocera endopyrella Hampson, 1918
- Emmalocera eremochroa Hampson, 1918
- Emmalocera eurysticha (Turner, 1904)
- Emmalocera euryzona (Meyrick, 1883)
- Emmalocera flavodorsalis Janse, 1922
- Emmalocera furvimacula (Hampson, 1918)
- Emmalocera fuscostrigella Ragonot, 1888
- Emmalocera haploschema (Turner, 1904)
- Emmalocera holochra (Turner, 1904)
- Emmalocera icasmopis (Turner, 1904)
- Emmalocera laminella Hampson, 1901
- Emmalocera laropis (Turner, 1913)
- Emmalocera lateritiella (Hampson, 1918)
- Emmalocera latilimbella (Ragonot, 1890)
- Emmalocera leucocinctus (Walker, 1863)
- Emmalocera leucopleura (Hampson, 1918)
- Emmalocera longiramella Hampson, 1901
- Emmalocera lutosa Janse, 1922
- Emmalocera macrella Ragonot, 1888
- Emmalocera macrorrhynca (Turner, 1923)
- Emmalocera marcida (Turner, 1923)
- Emmalocera minoralis (Lower, 1903)
- Emmalocera miserabilis (Strand, 1919)
- Emmalocera neesimella Ragonot, 1901
- Emmalocera neotomella (Meyrick, 1879)
- Emmalocera nigricostalis Walker, 1863
- Emmalocera niphopleura (Turner, 1913)
- Emmalocera niphosema (Turner, 1913)
- Emmalocera ochracealis Hampson, 1912
- Emmalocera paucigraphella Ragonot, 1888
- Emmalocera pelochroa (Turner, 1947)
- Emmalocera phaeostrotella (Hampson, 1918)
- Emmalocera phaeoneura (Hampson, 1918)
- Emmalocera platymochla (Turner, 1947)
- Emmalocera pleurochorda (Turner, 1913)
- Emmalocera polychroella Hampson, 1918
- Emmalocera radiatella Hampson, 1901
- Emmalocera rhabdota (Turner, 1904)
- Emmalocera rhodoessa (Turner, 1904)
- Emmalocera rotundipennis de Joannis, 1930
- Emmalocera sangirensis (Hampson, 1918)
- Emmalocera scripta (de Joannis, 1927)
- Emmalocera sepicostella Ragonot, 1888
- Emmalocera signicollis Berg, 1875
- Emmalocera simplicipalpis Strand, 1920
- Emmalocera stereosticha (Turner, 1905)
- Emmalocera stictella (Hampson, 1908)
- Emmalocera strigicostella (Hampson, 1896)
- Emmalocera subconcinnella Ragonot, (1890) 1891
- Emmalocera syssema (Turner, 1913)
- Emmalocera tenuicostella Ragonot, 1888
- Emmalocera thiomochla (Turner, 1947)
- Emmalocera transecta (Turner, 1947)
- Emmalocera tricoloralis Hampson, 1903
- Emmalocera umbricostella Ragonot, 1888
- Emmalocera umbrivittella Ragonot, 1888
- Emmalocera unitella de Joannis, 1927
