= Ptychopseustis plumbeolinealis =

Scientific classification
- Kingdom: Animalia
- Phylum: Arthropoda
- Clade: Pancrustacea
- Class: Insecta
- Order: Lepidoptera
- Family: Crambidae
- Genus: Ptychopseustis
- Species: P. plumbeolinealis

Binomial name
- Ptychopseustis plumbeolinealis (Hampson, 1896)

Synonyms
- Platytes plumbeolinealis Hampson, 1896

Species of moth

Ptychopseustis plumbeolinealis is a moth in the family Crambidae. It is found in India and Sri Lanka.

== Description ==
The wingspan is 18 mm. It is a uniform ochreous moth irrorated (sprinkled) with fuscous. Forewings with the antemedial and postmedial lines prominently silvery, oblique from costa to above middle, then waved and nearly erect to the inner margin. Hindwings with traces of submarginal line.
