= Procrica ochrata =

Scientific classification
- Kingdom: Animalia
- Phylum: Arthropoda
- Class: Insecta
- Order: Lepidoptera
- Family: Tortricidae
- Genus: Procrica
- Species: P. ochrata

Binomial name
- Procrica ochrata Razowski, 2002

Species of moth

Procrica ochrata is a species of moth of the family Tortricidae. It is found in Cameroon.
