= Procrica sanidota =

Scientific classification
- Kingdom: Animalia
- Phylum: Arthropoda
- Class: Insecta
- Order: Lepidoptera
- Family: Tortricidae
- Genus: Procrica
- Species: P. sanidota

Binomial name
- Procrica sanidota (Meyrick, 1912)

Synonyms
- Tortrix sanidota Meyrick, 1912

Species of moth

Procrica sanidota is a species of moth of the family Tortricidae. It is found on Mauritius and the Comoros (Grande Comore, Mayotte) in the Indian Ocean.
