= Parapsectris tholaea =

Scientific classification
- Domain: Eukaryota
- Kingdom: Animalia
- Phylum: Arthropoda
- Class: Insecta
- Order: Lepidoptera
- Family: Gelechiidae
- Genus: Parapsectris
- Species: P. tholaea

Binomial name
- Parapsectris tholaea Meyrick, 1911

Species of moth

Parapsectris tholaea is a moth in the family Gelechiidae. It was described by Edward Meyrick in 1911. It is found in South Africa, Namibia and Zimbabwe.

The wingspan is about 17 mm. The forewings are pale ochreous, the veins and costa suffusedly streaked with rather dark fuscous irroration (sprinkles) and with an irregular broad fuscous streak extending along the dorsum from one-quarter to the tornus, where it terminates abruptly in a darker transverse spot, surmounted by a blackish dot. There is also a blackish dot beneath the costa at the base, one on the fold almost at the base, one on the fold at one-fifth, two on the upper edge of the dorsal streak anteriorly, one towards the costa at one-third, and one in the disc before the middle. The streaks on the veins are suffused and more or less confluent posteriorly. The hindwings are dark grey.
