= Emmalocera actinoleuca =

Scientific classification
- Kingdom: Animalia
- Phylum: Arthropoda
- Class: Insecta
- Order: Lepidoptera
- Family: Pyralidae
- Genus: Emmalocera
- Species: E. actinoleuca

Binomial name
- Emmalocera actinoleuca Hampson, 1918

Species of moth

Emmalocera actinoleuca is a species of snout moth in the genus Emmalocera. It was described by George Hampson, in 1918. It is found in Sierra Leone.
