= Emmalocera laropis =

Scientific classification
- Domain: Eukaryota
- Kingdom: Animalia
- Phylum: Arthropoda
- Class: Insecta
- Order: Lepidoptera
- Family: Pyralidae
- Genus: Emmalocera
- Species: E. laropis

Binomial name
- Emmalocera laropis (Turner, 1913)

Synonyms
- Hypsotropha laropis Turner, 1913

Species of moth

Emmalocera laropis is a species of snout moth in the genus Emmalocera. It is found in Australia.
