= Emmalocera thiomochla =

Scientific classification
- Domain: Eukaryota
- Kingdom: Animalia
- Phylum: Arthropoda
- Class: Insecta
- Order: Lepidoptera
- Family: Pyralidae
- Genus: Emmalocera
- Species: E. thiomochla

Binomial name
- Emmalocera thiomochla (Turner, 1947)

Synonyms
- Lioprosopa thiomochla Turner, 1947

Species of moth

Emmalocera thiomochla is a species of snout moth in the genus Emmalocera described by Alfred Jefferis Turner in 1947. It is found in Australia.
