= Procrica parisii =

Scientific classification
- Kingdom: Animalia
- Phylum: Arthropoda
- Clade: Pancrustacea
- Class: Insecta
- Order: Lepidoptera
- Family: Tortricidae
- Genus: Procrica
- Species: P. parisii

Binomial name
- Procrica parisii Razowski & Trematerra, 2010

Species of moth

Procrica parisii is a species of moth of the family Tortricidae. The species is endemic to Ethiopia, where it is known only from the Bale Mountains. The wingspan is about 22 mm. The head and thorax are cream with a brownish tint, and the labial palpus is brownish. The forewings are cream with sparse brown streaks. The hindwings are cream-grey with a slight brownish tint near the tip.

== Taxonomy ==
Procrica parisii was described by the entomologists J. Razowski and P. Trematerra in 2010 on the basis of an adult male specimen collected from the Dinsho Lodge in the Bale Mountains in Ethiopia. The species is named after Francesco Parisi, who collected the holotype of this species and several other Ethiopian moths.

The species resembles P. ochrata in external morphology.

== Description ==
The wingspan is about 22 mm. The head and thorax are cream with a brownish tint, and the labial palpus is brownish. The forewings are slender, with a slightly curved leading edge (costa) and a gently slanted, somewhat rounded outer edge (termen). The forewings are cream with sparse brown streaks. Brown markings with rusty shading include a large blotch near the base and a central band that merges with markings near the tip and outer edge. The cilia is cream-colored. The hindwings are cream-grey with a slight brownish tint near the tip and cream cilia.

In the male genitalia, the uncus is relatively short and broad, with a slightly curved tip. The socius is of moderate size. The gnathos is also short. The valva is broad and rounded at the back, with a subtle expansion near the upper tip. The sacculus is well hardened (sclerotized) on the upper side and ends in a small free tip. The aedeagus is fairly long and has a delicate tip on the underside.

The appearance of the female is unknown.

== Distribution ==
The species is endemic to Ethiopia, where it is known only from the Bale Mountains.
