= Procrica dinshona =

Scientific classification
- Kingdom: Animalia
- Phylum: Arthropoda
- Class: Insecta
- Order: Lepidoptera
- Family: Tortricidae
- Genus: Procrica
- Species: P. dinshona

Binomial name
- Procrica dinshona Razowski & Trematerra, 2010

Species of moth

Procrica dinshona is a species of moth of the family Tortricidae. The species is endemic to Ethiopia, where it is known only from the Bale Mountains. The wingspan is about 25 mm. The head and thorax are yellow with orange shading, while the labial palpus is brownish. The forewings are yellow with a slight orange tint, decorated with fine brown and pale brown streaks and dots. The hindwings are creamy grey.

== Taxonomy ==
Procrica dinshona was described by the entomologists J. Razowski and P. Trematerra in 2010 on the basis of an adult male specimen collected from the Bale Mountains in Ethiopia. The specific epithet refers to the Dinsho Lodge, where the species was first collected.

The species resembles P. ophiographa in external morphology.

== Description ==
The wingspan is about 25 mm. The head and thorax are yellow with orange shading, while the labial palpus is brownish. The forewings are fairly narrow and do not widen at the tips. The leading edge (costa) is curved mostly up to the middle, and the outer edge (termen) is clearly slanted and straight. The forewings are yellow with a slight orange tint, decorated with fine brown and pale brown streaks and dots. The base and inner corner (tornal area) are shaded reddish-brown. The wing markings are reddish-brown with brown-grey edges, except for a subapical blotch. The cilia match the wing color and have a faint rust-colored line at the base. The hindwings are a creamy grey, with paler cilia.

In the male genitalia, the uncus is relatively broad and rounded at the tip. The socius is fairly large. The gnathos has the typical structure found in this genus. The valva curves upward only slightly and has a rounded rear end. The sacculus is broad, ending in a short tip, and features a well-developed lobe on the upper side. The aedeagus is long and slender, with a curved coecum penis.

The appearance of the female is unknown.

== Distribution ==
The species is endemic to Ethiopia, where it is known only from the Bale Mountains.
