= Emmalocera macrella =

Scientific classification
- Kingdom: Animalia
- Phylum: Arthropoda
- Clade: Pancrustacea
- Class: Insecta
- Order: Lepidoptera
- Family: Pyralidae
- Genus: Emmalocera
- Species: E. macrella

Binomial name
- Emmalocera macrella (Ragonot, 1888)

Synonyms
- Pectinigeria macrella Ragonot, 1888

Species of moth

Emmalocera macrella is a species of snout moth in the genus Emmalocera. It was described by Émile Louis Ragonot in 1888. It is found in South Africa.
