= Emmalocera endopyrella =

Scientific classification
- Domain: Eukaryota
- Kingdom: Animalia
- Phylum: Arthropoda
- Class: Insecta
- Order: Lepidoptera
- Family: Pyralidae
- Genus: Emmalocera
- Species: E. endopyrella

Binomial name
- Emmalocera endopyrella Hampson, 1918

Species of moth

Emmalocera endopyrella is a species of snout moth, family Pyralidae. It was described by George Hampson in 1918. It is found in Assam, India.
