= Parapsectris ochrocosma =

Scientific classification
- Domain: Eukaryota
- Kingdom: Animalia
- Phylum: Arthropoda
- Class: Insecta
- Order: Lepidoptera
- Family: Gelechiidae
- Genus: Parapsectris
- Species: P. ochrocosma

Binomial name
- Parapsectris ochrocosma (Meyrick, 1911)

Synonyms
- Epithectis ochrocosma Meyrick, 1911; Athrips ochrocosma

Species of moth

Parapsectris ochrocosma is a moth in the family Gelechiidae. It was described by Edward Meyrick in 1911. It is found in Namibia, Zimbabwe and the South African provinces of Gauteng, Limpopo and KwaZulu-Natal.

The wingspan is about 14 mm. The forewings are fuscous, irregularly sprinkled with white and with three light reddish-ochreous longitudinal streaks from the base to about one-third, the upper receiving an oblique white strigula from the costa. There are three white longitudinal streaks between and beyond these below the middle of the wing. The discal stigmata are black edged with light reddish ochreous, connected by a white line along the upper margin of the cell, with the plical hardly indicated, the second discal connected with the dorsum by a blackish spot edged with light reddish ochreous. The posterior area is streaked with pale reddish ochreous on the veins and along the termen and there is a series of very undefined blackish dots along the posterior part of the costa and termen. The hindwings are grey.
