= Emmalocera stereosticha =

Scientific classification
- Domain: Eukaryota
- Kingdom: Animalia
- Phylum: Arthropoda
- Class: Insecta
- Order: Lepidoptera
- Family: Pyralidae
- Genus: Emmalocera
- Species: E. stereosticha

Binomial name
- Emmalocera stereosticha (Turner, 1905)

Synonyms
- Hypsotropha stereosticha Turner, 1905

Species of moth

Emmalocera stereosticha is a species of snout moth in the genus Emmalocera. It was described by Alfred Jefferis Turner in 1905 and is found in Australia.
