= Emmalocera tricoloralis =

Scientific classification
- Kingdom: Animalia
- Phylum: Arthropoda
- Class: Insecta
- Order: Lepidoptera
- Family: Pyralidae
- Genus: Emmalocera
- Species: E. tricoloralis

Binomial name
- Emmalocera tricoloralis (Hampson, 1903)

Synonyms
- Polyocha tricoloralis Hampson, 1903

Species of moth

Emmalocera tricoloralis is a species of snout moth in the genus Emmalocera. It was described by George Hampson in 1903. It is found in India.
