= Ptychopseustis argentisparsalis =

Scientific classification
- Kingdom: Animalia
- Phylum: Arthropoda
- Clade: Pancrustacea
- Class: Insecta
- Order: Lepidoptera
- Family: Crambidae
- Genus: Ptychopseustis
- Species: P. argentisparsalis

Binomial name
- Ptychopseustis argentisparsalis (Snellen, 1880)

Synonyms
- Platytes argentisparsalis Snellen, 1880

Species of moth

Ptychopseustis argentisparsalis is a moth in the family Crambidae. It is found in Sri Lanka.

== Description ==
The wingspan is 18 mm. Forewings with slightly indented outer margin at vein 6. Body dark fuscous and prominently irrorated (sprinkled) with black scales. Forewings with brilliant silver line from base of costa to median nervure near angle of cell, then erect to inner margin, with a black spot inside it below cell. A curved silver fascia found on subcostal nervure at end of cell and a spot at lower angle. The silvery submarginal line more excurved below costa and nearer the margin. The marginal specks more prominent and on a grey band.
