= Parapsectris lacunosa =

Scientific classification
- Kingdom: Animalia
- Phylum: Arthropoda
- Class: Insecta
- Order: Lepidoptera
- Family: Gelechiidae
- Genus: Parapsectris
- Species: P. lacunosa

Binomial name
- Parapsectris lacunosa (Meyrick, 1918)

Synonyms
- Epithectis lacunosa Meyrick, 1918; Athrips lacunosa

Species of moth

Parapsectris lacunosa is a moth in the family Gelechiidae. It was described by Edward Meyrick in 1918. It is found in Namibia and the South African provinces of KwaZulu-Natal and Gauteng.

The wingspan is about 10 mm. The forewings are reddish ochreous or ferruginous with the markings grey irrorated (sprinkled) with black. There is a narrow fascia from the base of the costa to the dorsum before the middle and a narrow oblique fascia from the costa at one-fourth, below the middle running into a narrow fascia which runs from a flattened-triangular blotch on the middle of the costa to the dorsum beyond the middle and coalesces there with the first fascia. There is also a patch of irregular marbling towards the costa posteriorly, connected by a very irregular blotch with the dorsum before the tornus, edged posteriorly by a white mark near the dorsum. The hindwings are slaty grey.
