= Emmalocera platymochla =

Scientific classification
- Kingdom: Animalia
- Phylum: Arthropoda
- Clade: Pancrustacea
- Class: Insecta
- Order: Lepidoptera
- Family: Pyralidae
- Genus: Emmalocera
- Species: E. platymochla

Binomial name
- Emmalocera platymochla (Turner, 1947)

Synonyms
- Lioprosopa platymochla Turner, 1947

Species of moth

Emmalocera platymochla is a species of snout moth in the genus Emmalocera. It was described by Alfred Jefferis Turner in 1947 and is found in Australia. The species was originally described as Lioprosopa platymochla by Alfred Jefferis Turner in 1947 before being transferred to the genus Emmalocera.
