= Emmalocera callirrhoda =

Scientific classification
- Domain: Eukaryota
- Kingdom: Animalia
- Phylum: Arthropoda
- Class: Insecta
- Order: Lepidoptera
- Family: Pyralidae
- Genus: Emmalocera
- Species: E. callirrhoda

Binomial name
- Emmalocera callirrhoda (Turner, 1904)

Synonyms
- Poujadia callirrhoda Turner, 1904

Species of moth

Emmalocera callirrhoda is a species of snout moth in the genus Emmalocera. It was described by Alfred Jefferis Turner in 1904 and is found in Queensland, Australia.
