= Parapsectris ferax =

Scientific classification
- Kingdom: Animalia
- Phylum: Arthropoda
- Class: Insecta
- Order: Lepidoptera
- Family: Gelechiidae
- Genus: Parapsectris
- Species: P. ferax

Binomial name
- Parapsectris ferax (Meyrick, 1913)

Synonyms
- Gelechia ferax Meyrick, 1913

Species of moth

Parapsectris ferax is a moth in the family Gelechiidae. It was described by Edward Meyrick in 1913. It is found in Mpumalanga, South Africa.

The wingspan is 15–17 mm. The forewings are yellow ochreous, sometimes suffused with ferruginous towards the costa and dorsum. The veins are streaked with purplish-fuscous suffusion sometimes tinged with crimson. There is a streak of purplish-fuscous suffusion along the costa from more or less near the base to the apex and there is a patch of purplish-fuscous suffusion along the dorsum from about one-third to the tornus, then continued as a slender streak along the termen. The stigmata are minute and black, with the first discal placed higher than the second, sometimes obsolete, the plical larger, before the first discal, sometimes additional minute black dots on the fold before and beyond the plical. The hindwings are grey.
