= Parapsectris opaula =

Scientific classification
- Domain: Eukaryota
- Kingdom: Animalia
- Phylum: Arthropoda
- Class: Insecta
- Order: Lepidoptera
- Family: Gelechiidae
- Genus: Parapsectris
- Species: P. opaula

Binomial name
- Parapsectris opaula (Meyrick, 1911)

Synonyms
- Gelechia opaula Meyrick, 1911

Species of moth

Parapsectris opaula is a moth in the family Gelechiidae. It was described by Edward Meyrick in 1911. It is found in Limpopo, South Africa.

The wingspan is about 15 mm. The forewings are yellow ochreous, the veins marked with streaks of tannish peach sprinkled with fuscous. There are slight dots of two or three blackish scales beneath the costa near the base, and on the fold before the plical stigma. The stigmata are minute and blackish, with the plical before the first discal and the second discal below the middle. There are a few blackish scales indicating obscure dots around the posterior part of the costa and termen. The hindwings are grey.
