= Parapsectris alfonsi =

Scientific classification
- Domain: Eukaryota
- Kingdom: Animalia
- Phylum: Arthropoda
- Class: Insecta
- Order: Lepidoptera
- Family: Gelechiidae
- Genus: Parapsectris
- Species: P. alfonsi

Binomial name
- Parapsectris alfonsi Bidzilya, 2010

Species of moth

Parapsectris alfonsi is a moth in the family Gelechiidae. It was described by Oleksiy V. Bidzilya in 2010. It is found in Namibia.
