= Emmalocera stictella =

Scientific classification
- Kingdom: Animalia
- Phylum: Arthropoda
- Class: Insecta
- Order: Lepidoptera
- Family: Pyralidae
- Genus: Emmalocera
- Species: E. stictella

Binomial name
- Emmalocera stictella Hampson, 1908

Synonyms
- Anerastia stictella Hampson, 1908

Species of moth

Emmalocera stictella is a species of snout moth in the genus Emmalocera. It was described by George Hampson in 1908. It is found in India.
