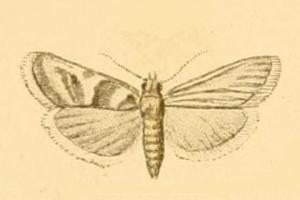

Scientific classification
- Domain: Eukaryota
- Kingdom: Animalia
- Phylum: Arthropoda
- Class: Insecta
- Order: Lepidoptera
- Family: Pyralidae
- Genus: Bazaria
- Species: B. sieversi

Binomial name
- Bazaria sieversi (Christoph, 1877)

Synonyms
- Myelois sieversi Christoph, 1877

= Bazaria sieversi =

Species of moth

Bazaria sieversi is a species of snout moth in the genus Bazaria. It was described by Hugo Theodor Christoph in 1877 and is known from Turkmenistan
