= Emmalocera subconcinnella =

Scientific classification
- Domain: Eukaryota
- Kingdom: Animalia
- Phylum: Arthropoda
- Class: Insecta
- Order: Lepidoptera
- Family: Pyralidae
- Genus: Emmalocera
- Species: E. subconcinnella

Binomial name
- Emmalocera subconcinnella Ragonot, 1890

Synonyms
- Critonia subconcinnella Ragonot, 1891

Species of moth

Emmalocera subconcinnella is a species of snout moth in the genus Emmalocera. It was described by Émile Louis Ragonot in 1890. It is found in Burma.
