= Emmalocera lateritiella =

Scientific classification
- Kingdom: Animalia
- Phylum: Arthropoda
- Class: Insecta
- Order: Lepidoptera
- Family: Pyralidae
- Genus: Emmalocera
- Species: E. lateritiella

Binomial name
- Emmalocera lateritiella (Hampson, 1918)

Synonyms
- Rhinaphe lateritiella Hampson, 1918

Species of moth

Emmalocera lateritiella is a species of snout moth in the genus Emmalocera. It was described by George Hampson in 1918. It is found in Nigeria.
