= Emmalocera sepicostella =

Scientific classification
- Domain: Eukaryota
- Kingdom: Animalia
- Phylum: Arthropoda
- Class: Insecta
- Order: Lepidoptera
- Family: Pyralidae
- Genus: Emmalocera
- Species: E. sepicostella

Binomial name
- Emmalocera sepicostella (Ragonot, 1888)

Synonyms
- Poujadia sepicostella Ragonot, 1888

Species of moth

Emmalocera sepicostella is a species of snout moth in the genus Emmalocera. It was described by Émile Louis Ragonot in 1888. It is found in India, Borneo and Taiwan.
