= Emmalocera signicollis =

Scientific classification
- Domain: Eukaryota
- Kingdom: Animalia
- Phylum: Arthropoda
- Class: Insecta
- Order: Lepidoptera
- Family: Pyralidae
- Genus: Emmalocera
- Species: E. signicollis

Binomial name
- Emmalocera signicollis (Berg, 1875)

Synonyms
- Rhinaphe signicollis Berg, 1875

Species of moth

Emmalocera signicollis is a species of snout moth in the genus Emmalocera. It was described by Carlos Berg in 1875. It is found in Argentina.
