= Emmalocera syssema =

Scientific classification
- Domain: Eukaryota
- Kingdom: Animalia
- Phylum: Arthropoda
- Class: Insecta
- Order: Lepidoptera
- Family: Pyralidae
- Genus: Emmalocera
- Species: E. syssema

Binomial name
- Emmalocera syssema (Turner, 1913)

Synonyms
- Anerastria syssema Turner, 1913

Species of moth

Emmalocera syssema is a species of snout moth in the genus Emmalocera described by Alfred Jefferis Turner in 1913. It is found in Australia (Queensland, northern Australia and Western Australia).
