= Ptychopseustis pallidochrealis =

Scientific classification
- Kingdom: Animalia
- Phylum: Arthropoda
- Clade: Pancrustacea
- Class: Insecta
- Order: Lepidoptera
- Family: Crambidae
- Genus: Ptychopseustis
- Species: P. pallidochrealis

Binomial name
- Ptychopseustis pallidochrealis Yamanaka, 2004

Species of moth

Ptychopseustis pallidochrealis is a moth in the family Crambidae. It is found in Japan, where it has been recorded from Okinawa.
