= Emmalocera eremochroa =

Scientific classification
- Kingdom: Animalia
- Phylum: Arthropoda
- Class: Insecta
- Order: Lepidoptera
- Family: Pyralidae
- Genus: Emmalocera
- Species: E. eremochroa

Binomial name
- Emmalocera eremochroa Hampson, 1918

Species of moth

Emmalocera eremochroa is a species of snout moth in the genus Emmalocera. It is found in the Australian state of Western Australia.
