= Emmalocera marcida =

Scientific classification
- Domain: Eukaryota
- Kingdom: Animalia
- Phylum: Arthropoda
- Class: Insecta
- Order: Lepidoptera
- Family: Pyralidae
- Genus: Emmalocera
- Species: E. marcida

Binomial name
- Emmalocera marcida (Turner, 1923)

Synonyms
- Anerastria marcida Turner, 1923

Species of moth

Emmalocera marcida is a species of snout moth in the genus Emmalocera. It is found in Australia.
