= Bazaria nomiella =

Scientific classification
- Domain: Eukaryota
- Kingdom: Animalia
- Phylum: Arthropoda
- Class: Insecta
- Order: Lepidoptera
- Family: Pyralidae
- Genus: Bazaria
- Species: B. nomiella

Binomial name
- Bazaria nomiella (Ragonot, 1887)

Synonyms
- Anoristia nomiella Ragonot, 1887

Species of moth

Bazaria nomiella is a species of snout moth in the genus Bazaria. It was described by Émile Louis Ragonot in 1887, and is known from Transcaucasia.
