= Procrica mariepskopa =

Scientific classification
- Kingdom: Animalia
- Phylum: Arthropoda
- Clade: Pancrustacea
- Class: Insecta
- Order: Lepidoptera
- Family: Tortricidae
- Genus: Procrica
- Species: P. mariepskopa

Binomial name
- Procrica mariepskopa Razowski, 2008

Species of moth

Procrica mariepskopa is a species of moth of the family Tortricidae. It is found in South Africa.

The wingspan is 13 mm for males and 17 mm for females.
