= Emmalocera miserabilis =

Scientific classification
- Domain: Eukaryota
- Kingdom: Animalia
- Phylum: Arthropoda
- Class: Insecta
- Order: Lepidoptera
- Family: Pyralidae
- Genus: Emmalocera
- Species: E. miserabilis

Binomial name
- Emmalocera miserabilis (Strand, 1919)

Synonyms
- Patna miserabilis Strand, 1919

Species of moth

Emmalocera miserabilis is a species of moth of the family Pyralidae. It was described in 1919 by Embrik Strand and is found in Taiwan and Hong Kong.
