= Parapsectris exstincta =

Scientific classification
- Domain: Eukaryota
- Kingdom: Animalia
- Phylum: Arthropoda
- Class: Insecta
- Order: Lepidoptera
- Family: Gelechiidae
- Genus: Parapsectris
- Species: P. exstincta

Binomial name
- Parapsectris exstincta (Meyrick, 1911)

Synonyms
- Gelechia exstincta Meyrick, 1911; Athrips exstincta

Species of moth

Parapsectris exstincta is a moth in the family Gelechiidae. It was described by Edward Meyrick in 1911. It is found in the South African provinces of Gauteng and Mpumalanga.

The wingspan is about 14 mm. The forewings are dark ashy fuscous, obscurely streaked with blackish irroration (sprinkles) on the veins. The plical stigma are represented by three or four ochreous-whitish scales. The hindwings are grey.
