= Emmalocera flavodorsalis =

Scientific classification
- Domain: Eukaryota
- Kingdom: Animalia
- Phylum: Arthropoda
- Class: Insecta
- Order: Lepidoptera
- Family: Pyralidae
- Genus: Emmalocera
- Species: E. flavodorsalis

Binomial name
- Emmalocera flavodorsalis (Janse, 1922)

Synonyms
- Rhinaphe flavodorsalis Janse, 1922

Species of moth

Emmalocera flavodorsalis is a species of snout moth in the genus Emmalocera. It was described by Anthonie Johannes Theodorus Janse in 1922. It is found in South Africa.
