= Ptychopseustis calamochroa =

Scientific classification
- Kingdom: Animalia
- Phylum: Arthropoda
- Clade: Pancrustacea
- Class: Insecta
- Order: Lepidoptera
- Family: Crambidae
- Genus: Ptychopseustis
- Species: P. calamochroa

Binomial name
- Ptychopseustis calamochroa (Hampson, 1896)

Synonyms
- Argyria calamochroa Hampson, 1896

Species of moth

Ptychopseustis calamochroa is a moth in the family Crambidae. It is found in Kenya, Malawi, Mozambique, Nigeria and South Africa.
