= Bazaria djiroftella =

Scientific classification
- Domain: Eukaryota
- Kingdom: Animalia
- Phylum: Arthropoda
- Class: Insecta
- Order: Lepidoptera
- Family: Pyralidae
- Genus: Bazaria
- Species: B. djiroftella

Binomial name
- Bazaria djiroftella (Amsel, 1959)

Synonyms
- Culcita djiroftella Amsel, 1959; Culcitaria djiroftella Amsel, 1959

Species of moth

Bazaria djiroftella is a species of snout moth in the genus Bazaria. It was described by Hans Georg Amsel in 1959. It was described from Persia.
