= Emmalocera apotomella =

Scientific classification
- Kingdom: Animalia
- Phylum: Arthropoda
- Class: Insecta
- Order: Lepidoptera
- Family: Pyralidae
- Genus: Emmalocera
- Species: E. apotomella

Binomial name
- Emmalocera apotomella (Meyrick, 1879)

Synonyms
- Pempelia apotomella Meyrick, 1879

Species of moth

Emmalocera apotomella is a species of snout moth in the genus Emmalocera. It was described by Edward Meyrick in 1879. It is found in Australia (Queensland), India, Sri Lanka, the Philippines, Sulawesi and Timor.
