= Emmalocera minoralis =

Scientific classification
- Domain: Eukaryota
- Kingdom: Animalia
- Phylum: Arthropoda
- Class: Insecta
- Order: Lepidoptera
- Family: Pyralidae
- Genus: Emmalocera
- Species: E. minoralis

Binomial name
- Emmalocera minoralis (Lower, 1903)

Synonyms
- Anerastia minoralis Lower, 1903

Species of moth

Emmalocera minoralis is a species of snout moth in the genus Emmalocera. It is found in Australia (Queensland).
