= Ancylodes penicillata =

Scientific classification
- Kingdom: Animalia
- Phylum: Arthropoda
- Class: Insecta
- Order: Lepidoptera
- Family: Pyralidae
- Genus: Ancylodes
- Species: A. penicillata

Binomial name
- Ancylodes penicillata Turner, 1905

Species of moth

Ancylodes penicillata is a species of snout moth in the genus Ancylodes described by Alfred Jefferis Turner in 1905. It is found in Australia.
