= Bazaria umbrifasciella =

Scientific classification
- Kingdom: Animalia
- Phylum: Arthropoda
- Class: Insecta
- Order: Lepidoptera
- Family: Pyralidae
- Genus: Bazaria
- Species: B. umbrifasciella

Binomial name
- Bazaria umbrifasciella (Ragonot, 1887)

Synonyms
- Anoristia umbrifasciella Ragonot, 1887; Heterographis conchyliella Ragonot, 1887

Species of moth

Bazaria umbrifasciella is a species of snout moth in the genus Bazaria. It was described by Émile Louis Ragonot in 1887. It is found in Uzbekistan.
