= Bazaria turensis =

Scientific classification
- Domain: Eukaryota
- Kingdom: Animalia
- Phylum: Arthropoda
- Class: Insecta
- Order: Lepidoptera
- Family: Pyralidae
- Genus: Bazaria
- Species: B. turensis

Binomial name
- Bazaria turensis Ragonot, 1887

Species of moth

Bazaria turensis is a species of snout moth in the genus Bazaria. It was described by Ragonot, in 1887. It is found in Kazakhstan, Tunisia, Algeria, Mauritania, Iran, Armenia, Russia and central China, Asia.

The wingspan is about 17 mm.

The larvae have been recorded feeding on Nitraria roborowskii. They roll the leaves of their host plant.
