= Ptychopseustis lucipara =

Scientific classification
- Kingdom: Animalia
- Phylum: Arthropoda
- Clade: Pancrustacea
- Class: Insecta
- Order: Lepidoptera
- Family: Crambidae
- Genus: Ptychopseustis
- Species: P. lucipara

Binomial name
- Ptychopseustis lucipara Mey, 2011

Species of moth

Ptychopseustis lucipara is a moth in the family Crambidae. It is found in Namibia and South Africa.
