= Bazaria dulanensis =

Scientific classification
- Domain: Eukaryota
- Kingdom: Animalia
- Phylum: Arthropoda
- Class: Insecta
- Order: Lepidoptera
- Family: Pyralidae
- Genus: Bazaria
- Species: B. dulanensis

Binomial name
- Bazaria dulanensis Y.L. Du & L. Yan, 2009

Species of moth

Bazaria dulanensis is a species of snout moth in the genus Bazaria. It was described by Y.L. Du and L. Yan in 2009. It is found in Qinghai, China.

The wingspan is 17–18 mm.

The larvae mine the leaves of Nitrada tangutorum.

== Etymology ==
The specific name refers to the type locality Dulan.
