= Emmalocera longiramella =

Scientific classification
- Kingdom: Animalia
- Phylum: Arthropoda
- Class: Insecta
- Order: Lepidoptera
- Family: Pyralidae
- Genus: Emmalocera
- Species: E. longiramella

Binomial name
- Emmalocera longiramella Hampson, 1901

Species of moth

Emmalocera longiramella is a species of snout moth in the genus Emmalocera. It is found in Australia.
