= Procrica pilgrima =

Scientific classification
- Kingdom: Animalia
- Phylum: Arthropoda
- Class: Insecta
- Order: Lepidoptera
- Family: Tortricidae
- Genus: Procrica
- Species: P. pilgrima

Binomial name
- Procrica pilgrima Razowski, 2008

Species of moth

Procrica pilgrima is a species of moth of the family Tortricidae. It is found in South Africa.

The wingspan is about 16 mm.

== Etymology ==
The species name refers to the Pilgrim's Rest District, the type locality.
