= Choanograptis didyma =

Scientific classification
- Kingdom: Animalia
- Phylum: Arthropoda
- Class: Insecta
- Order: Lepidoptera
- Family: Tortricidae
- Genus: Choanograptis
- Species: C. didyma

Binomial name
- Choanograptis didyma Meyrick, 1938

Species of moth

Choanograptis didyma is a species of moth of the family Tortricidae. It is found in New Guinea.
