= Procrica parva =

Scientific classification
- Kingdom: Animalia
- Phylum: Arthropoda
- Class: Insecta
- Order: Lepidoptera
- Family: Tortricidae
- Genus: Procrica
- Species: P. parva

Binomial name
- Procrica parva Razowski, 2002

Species of moth

Procrica parva is a species of moth of the family Tortricidae. It is found in Kenya.
