= Procrica diarda =

Scientific classification
- Domain: Eukaryota
- Kingdom: Animalia
- Phylum: Arthropoda
- Class: Insecta
- Order: Lepidoptera
- Family: Tortricidae
- Genus: Procrica
- Species: P. diarda

Binomial name
- Procrica diarda Diakonoff, 1983

Species of moth

Procrica diarda is a species of moth of the family Tortricidae. It is found on the Comoros in the Indian Ocean.
