= Ptychopseustis eutacta =

Scientific classification
- Kingdom: Animalia
- Phylum: Arthropoda
- Clade: Pancrustacea
- Class: Insecta
- Order: Lepidoptera
- Family: Crambidae
- Genus: Ptychopseustis
- Species: P. eutacta

Binomial name
- Ptychopseustis eutacta (Turner, 1908)

Synonyms
- Noorda eutacta Turner, 1908

Species of moth

Ptychopseustis eutacta is a moth in the family Crambidae. It is found in Australia, where it has been recorded from Queensland.

The wingspan is about 13 mm.
