= Procrica imitans =

Scientific classification
- Domain: Eukaryota
- Kingdom: Animalia
- Phylum: Arthropoda
- Class: Insecta
- Order: Lepidoptera
- Family: Tortricidae
- Genus: Procrica
- Species: P. imitans

Binomial name
- Procrica imitans (Diakonoff, 1947)

Synonyms
- Cnephasia imitans Diakonoff, 1947

Species of moth

Procrica imitans is a species of moth of the family Tortricidae. It is found in Madagascar.
