= Emmalocera niphosema =

Scientific classification
- Kingdom: Animalia
- Phylum: Arthropoda
- Class: Insecta
- Order: Lepidoptera
- Family: Pyralidae
- Genus: Emmalocera
- Species: E. niphosema

Binomial name
- Emmalocera niphosema (Turner, 1913)

Synonyms
- Hypsotropha niphosema Turner, 1913

Species of moth

Emmalocera niphosema is a species of snout moth in the genus Emmalocera. It is found in Queensland, Australia.
