= Choanograptis fasciata =

Scientific classification
- Domain: Eukaryota
- Kingdom: Animalia
- Phylum: Arthropoda
- Class: Insecta
- Order: Lepidoptera
- Family: Tortricidae
- Genus: Choanograptis
- Species: C. fasciata

Binomial name
- Choanograptis fasciata Diakonoff, 1952

Species of moth

Choanograptis fasciata is a species of moth of the family Tortricidae. It is found in New Guinea.
