= Emmalocera biseriella =

Scientific classification
- Kingdom: Animalia
- Phylum: Arthropoda
- Clade: Pancrustacea
- Class: Insecta
- Order: Lepidoptera
- Family: Pyralidae
- Genus: Emmalocera
- Species: E. biseriella

Binomial name
- Emmalocera biseriella (Hampson, 1901)

Synonyms
- Anerastia biseriella Hampson, 1901; Anerastia xiphimela Lower, 1903; Hypsotropha pleurosticha Turner, 1904

Species of moth

Emmalocera biseriella is a species of snout moth in the genus Emmalocera. It is found in Australia.
