= Emmalocera polychroella =

Scientific classification
- Domain: Eukaryota
- Kingdom: Animalia
- Phylum: Arthropoda
- Class: Insecta
- Order: Lepidoptera
- Family: Pyralidae
- Genus: Emmalocera
- Species: E. polychroella

Binomial name
- Emmalocera polychroella Hampson, 1918

Species of moth

Emmalocera polychroella is a species of snout moth in the genus Emmalocera. It was described by George Hampson in 1918. It is found in western Africa.
