= Emmalocera anerastica =

Scientific classification
- Kingdom: Animalia
- Phylum: Arthropoda
- Class: Insecta
- Order: Lepidoptera
- Family: Pyralidae
- Genus: Emmalocera
- Species: E. anerastica

Binomial name
- Emmalocera anerastica (Snellen, 1880)

Synonyms
- Nephopteryx anerastica Snellen, 1880; Lodiana albicostalis Hampson, 1900

Species of moth

Emmalocera anerastica is a species of snout moth in the genus Emmalocera. It was described by Snellen in 1880, and is known from India, the Nicobar Islands, Singapore, Sumatra, Borneo, the Philippines, Taiwan, Spain and North Africa.
