= Parapsectris fastidiosa =

Scientific classification
- Kingdom: Animalia
- Phylum: Arthropoda
- Clade: Pancrustacea
- Class: Insecta
- Order: Lepidoptera
- Family: Gelechiidae
- Genus: Parapsectris
- Species: P. fastidiosa

Binomial name
- Parapsectris fastidiosa Meyrick, 1911

Species of moth

Parapsectris fastidiosa is a moth in the family Gelechiidae. It was described by Edward Meyrick in 1911. It is found in the South African province of Limpopo and in Namibia.

The wingspan is about 13 mm. The forewings are ochreous yellow with an oblique series of three minute black dots running from beneath the costa near the base towards a fuscous spot on the dorsum before the middle. There is a black dot beneath the costa beyond one-third and a triangular fuscous spot on the costa beyond the middle, and an irregular blotch before the apex. An irregular fuscous blotch is found on the dorsum before the tornus, its upper angles forming irregular projections reaching more than halfway across the wing, between which is a black dot representing the second discal stigma. The hindwings are grey.
