= Ptychopseustis molybdogramma =

Scientific classification
- Kingdom: Animalia
- Phylum: Arthropoda
- Clade: Pancrustacea
- Class: Insecta
- Order: Lepidoptera
- Family: Crambidae
- Genus: Ptychopseustis
- Species: P. molybdogramma

Binomial name
- Ptychopseustis molybdogramma (Hampson, 1919)

Synonyms
- Argyria molybdogramma Hampson, 1919

Species of moth

Ptychopseustis molybdogramma is a moth in the family Crambidae. It is found in Australia, where it has been recorded from Queensland.

The wingspan is about 16 mm. The forewings are pale creamy yellow suffused with rufous, the costal edge blackish towards the base. The antemedial line is black diffused with silver. The hindwings are whitish, the terminal area tinged with rufous.
