= Procrica ophiograpta =

Scientific classification
- Kingdom: Animalia
- Phylum: Arthropoda
- Class: Insecta
- Order: Lepidoptera
- Family: Tortricidae
- Genus: Procrica
- Species: P. ophiograpta

Binomial name
- Procrica ophiograpta (Meyrick, 1932)

Synonyms
- Tortrix ophiograpta Meyrick, 1932

Species of moth

Procrica ophiograpta is a species of moth of the family Tortricidae. It is found in Ethiopia and Uganda.
