= Ptychopseustis =

Scientific classification
- Kingdom: Animalia
- Phylum: Arthropoda
- Clade: Pancrustacea
- Class: Insecta
- Order: Lepidoptera
- Family: Crambidae
- Subfamily: Cybalomiinae
- Genus: Ptychopseustis; Meyrick, 1889

Genus of moths

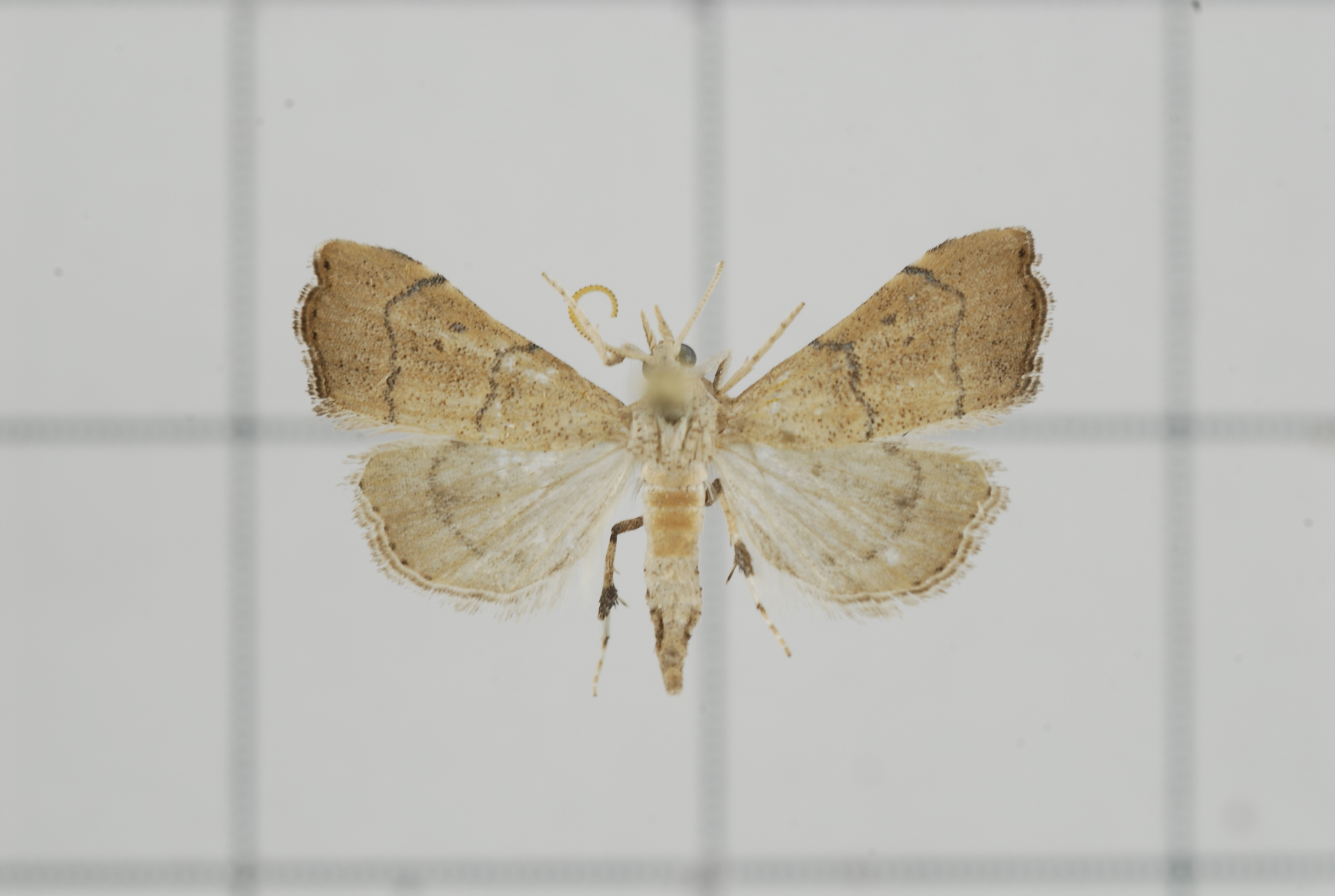
Ptychopseustis Crambidae specimen

Ptychopseustis is a genus of moths of the family Crambidae.

== Species ==
- Ptychopseustis amoenella (Snellen, 1880)
- Ptychopseustis argentisparsalis (Hampson, 1896)
- Ptychopseustis calamochroa (Hampson, 1919)
- Ptychopseustis conisphoralis (Hampson, 1919)
- Ptychopseustis eutacta (Turner, 1908)
- Ptychopseustis fuscivenalis (Hampson, 1896)
- Ptychopseustis ictericalis (Swinhoe, 1886)
- Ptychopseustis impar (Warren & Rothschild, 1905)
- Ptychopseustis lucipara Mey, 2011
- Ptychopseustis molybdogramma (Hampson, 1919)
- Ptychopseustis pallidochrealis Yamanaka, 2004
- Ptychopseustis plumbeolinealis (Hampson, 1896)
- Ptychopseustis schmitzi Mey, 2011
- Ptychopseustis undulalis (Hampson, 1919)
