= Emmalocera laminella =

Scientific classification
- Kingdom: Animalia
- Phylum: Arthropoda
- Class: Insecta
- Order: Lepidoptera
- Family: Pyralidae
- Genus: Emmalocera
- Species: E. laminella

Binomial name
- Emmalocera laminella Hampson, 1901

Species of moth

Emmalocera laminella is a species of snout moth in the genus Emmalocera. It was described by George Hampson in 1901. It is found in South Africa.
