= Procrica agrapha =

Scientific classification
- Kingdom: Animalia
- Phylum: Arthropoda
- Class: Insecta
- Order: Lepidoptera
- Family: Tortricidae
- Genus: Procrica
- Species: P. agrapha

Binomial name
- Procrica agrapha Diakonoff, 1983

Species of moth

Procrica agrapha is a species of moth of the family Tortricidae. It is found on The Comoros in the Indian Ocean.
