= Emmalocera furvimacula =

Scientific classification
- Kingdom: Animalia
- Phylum: Arthropoda
- Class: Insecta
- Order: Lepidoptera
- Family: Pyralidae
- Genus: Emmalocera
- Species: E. furvimacula

Binomial name
- Emmalocera furvimacula (Hampson, 1918)

Synonyms
- Rhinaphe furvimacula Hampson, 1918

Species of moth

Emmalocera furvimacula is a species of snout moth in the genus Emmalocera. It was described by George Hampson in 1918. It is found in Argentina.
