= Parapsectris carinata =

Scientific classification
- Domain: Eukaryota
- Kingdom: Animalia
- Phylum: Arthropoda
- Class: Insecta
- Order: Lepidoptera
- Family: Gelechiidae
- Genus: Parapsectris
- Species: P. carinata

Binomial name
- Parapsectris carinata (Meyrick, 1911)

Synonyms
- Epithectis carinata Meyrick, 1911; Athrips carinata; Epithectis emerita Meyrick, 1921

Species of moth

Parapsectris carinata is a moth in the family Gelechiidae. It was described by Edward Meyrick in 1911. It is found in the South African provinces of Limpopo and Gauteng.

== Characteristics ==
The wingspan is about 10 mm. The forewings are whitish, densely irrorated (sprinkled) with dark fuscous. The stigmata are black, the first discal rather elongate, well marked, the plical rather before the first discal, forming the extremity of a blackish streak along the fold from the base, the second discal represented by two or three scales. There are some undefined blackish dots on the posterior part of the costa and termen. The hindwings are grey.
