= Emmalocera holochra =

Scientific classification
- Domain: Eukaryota
- Kingdom: Animalia
- Phylum: Arthropoda
- Class: Insecta
- Order: Lepidoptera
- Family: Pyralidae
- Genus: Emmalocera
- Species: E. holochra

Binomial name
- Emmalocera holochra (Turner, 1904)

Synonyms
- Poujadia holochra Turner, 1904

Species of moth

Emmalocera holochra is a species of snout moth in the genus Emmalocera. It is found in the Australian state of Western Australia.
