= Emmalocera dimochla =

Scientific classification
- Domain: Eukaryota
- Kingdom: Animalia
- Phylum: Arthropoda
- Class: Insecta
- Order: Lepidoptera
- Family: Pyralidae
- Genus: Emmalocera
- Species: E. dimochla

Binomial name
- Emmalocera dimochla (Turner, 1947)

Synonyms
- Lioprosopa dimochla Turner, 1947

Species of moth

Emmalocera dimochla is a species of snout moth in the genus Emmalocera. It is found in Australia.
