= Bazaria polichomriella =

Scientific classification
- Domain: Eukaryota
- Kingdom: Animalia
- Phylum: Arthropoda
- Class: Insecta
- Order: Lepidoptera
- Family: Pyralidae
- Genus: Bazaria
- Species: B. polichomriella

Binomial name
- Bazaria polichomriella (Amsel, 1970)

Synonyms
- Vixsinusia polichomriella Amsel, 1970

Species of moth

Bazaria polichomriella is a species of snout moth in the genus Bazaria. It was described by Hans Georg Amsel in 1970. It is found in Afghanistan.
