= Emmalocera neotomella =

Scientific classification
- Kingdom: Animalia
- Phylum: Arthropoda
- Class: Insecta
- Order: Lepidoptera
- Family: Pyralidae
- Genus: Emmalocera
- Species: E. neotomella

Binomial name
- Emmalocera neotomella (Meyrick, 1879)

Synonyms
- Eucarphia neotomella Meyrick, 1879

Species of moth

Emmalocera neotomella is a species of snout moth in the genus Emmalocera. It is found in New South Wales, Australia.
