= Choanograptis parorthota =

Scientific classification
- Kingdom: Animalia
- Phylum: Arthropoda
- Class: Insecta
- Order: Lepidoptera
- Family: Tortricidae
- Genus: Choanograptis
- Species: C. parorthota

Binomial name
- Choanograptis parorthota (Meyrick, 1928)

Synonyms
- Capua parorthota Meyrick, 1928

Species of moth

Choanograptis parorthota is a species of moth of the family Tortricidae. It is found on the Bismarck Archipelago off the northeastern coast of New Guinea.
