= Bazaria lixiviella =

Scientific classification
- Domain: Eukaryota
- Kingdom: Animalia
- Phylum: Arthropoda
- Class: Insecta
- Order: Lepidoptera
- Family: Pyralidae
- Genus: Bazaria
- Species: B. lixiviella

Binomial name
- Bazaria lixiviella (Erschoff, 1874)

Synonyms
- Eucarphia lixiviella Erschoff, 1874

Species of moth

Bazaria lixiviella is a species of snout moth in the genus Bazaria. It was described by Nikolay Grigoryevich Erschoff in 1874. It is found in Iran, Pakistan, the Palestinian territories and the United Arab Emirates.
