= Emmalocera castanealis =

Scientific classification
- Kingdom: Animalia
- Phylum: Arthropoda
- Class: Insecta
- Order: Lepidoptera
- Family: Pyralidae
- Genus: Emmalocera
- Species: E. castanealis

Binomial name
- Emmalocera castanealis (Hampson, 1912)

Synonyms
- Rhinaphe castanealis Hampson, 1912

Species of moth

Emmalocera castanealis is a species of snout moth in the genus Emmalocera. It was described by George Hampson in 1912. It is found in Malawi and South Africa.
