= Emmalocera fuscostrigella =

Scientific classification
- Domain: Eukaryota
- Kingdom: Animalia
- Phylum: Arthropoda
- Class: Insecta
- Order: Lepidoptera
- Family: Pyralidae
- Genus: Emmalocera
- Species: E. fuscostrigella

Binomial name
- Emmalocera fuscostrigella (Ragonot, 1888)

Synonyms
- Ambala fuscostrigella Ragonot, 1888

Species of moth

Emmalocera fuscostrigella is a species of snout moth in the genus Emmalocera. It was described by Émile Louis Ragonot in 1888. It is found in India.
