= Procrica camerunica =

Scientific classification
- Kingdom: Animalia
- Phylum: Arthropoda
- Clade: Pancrustacea
- Class: Insecta
- Order: Lepidoptera
- Family: Tortricidae
- Genus: Procrica
- Species: P. camerunica

Binomial name
- Procrica camerunica Razowski, 2002

Synonyms
- Procrica camerunica Razowski, 2002

Species of moth

Procrica camerunica is a species of moth of the family Tortricidae. It is found in Cameroon.
