= Bazaria gilvella =

Scientific classification
- Domain: Eukaryota
- Kingdom: Animalia
- Phylum: Arthropoda
- Class: Insecta
- Order: Lepidoptera
- Family: Pyralidae
- Genus: Bazaria
- Species: B. gilvella

Binomial name
- Bazaria gilvella (Ragonot, 1887)

Synonyms
- Anoristia gilvella Ragonot, 1887

Species of moth

Bazaria gilvella is a species of snout moth in the genus Bazaria. It was described by Émile Louis Ragonot in 1887 and is known from Turkey, Turkmenistan, China, Kazakhstan, Armenia and the Canary Islands.
