= Pseudathrips =

Scientific classification
- Kingdom: Animalia
- Phylum: Arthropoda
- Clade: Pancrustacea
- Class: Insecta
- Order: Lepidoptera
- Family: Gelechiidae
- Subfamily: Gelechiinae
- Genus: Pseudathrips; Povolný, 1986

Genus of moths

Pseudathrips is a genus of moth in the family Gelechiidae.

== Species ==
- Pseudathrips amseli (Povolný, 1981)
- Pseudathrips buettikeri Povolný, 1986
- Pseudathrips similis (Povolný, 1981)
