= Choanograptis =

Scientific classification
- Domain: Eukaryota
- Kingdom: Animalia
- Phylum: Arthropoda
- Class: Insecta
- Order: Lepidoptera
- Family: Tortricidae
- Tribe: Archipini
- Genus: Choanograptis; Meyrick, 1938

Genus of tortrix moths

Choanograptis is a genus of moths belonging to the subfamily Tortricinae of the family Tortricidae.

== Species ==
- Choanograptis ambigua Diakonoff, 1952
- Choanograptis ammina (Diakonoff, 1983)
- Choanograptis argyrocyma Diakonoff, 1953
- Choanograptis concinna Diakonoff, 1952
- Choanograptis concurrens Diakonoff, 1952
- Choanograptis diagrapha Diakonoff, 1953
- Choanograptis diaphora Diakonoff, 1953
- Choanograptis didyma Meyrick, 1938
- Choanograptis dihamma (Diakonoff, 1941)
- Choanograptis fasciata Diakonoff, 1952
- Choanograptis hamuligera Diakonoff, 1953
- Choanograptis paragrapha Diakonoff, 1953
- Choanograptis parorthota (Meyrick, 1928)
- Choanograptis rhabdomaga (Meyrick, 1938)
- Choanograptis tetraulax Diakonoff, 1953

== See also ==
- List of Tortricidae genera
