= Ptychopseustis impar =

Scientific classification
- Kingdom: Animalia
- Phylum: Arthropoda
- Clade: Pancrustacea
- Class: Insecta
- Order: Lepidoptera
- Family: Crambidae
- Genus: Ptychopseustis
- Species: P. impar

Binomial name
- Ptychopseustis impar (Warren & Rothschild, 1905)

Synonyms
- Platytes impar Warren & Rothschild, 1905

Species of moth

Ptychopseustis impar is a moth in the family Crambidae. It is found in Sudan.
