= Emmalocera nigricostalis =

Scientific classification
- Kingdom: Animalia
- Phylum: Arthropoda
- Class: Insecta
- Order: Lepidoptera
- Family: Pyralidae
- Genus: Emmalocera
- Species: E. nigricostalis

Binomial name
- Emmalocera nigricostalis (Walker, 1863)

Synonyms
- Trachonitis nigricostalis Walker, 1863; Rhinaphe nigricostalis; Comorta atricostella Ragonot, 1888

Species of moth

Emmalocera nigricostalis is a species of snout moth (family Pyralidae) in the genus Emmalocera. It was described by Francis Walker in 1863. It is found in western Africa, India, Sri Lanka, Myanmar, Borneo, the Andamans, Fiji and Taiwan.

== Description ==
Its wingspan is about 18 mm. The palpi of the male have the second joint hollowed out to receive the brush-like maxillary palpi. Antennae with a sinus at base of shaft containing a ridge of scales. Palpi upturned. Head and collar fuscous black. Abdomen rufous. Forewings rufous, with a fuscous black costal fascia. There are traces of a medial black line, a discocellular spot, and an oblique postmedial line. A marginal black specks series present. Hindwings whitish, with a slight fuscous tinge and marginal line.
