= Emmalocera euryzona =

Scientific classification
- Kingdom: Animalia
- Phylum: Arthropoda
- Class: Insecta
- Order: Lepidoptera
- Family: Pyralidae
- Genus: Emmalocera
- Species: E. euryzona

Binomial name
- Emmalocera euryzona (Meyrick, 1883)

Synonyms
- Heosphora euryzona Meyrick, 1883

Species of moth

Emmalocera euryzona is a species of snout moth in the genus Emmalocera. It is found in Australia.
