= Bazaria ruscinonella =

Scientific classification
- Domain: Eukaryota
- Kingdom: Animalia
- Phylum: Arthropoda
- Class: Insecta
- Order: Lepidoptera
- Family: Pyralidae
- Genus: Bazaria
- Species: B. ruscinonella

Binomial name
- Bazaria ruscinonella Ragonot, 1888

Synonyms
- Gymnancyla ruscinonella

Species of moth

Bazaria ruscinonella is a species of snout moth in the genus Bazaria. It was described by Émile Louis Ragonot, in 1888. It is found in France, Spain and Portugal.

The species was named in reference to Ruscino, the name of the first city of Perpignan (Pyrénées-Orientales, France) in ancient times, where Ragonot found it for the first time.
