= Emmalocera simplicipalpis =

Scientific classification
- Domain: Eukaryota
- Kingdom: Animalia
- Phylum: Arthropoda
- Class: Insecta
- Order: Lepidoptera
- Family: Pyralidae
- Genus: Emmalocera
- Species: E. simplicipalpis

Binomial name
- Emmalocera simplicipalpis (Strand, 1920)

Synonyms
- Singhaliella simplicipalpis Strand, 1920

Species of moth

Emmalocera simplicipalpis is a species of snout moth in the genus Emmalocera. It was described by Embrik Strand in 1920. It is found in Taiwan.
