= Ptychopseustis fuscivenalis =

Scientific classification
- Kingdom: Animalia
- Phylum: Arthropoda
- Clade: Pancrustacea
- Class: Insecta
- Order: Lepidoptera
- Family: Crambidae
- Genus: Ptychopseustis
- Species: P. fuscivenalis

Binomial name
- Ptychopseustis fuscivenalis (Hampson, 1896)

Synonyms
- Platytes fuscivenalis Hampson, 1896

Species of moth

Ptychopseustis fuscivenalis is a moth in the family Crambidae. It is found in Sri Lanka.

== Description ==
Its wingspan is 18 mm and its color is ochreous. Forewings with veins streaked with brown. An obsolescent bisinuate very oblique leaden-colored antemedial line. Two leaden-colored discocellular specks. A postmedial leaden-colored line very oblique from costa to vein 6, then waved and obsolescent. A marginal dark specks series. Hindwings pale ochreous with dark marginal specks from apex to vein 3.
