= Ptychopseustis conisphoralis =

Scientific classification
- Kingdom: Animalia
- Phylum: Arthropoda
- Clade: Pancrustacea
- Class: Insecta
- Order: Lepidoptera
- Family: Crambidae
- Genus: Ptychopseustis
- Species: P. conisphoralis

Binomial name
- Ptychopseustis conisphoralis (Hampson, 1919)

Synonyms
- Argyria conisphoralis Hampson, 1919

Species of moth

Ptychopseustis conisphoralis is a moth in the family Crambidae. It is found in China (Tianjin).
