= Emmalocera umbricostella =

Scientific classification
- Domain: Eukaryota
- Kingdom: Animalia
- Phylum: Arthropoda
- Class: Insecta
- Order: Lepidoptera
- Family: Pyralidae
- Genus: Emmalocera
- Species: E. umbricostella

Binomial name
- Emmalocera umbricostella Ragonot, 1888

Species of moth

Emmalocera umbricostella is a species of snout moth in the genus Emmalocera. It was described by Ragonot in 1888. It is found in Taiwan, India, Borneo, the Philippines, Java, China and Korea.

The larvae have been recorded on Saccharum officinarum.
