= Ancylodes lapsalis =

Scientific classification
- Kingdom: Animalia
- Phylum: Arthropoda
- Class: Insecta
- Order: Lepidoptera
- Family: Pyralidae
- Genus: Ancylodes
- Species: A. lapsalis

Binomial name
- Ancylodes lapsalis (Walker, 1859)

Synonyms
- Dosara lapsalis Walker, 1859

Species of moth

Ancylodes lapsalis is a species of snout moth in the genus Ancylodes. It was described by Francis Walker in 1859 and is known from Sri Lanka and Australia.
