= Emmalocera phaeostrotella =

Scientific classification
- Kingdom: Animalia
- Phylum: Arthropoda
- Class: Insecta
- Order: Lepidoptera
- Family: Pyralidae
- Genus: Emmalocera
- Species: E. phaeostrotella

Binomial name
- Emmalocera phaeostrotella (Hampson, 1918)

Synonyms
- Rhinaphe phaeostrotella Hampson, 1918

Species of moth

Emmalocera phaeostrotella is a species of snout moth in the genus Emmalocera. It was first described by George Hampson in 1918. It is found in Sri Lanka.
