= Porrittia herzi =

Scientific classification
- Kingdom: Animalia
- Phylum: Arthropoda
- Class: Insecta
- Order: Lepidoptera
- Family: Pterophoridae
- Genus: Porrittia
- Species: P. herzi

Binomial name
- Porrittia herzi Ustjuzhanin, 2001

Species of plume moth

Porrittia herzi is a moth of the family Pterophoridae.
