= Ptychopseustis amoenella =

Scientific classification
- Kingdom: Animalia
- Phylum: Arthropoda
- Clade: Pancrustacea
- Class: Insecta
- Order: Lepidoptera
- Family: Crambidae
- Genus: Ptychopseustis
- Species: P. amoenella

Binomial name
- Ptychopseustis amoenella (Lederer, 1855)

Synonyms
- Diptychophora amoenella Lederer, 1855

Species of moth

Ptychopseustis amoenella is a moth in the family Crambidae. It is found on Sulawesi.
