= Bazaria fulvofasciata =

Scientific classification
- Domain: Eukaryota
- Kingdom: Animalia
- Phylum: Arthropoda
- Class: Insecta
- Order: Lepidoptera
- Family: Pyralidae
- Genus: Bazaria
- Species: B. fulvofasciata

Binomial name
- Bazaria fulvofasciata Rothschild, 1915

Species of moth

Bazaria fulvofasciata is a species of snout moth in the genus Bazaria. It was described by Rothschild in 1915. It is found in Algeria.
