= Emmalocera rhabdota =

Scientific classification
- Kingdom: Animalia
- Phylum: Arthropoda
- Class: Insecta
- Order: Lepidoptera
- Family: Pyralidae
- Genus: Emmalocera
- Species: E. rhabdota

Binomial name
- Emmalocera rhabdota (Turner, 1904)

Synonyms
- Polyocha rhabdota Turner, 1904

Species of moth

Emmalocera rhabdota is a species of snout moth in the genus Emmalocera. It is found in Queensland, Australia.
