= Choanograptis dihamma =

Scientific classification
- Domain: Eukaryota
- Kingdom: Animalia
- Phylum: Arthropoda
- Class: Insecta
- Order: Lepidoptera
- Family: Tortricidae
- Genus: Choanograptis
- Species: C. dihamma

Binomial name
- Choanograptis dihamma (Diakonoff, 1941)

Synonyms
- Catamacta dihamma Diakonoff, 1941

Species of moth

Choanograptis dihamma is a species of moth of the family Tortricidae. It is found on Borneo.
