= Emmalocera phaeoneura =

Scientific classification
- Kingdom: Animalia
- Phylum: Arthropoda
- Class: Insecta
- Order: Lepidoptera
- Family: Pyralidae
- Genus: Emmalocera
- Species: E. phaeoneura

Binomial name
- Emmalocera phaeoneura (Hampson, 1918)

Synonyms
- Critonia phaeoneura Hampson, 1918

Species of moth

Emmalocera phaeoneura is a species of moth of the family Pyralidae. It was described by George Hampson in 1918 and is found in Taiwan.
