= Emmalocera sangirensis =

Scientific classification
- Kingdom: Animalia
- Phylum: Arthropoda
- Class: Insecta
- Order: Lepidoptera
- Family: Pyralidae
- Genus: Emmalocera
- Species: E. sangirensis

Binomial name
- Emmalocera sangirensis (Hampson, 1918)

Synonyms
- Rhinaphe sangirensis Hampson, 1918

Species of moth

Emmalocera sangirensis is a species of snout moth in the genus Emmalocera. It was described by George Hampson in 1918. It is found on Sulawesi.
