= Emmalocera radiatella =

Scientific classification
- Kingdom: Animalia
- Phylum: Arthropoda
- Class: Insecta
- Order: Lepidoptera
- Family: Pyralidae
- Genus: Emmalocera
- Species: E. radiatella

Binomial name
- Emmalocera radiatella Hampson, 1901

Synonyms
- Emmalocera radiatella Hampson, 1901; Polyocha achrosta Turner, 1904

Species of moth

Emmalocera radiatella is a species of snout moth in the genus Emmalocera. It is found in Queensland, Australia.
