= Emmalocera celsella =

Scientific classification
- Kingdom: Animalia
- Phylum: Arthropoda
- Class: Insecta
- Order: Lepidoptera
- Family: Pyralidae
- Genus: Emmalocera
- Species: E. celsella

Binomial name
- Emmalocera celsella (Walker, 1863)

Synonyms
- Araxes celsella Walker, 1863

Species of moth

Emmalocera celsella is a species of snout moth in the genus Emmalocera. It was described by Francis Walker in 1863 and is known from Sri Lanka.
