= Emmalocera macrorrhynca =

Scientific classification
- Domain: Eukaryota
- Kingdom: Animalia
- Phylum: Arthropoda
- Class: Insecta
- Order: Lepidoptera
- Family: Pyralidae
- Genus: Emmalocera
- Species: E. macrorrhynca

Binomial name
- Emmalocera macrorrhynca (Turner, 1923)

Synonyms
- Anerastria macrorrhynca Turner, 1923

Species of moth

Emmalocera macrorrhynca is a species of snout moth in the genus Emmalocera. It is found in Australia.
