= Emmalocera pleurochorda =

Scientific classification
- Domain: Eukaryota
- Kingdom: Animalia
- Phylum: Arthropoda
- Class: Insecta
- Order: Lepidoptera
- Family: Pyralidae
- Genus: Emmalocera
- Species: E. pleurochorda

Binomial name
- Emmalocera pleurochorda (Turner, 1913)

Synonyms
- Anerastria pleurochorda Turner, 1913

Species of moth

Emmalocera pleurochorda is a species of snout moth in the genus Emmalocera. It is found in Australia.
