= Emmalocera leucocinctus =

Scientific classification
- Kingdom: Animalia
- Phylum: Arthropoda
- Class: Insecta
- Order: Lepidoptera
- Family: Pyralidae
- Genus: Emmalocera
- Species: E. leucocinctus

Binomial name
- Emmalocera leucocinctus (Walker, 1863)

Synonyms
- Crambus leucocinctus Walker, 1863; Emmalocera leucocincta; Emmalocera crenatella Ragonot, 1888

Species of moth

Emmalocera leucocinctus is a species of snout moth in the genus Emmalocera. It was described by Francis Walker in 1863 and is known from Borneo, Singapore, the Philippines, Taiwan and Japan.
