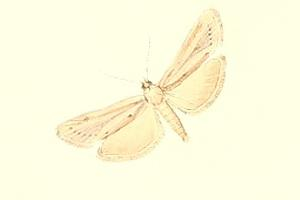

Scientific classification
- Domain: Eukaryota
- Kingdom: Animalia
- Phylum: Arthropoda
- Class: Insecta
- Order: Lepidoptera
- Family: Pyralidae
- Genus: Ancylodes
- Species: A. dealbatella

Binomial name
- Ancylodes dealbatella Erschoff, 1874

Synonyms
- Myelois dealbatella Erschoff, 1874; Epischnia staminella Christoph, 1877; Ancylodes kerbelella Amsel, 1949; Heterographis nervulatella Turati, 1926

= Ancylodes dealbatella =

Species of moth

Ancylodes dealbatella is a species of snout moth in the genus Ancylodes. It was described by Nikolay Grigoryevich Erschoff in 1874 and is known from Turkmenistan, Iraq, Libya, Spain and Russia.

The wingspan is about 17 mm.
