= Emmalocera aurifusellus =

Scientific classification
- Kingdom: Animalia
- Phylum: Arthropoda
- Class: Insecta
- Order: Lepidoptera
- Family: Pyralidae
- Genus: Emmalocera
- Species: E. aurifusellus

Binomial name
- Emmalocera aurifusellus (Walker, 1866)

Synonyms
- Crambus aurifusellus Walker, 1866

Species of moth

Emmalocera aurifusellis is a species of snout moth in the genus Emmalocera. It was described by Francis Walker in 1866 and is known from India.
