= Parapsectris ferulata =

Scientific classification
- Kingdom: Animalia
- Phylum: Arthropoda
- Class: Insecta
- Order: Lepidoptera
- Family: Gelechiidae
- Genus: Parapsectris
- Species: P. ferulata

Binomial name
- Parapsectris ferulata Meyrick, 1918

Species of moth

Parapsectris ferulata is a moth in the family Gelechiidae. It was described by Edward Meyrick in 1918. It is found in South Africa (KwaZulu-Natal).

The wingspan is 13–14 mm. The forewings are fuscous irrorated (sprinkled) with dark fuscous and with a blackish dot at the base of the costa, and one almost at the base above the fold. There is a short very oblique whitish-ochreous streak from the costa at one-fifth, preceded by a small blackish mark. A whitish-ochreous streak is found along the fold from the base to the middle of the wing, with a series of three small blackish marks, the first on the upper edge and the other two on the lower. There is a very oblique whitish-ochreous streak from two-fifths of the costa to two-thirds of the disc, preceded by a series of three or four small blackish marks. There are also three small whitish-ochreous spots or dots on the costa towards the apex, and an undefined streak along the termen, accompanied by a marginal series of small groups of blackish scales. The hindwings are slaty grey.
