= Emmalocera distictella =

Scientific classification
- Kingdom: Animalia
- Phylum: Arthropoda
- Class: Insecta
- Order: Lepidoptera
- Family: Pyralidae
- Genus: Emmalocera
- Species: E. distictella

Binomial name
- Emmalocera distictella (Hampson, 1918)

Synonyms
- Saluria distictella Hampson, 1918

Species of moth

Emmalocera distictella is a species of snout moth in the genus Emmalocera. It is found in Queensland, Australia.
