= Porrittia =

Scientific classification
- Domain: Eukaryota
- Kingdom: Animalia
- Phylum: Arthropoda
- Class: Insecta
- Order: Lepidoptera
- Family: Pterophoridae
- Tribe: Pterophorini
- Genus: Porrittia; Tutt, 1905

Plume moth genus

Porrittia is a genus of moths in the family Pterophoridae.

== Species ==
- Porrittia galactodactyla (Denis & Schiffermüller, 1775)
- Porrittia herzi Ustjuzhanin, 2001
- Porrittia imbecilla (Meyrick, 1925)
