= Emmalocera neesimella =

Scientific classification
- Domain: Eukaryota
- Kingdom: Animalia
- Phylum: Arthropoda
- Class: Insecta
- Order: Lepidoptera
- Family: Pyralidae
- Genus: Emmalocera
- Species: E. neesimella

Binomial name
- Emmalocera neesimella (Ragonot, 1901)

Synonyms
- Enosima neesimella Ragonot, 1901

Species of snout moth

Emmalocera neesimella is a species of snout moth in the genus Emmalocera. It was described by Émile Louis Ragonot in 1901. It is found in Korea and Japan.
