= Emmalocera unitella =

Scientific classification
- Domain: Eukaryota
- Kingdom: Animalia
- Phylum: Arthropoda
- Class: Insecta
- Order: Lepidoptera
- Family: Pyralidae
- Genus: Emmalocera
- Species: E. unitella

Binomial name
- Emmalocera unitella de Joannis, 1927

Species of moth

Emmalocera unitella is a species of snout moth in the genus Emmalocera. It was described by Joseph de Joannis in 1927 and is known from Mozambique.
