= Ancylosis bonhoti =

Scientific classification
- Kingdom: Animalia
- Phylum: Arthropoda
- Class: Insecta
- Order: Lepidoptera
- Family: Pyralidae
- Genus: Ancylosis
- Species: A. bonhoti

Binomial name
- Ancylosis bonhoti Hampson, 1901

Species of moth

Ancylosis bonhoti is a species of snout moth in the genus Ancylosis. It was described by George Hampson in 1901. It is found on the Bahamas.
