= Emmalocera strigicostella =

Scientific classification
- Kingdom: Animalia
- Phylum: Arthropoda
- Clade: Pancrustacea
- Class: Insecta
- Order: Lepidoptera
- Family: Pyralidae
- Genus: Emmalocera
- Species: E. strigicostella

Binomial name
- Emmalocera strigicostella (Hampson, 1896)

Synonyms
- Polyocha strigicostella Hampson, 1896

Species of moth

Emmalocera strigicostella is a species of snout moth in the genus Emmalocera. It was described by George Hampson in 1896. It is found in Saudi Arabia.
