= Porrittia imbecilla =

Scientific classification
- Kingdom: Animalia
- Phylum: Arthropoda
- Class: Insecta
- Order: Lepidoptera
- Family: Pterophoridae
- Genus: Porrittia
- Species: P. imbecilla

Binomial name
- Porrittia imbecilla (Meyrick, 1925)

Synonyms
- Alucita imbecilla Meyrick, 1925

Species of plume moth

Porrittia imbecilla is a moth of the family Pterophoridae. It is known from Egypt, Israel, Saudi Arabia and Yemen.

The larvae feed on Conyza dioscoridis.
