= Coleophora lasloella =

Scientific classification
- Kingdom: Animalia
- Phylum: Arthropoda
- Clade: Pancrustacea
- Class: Insecta
- Order: Lepidoptera
- Family: Coleophoridae
- Genus: Coleophora
- Species: C. lasloella

Binomial name
- Coleophora lasloella Baldizzone, 1982

Species of moth

Coleophora lasloella is a moth of the family Coleophoridae. It is found in Algeria, Tunisia, Saudi Arabia, the United Arab Emirates and Yemen.
