= Pyrausta arabica =

Scientific classification
- Domain: Eukaryota
- Kingdom: Animalia
- Phylum: Arthropoda
- Class: Insecta
- Order: Lepidoptera
- Family: Crambidae
- Genus: Pyrausta
- Species: P. arabica

Binomial name
- Pyrausta arabica (Butler, 1884)

Synonyms
- Ennychia arabica Butler, 1884

Species of moth

Pyrausta arabica is a moth in the family Crambidae. It was described by Arthur Gardiner Butler in 1884. It is found in Yemen.
