= Bazaria pempeliella =

Scientific classification
- Kingdom: Animalia
- Phylum: Arthropoda
- Clade: Pancrustacea
- Class: Insecta
- Order: Lepidoptera
- Family: Pyralidae
- Genus: Bazaria
- Species: B. pempeliella

Binomial name
- Bazaria pempeliella Ragonot, 1893

Species of moth

Bazaria pempeliella is a species of snout moth in the genus Bazaria. It was described by Ragonot, in 1893. It is found in Algeria, Morocco, Tunisia, Egypt, Afghanistan, Jordan, Palestine, Saudi Arabia, Turkmenistan and the United Arab Emirates.
