= Ancylodes pallens =

Scientific classification
- Kingdom: Animalia
- Phylum: Arthropoda
- Class: Insecta
- Order: Lepidoptera
- Family: Pyralidae
- Genus: Ancylodes
- Species: A. pallens

Binomial name
- Ancylodes pallens Ragonot, 1887

Synonyms
- Ancylodes pallens f. fuscella Amsel, 1958; Ancylodes fuscella Amsel, 1958; Christophia lactealis Rothschild, 1915; Ancylodes lactealis (Rothschild, 1915); Myelois banghaasiella Caradja, 1916; Bazaria venosella Asselbergs, 2009; Ancylodes venosella (Asselbergs, 2009)

Species of moth

Ancylodes pallens is a species of snout moth, family Pyralidae. It was described by Émile Louis Ragonot in 1887 and is known from southern Europe, Russia, western Asia (Saudi Arabia, Syria, Iran, Iraq, Afghanistan), North Africa (Algeria), and the Canary Islands. It is a very rare immigrant to southern Great Britain.

The wingspan is 18–20 mm.
