= Ptychopseustis ictericalis =

Scientific classification
- Kingdom: Animalia
- Phylum: Arthropoda
- Clade: Pancrustacea
- Class: Insecta
- Order: Lepidoptera
- Family: Crambidae
- Genus: Ptychopseustis
- Species: P. ictericalis

Binomial name
- Ptychopseustis ictericalis (C. Swinhoe, 1886)

Synonyms
- Scoparia ictericalis C. Swinhoe, 1886

Species of moth

Ptychopseustis ictericalis is a moth in the family Crambidae first described by Charles Swinhoe in 1886. It is found in India and Saudi Arabia.
