= Coleophora viettella =

Scientific classification
- Kingdom: Animalia
- Phylum: Arthropoda
- Class: Insecta
- Order: Lepidoptera
- Family: Coleophoridae
- Genus: Coleophora
- Species: C. viettella

Binomial name
- Coleophora viettella Toll, 1956

Synonyms
- Coleophora arabica Amsel, 1958

Species of moth

Coleophora viettella is a moth of the family Coleophoridae. It is found in Saudi Arabia, the United Arab Emirates and Tunisia.
