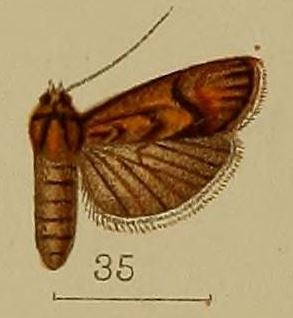

Scientific classification
- Kingdom: Animalia
- Phylum: Arthropoda
- Class: Insecta
- Order: Lepidoptera
- Family: Pyralidae
- Genus: Ancylosis
- Species: A. argentescens

Binomial name
- Ancylosis argentescens (Hampson, 1912)

Synonyms
- Heterographis argentescens Hampson, 1912

= Ancylosis argentescens =

Species of moth

Ancylosis argentescens is a moth of the family Pyralidae. It was described by George Hampson in 1912 and is found in Sri Lanka.
