= Coleophora nurmahal =

Scientific classification
- Kingdom: Animalia
- Phylum: Arthropoda
- Class: Insecta
- Order: Lepidoptera
- Family: Coleophoridae
- Genus: Coleophora
- Species: C. nurmahal

Binomial name
- Coleophora nurmahal Toll, 1957

Species of moth

Coleophora nurmahal is a moth of the family Coleophoridae. It is found in Tunisia, Algeria, Israel, Iran, Saudi Arabia and the United Arab Emirates.

The larvae feed on Hammada corniculata and Hammada salicornica from within the galls of other insects.
