= Talhoukia =

Scientific classification
- Kingdom: Animalia
- Phylum: Arthropoda
- Class: Insecta
- Order: Lepidoptera
- Superfamily: Noctuoidea
- Family: Noctuidae
- Genus: Talhoukia; Wiltshire, 1986
- Species: T. feifae

Binomial name
- Talhoukia feifae Wiltshire, 1986

Genus of moths

Talhoukia is a genus of moths in the family Noctuidae. It contains the single species Talhoukia feifae, which is found in Saudi Arabia.
