= Coleophora ammodyta =

Scientific classification
- Kingdom: Animalia
- Phylum: Arthropoda
- Class: Insecta
- Order: Lepidoptera
- Family: Coleophoridae
- Genus: Coleophora
- Species: C. ammodyta

Binomial name
- Coleophora ammodyta Falkovitsh, 1973

Species of moth

Coleophora ammodyta is a moth of the family Coleophoridae that can be found in Turkestan, Uzbekistan and Saudi Arabia.

The larvae feed on the fruit of Salsola richteri.
