= Choanograptis ammina =

Scientific classification
- Domain: Eukaryota
- Kingdom: Animalia
- Phylum: Arthropoda
- Class: Insecta
- Order: Lepidoptera
- Family: Tortricidae
- Genus: Choanograptis
- Species: C. ammina

Binomial name
- Choanograptis ammina (Diakonoff, 1983)

Synonyms
- Procrica ammina Diakonoff, 1983

Species of moth

Choanograptis ammina is a species of moth of the family Tortricidae. It is found in Saudi Arabia.
