= Pseudathrips similis =

Scientific classification
- Kingdom: Animalia
- Phylum: Arthropoda
- Clade: Pancrustacea
- Class: Insecta
- Order: Lepidoptera
- Family: Gelechiidae
- Genus: Pseudathrips
- Species: P. similis

Binomial name
- Pseudathrips similis (Povolný, 1981)

Synonyms
- Neofriseria similis Povolný, 1981; Parapsectris similis

Species of moth

Pseudathrips similis is a moth in the family Gelechiidae. It was described by Povolný in 1981. It is found in Saudi Arabia.
