= Pseudathrips buettikeri =

Scientific classification
- Kingdom: Animalia
- Phylum: Arthropoda
- Clade: Pancrustacea
- Class: Insecta
- Order: Lepidoptera
- Family: Gelechiidae
- Genus: Pseudathrips
- Species: P. buettikeri

Binomial name
- Pseudathrips buettikeri Povolný, 1986

Synonyms
- Parapsectris buettikeri

Species of moth

Pseudathrips buettikeri is a moth in the family Gelechiidae. It was described by Povolný in 1986. It is found in Saudi Arabia.
