= Pseudathrips amseli =

Scientific classification
- Kingdom: Animalia
- Phylum: Arthropoda
- Clade: Pancrustacea
- Class: Insecta
- Order: Lepidoptera
- Family: Gelechiidae
- Genus: Pseudathrips
- Species: P. amseli

Binomial name
- Pseudathrips amseli (Povolný, 1981)

Synonyms
- Neofriseria amseli Povolný, 1981; Parapsectris amseli

Species of moth

Pseudathrips amseli is a moth in the family Gelechiidae. It was described by Povolný in 1981. It is found in Saudi Arabia and Yemen.
