= List of Lepidoptera of Bahrain =

List of butterfly and moth species in Bahrain

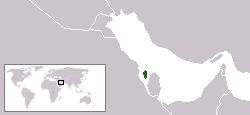
Location of Bahrain

Lepidoptera of Bahrain consist of both the butterflies and moths recorded from Bahrain.

== Butterflies ==
=== Hesperiidae ===
- Pelopidas thrax (Hübner, 1821)

=== Lycaenidae ===
- Brephidium exilis (Boisduval, 1852)
- Chilades parrhasius (Fabricius, 1793)
- Freyeria trochylus (Freyer, 1845)
- Lampides boeticus (Linnaeus, 1767)
- Luthrodes galba (Lederer, 1855)
- Tarucus rosacea Austaut, 1885
- Zizeeria knysna (Trimen, 1862)

=== Nymphalidae ===
- Danaus chrysippus (Linnaeus, 1758)
- Junonia orithya (Linnaeus, 1758)
- Vanessa cardui (Linnaeus, 1758)

=== Papilionidae ===
- Papilio demoleus Linnaeus, 1758

=== Pieridae ===
- Catopsilia florella (Fabricius, 1775)
- Colias croceus (Geoffroy, 1785)
- Colotis fausta (Olivier, 1804)

== Moths ==
=== Arctiidae ===
- Utetheisa pulchella (Linnaeus, 1758)

=== Autostichidae ===
- Heringita amselina (Gozmány, 1967)
- Turatia psameticella (Rebel, 1914)

=== Cossidae ===
- Eremocossus vaulogeri (Staudinger, 1897)
- Holcocerus gloriosus (Erschoff, 1874)
- Wiltshirocossus aries cheesmani (Tams, 1925)

=== Crambidae ===
- Amselia heringi (Amsel, 1935)
- Ancylolomia micropalpella Amsel, 1951
- Nomophila noctuella ([Denis & Schiffermüller], 1775)
- Pediasia numidellus (Rebel, 1903)
- Prionapteryx soudanensis (Hampson, 1919)

=== Ethmiidae ===
- Ethmia quadrinotella (Mann, 1861)

=== Geometridae ===
- Casilda antophilaria (Hübner, 1813)
- Eupithecia tenellata Dietze, 1908
- Idaea granulosa (Warren & Rothschild, 1905)
- Idaea illustris (Brandt, 1941)
- Idaea mimetes (Brandt, 1941)
- Jordanisca tenuisaria Staudinger, 1900
- Microloxia herbaria (Hübner, 1813)
- Neromia pulvereisparsa (Hampson, 1896)
- Phaiogramma discessa (Walker, 1861)
- Pingasa lahayei (Oberthür, 1887)
- Pseudosterrha rufistrigata (Hampson, 1896)
- Rhodometra sacraria Linnaeus, 1767
- Scopula adelpharia (Püngeler, 1894)
- Scopula minorata ochroleucaria (Herrich-Schäffer, 1851)
- Semiothisa syriacaria Staudinger, 1871
- Tephrina perviaria Lederer, 1855
- Traminda mundissima (Walker, 1861)
- Zygophyxia relictata (Walker, 1866)

=== Lasiocampidae ===
- Streblote siva (Lefèbvre, 1827)

=== Lymantriidae ===
- Euproctis cervina (Moore, 1877)

=== Noctuidae ===
- Acantholipes circumdata Walker, 1858
- Agrotis herzogi Rebel, 1911
- Agrotis ipsilon (Hufnagel, 1766)
- Agrotis lasserrei (Oberthür, 1881)
- Agrotis margelanoides (Boursin, 1944)
- Agrotis sardzeana Brandt, 1941
- Agrotis spinifera Hübner, 1808
- Anumeta spilota Ershov, 1874
- Anumeta straminea (Bang-Haas, 1906)
- Aucha polyphaenoides (Wiltshire, 1961)
- Caradrina ingrata Staudinger, 1897
- Cardepia sociabilis (Graslin, 1850)
- Catamecia minima (Swinhoe, 1889)
- Cerocala sana Staudinger, 1901
- Cleonymia chabordis (Oberthür, 1876)
- Clytie infrequens (Swinhoe, 1884)
- Condica illecta (Walker, 1865)
- Condica viscosa (Freyer, 1831)
- Drasteria yerburyi (Butler, 1892)
- Dysgonia torrida (Guenée, 1852)
- Earias insulana (Boisduval, 1833)
- Eublemma bistellata Wiltshire, 1961
- Eublemma bulla Swinhoe, 1884
- Eublemma cochylioides (Guenée, 1852)
- Eublemma gayneri (Rothschild, 1901)
- Eublemma pallidula Herrich-Schäffer, 1856
- Eublemma parva (Hübner, 1808)
- Eublemma rushi Wiltshire, 1961
- Eublemma siticuosa (Lederer, 1858)
- Eublemma straminea Staudinger, 1891
- Garella nilotica (Rogenhofer, 1881)
- Gnamptonyx innexa (Walker, 1858)
- Heliothis albida (Hampson, 1905)
- Heliothis nubigera (Herrich-Schäffer, 1851)
- Heliothis peltigera (Denis & Schiffermüller, 1775)
- Heteropalpia acrosticta (Püngeler, 1904)
- Heteropalpia profesta (Christoph, 1887)
- Heteropalpia vetusta (Walker, 1865)
- Hypena abyssinialis Guenée, 1854
- Metopoceras kneuckeri (Rebel, 1903)
- Mocis frugalis (Fabricius, 1775)
- Mythimna brandti Boursin, 1963
- Pandesma anysa Guenée, 1852
- Rhynchodontodes revolutalis Zeller, 1852
- Rivula sericealis (Scopoli, 1763)
- Scythocentropus inquinata (Mabille, 1888)
- Spodoptera cilium Guenée, 1852
- Spodoptera exigua (Hübner, 1808)
- Spodoptera litura (Fabricius, 1775)
- Spodoptera mauritia (Boisduval, 1833)
- Thiacidas postica Walker, 1855
- Thysanoplusia daubei Boisduval, 1840
- Trichoplusia ni (Hübner, 1800-1803)
- Zekelita ravalis (Herrich-Schäffer, 1851)

=== Nolidae ===
- Nola harouni (Wiltshire, 1951)

=== Pterophoridae ===
- Agdistis adenensis Amsel, 1961
- Agdistis arabica Amsel, 1958
- Agdistis hakimah Arenberger, 1985
- Agdistis nanodes Meyrick, 1906
- Agdistis olei Arenberger, 1976
- Agdistis tamaricis (Zeller, 1847)
- Agdistis tenera Arenberger, 1976
- Pterophorus ischnodactyla (Treitschke, 1833)

=== Pyralidae ===
- Ancylosis aspilatella (Ragonot, 1887)
- Ancylosis costistrigella (Ragonot, 1890)
- Ancylosis faustinella (Zeller, 1867)

=== Sphingidae ===
- Agrius convolvuli (Linnaeus, 1758)
- Daphnis nerii (Linnaeus, 1758)
- Macroglossum stellatarum (Linnaeus, 1758)
- Hyles lineata (Fabricius, 1775)

=== Tortricidae ===
- Trachysmia jerichoana (Amsel, 1935)
