= Agdistis sabokyi =

Scientific classification
- Kingdom: Animalia
- Phylum: Arthropoda
- Class: Insecta
- Order: Lepidoptera
- Family: Pterophoridae
- Genus: Agdistis
- Species: A. sabokyi

Binomial name
- Agdistis sabokyi Fazekas, 2000

Species of plume moth

Agdistis sabokyi is a moth of the family Pterophoridae, first described by the Hungarian entomologist Imre Fazekas in 2000. It is known only from its type locality in the Lake Tuz area of Ankara Province, Turkey, where it inhabits heavily grazed short-grass steppe environments on volcanic rock substrates at about 1000 metres elevation. The adult male has a wingspan of about 25 mm, with dark brown-greyish forewings marked by three brown dots along the costa and light brown-greyish hindwings. Taxonomically, it belongs to the "vaderina species-group" centred in the Syrian/Iranian refuge area, with its evolutionary origin likely in the Ponto-Caspian region.

== Taxonomy ==
Agdistis sabokyi belongs to the genus Agdistis within the subfamily Agdistinae of the family Pterophoridae (plume moths). It was formally described as a new species by the Hungarian entomologist Imre Fazekas in 2000. The species name sabokyi is derived from the surname of its collector, Csaba Szabóky. As noted in the original description, the letter "sz" used in Hungarian names is equivalent to Latin "s", hence the Latinised variation "sabokyi" rather than "szabokyi".

Taxonomically, A. sabokyi belongs to the "vaderina species-group", which is centred in the Syrian/Iranian refuge area. Within this group, A. sabokyi shares phylogenetic relationships with several other Agdistis species, including Atlantic-Mediterranean species (A. pseudocantenerisis), and others including A. asiatica, A. heydeni, A. tamaricis, and A. caradjai.

The original description notes that the male genitalia of species within this group are highly heterogeneous, yet A. sabokyi shows close morphological relationships to other members, particularly in the A. maliasicus-caradjai-sabokyi subgroup, based on similarities of the genitalia structures. The holotype specimen (a male) is deposited in the Natural History Collection at Komló, Hungary.

== Description ==
The adult male has a wingspan of about 25 mm. Its forewings display a ground colour of dark brown-greyish, marked with three brown dots along the costa (front edge of the wing). The edge of the costa features white colouration between the second and third dots. The upper edge area is darker while the lower areas appear lighter in colour. The forewings also show a scattering of white and brown scales. The base of the wing fringe is white, with the outer portion light brown.

The hindwings are light brown-greyish, matching the central area of the forewings, but showing darker brown colouration at the ends of the nervures (wing veins). The frons (front part of the head between the eyes) is weakly cone-shaped and brown in colour.

== Habitat and distribution ==
Agdistis sabokyi inhabits a specific ecological niche consisting of heavily grazed short-grass steppe environments primarily found on volcanic rock substrates. Within these habitats, vegetation is sparse and dominated by Artemisia (wormwood), Amygdalus (wild almond), and Stipa species that grow sporadically throughout the landscape. This moth species appears adapted to the harsh conditions of these open, exposed environments that experience significant grazing pressure. The species has been documented at roughly 1000 metres above sea level, suggesting a preference for mid-elevation habitats in mountainous regions.

Agdistis sabokyi has an extremely limited known distribution. It has only been documented from its type locality in the Lake Tuz area of Ankara Province in Turkey. Tuz Gölü, also known as Salt Lake, is the second-largest lake in Turkey and creates a distinctive ecological zone in central Anatolia. The moth was specifically collected 9 km north of Şereflikoçhisar, a district in the southeastern part of Ankara Province.

The species belongs to the "vaderina species-group" which is primarily distributed throughout the Syrian/Iranian biogeographical region. Based on taxonomic analysis and the distribution of related species, researchers believe that the gene-centre (area of evolutionary origin) for this species group, including A. sabokyi, is likely to be the Ponto-Caspian area—the region surrounding the Black Sea and Caspian Sea. This suggests that while currently only known from a single location in Turkey, the species may potentially be found in other similar habitats throughout parts of Western Asia that share comparable ecological characteristics. The genus Agdistis is particularly species-rich in the Western Palaearctic region, especially in Turkey.
