= Ornativalva plutelliformis =

- Specimen from Donetsk, Ukraine

Scientific classification
- Kingdom: Animalia
- Phylum: Arthropoda
- Class: Insecta
- Order: Lepidoptera
- Family: Gelechiidae
- Genus: Ornativalva
- Species: O. plutelliformis

Binomial name
- Ornativalva plutelliformis (Staudinger, 1859)

Synonyms
- Gelechia plutelliformis Staudinger, 1859; Alucita olbiaella Millière, [1861]; Hypsolophus siewersiellus Christoph, 1867; Gelechia sinuatella Walsingham, 1904

Species of moth

Ornativalva plutelliformis is a moth of the family Gelechiidae. It was described by Staudinger in 1859. It is found from southern Europe and North Africa east to western Asia (including Turkmenistan and the United Arab Emirates) and China (Xinjiang).

The wingspan is 18–20 mm. The forewings are pale ochreous, with a more or less pronounced rosy tinge, finely dusted with brownish scales and with a long dark tawny brownish fuscous streak runs from near the base to a point half-way beyond the end of the cell and the apex. Near its narrow base it sends out a slight angle across the fold, and following the fold is gradually dilated to a little before the middle, then narrowing again, with its lower margin somewhat sinuate, it curves downward to the end of the cell throwing out then a narrow projection towards the apex. A few obscure spots around the apex and termen precede the whitish ochreous cilia which are thickly sprinkled with brownish atoms. The hindwings are brownish grey.

The larvae feed on Tamarix species, including Tamarix gallica, Tamarix laxa, Tamarix pallasii, Tamarix canariensis, Tamarix africana and Tamarix parviflora.
