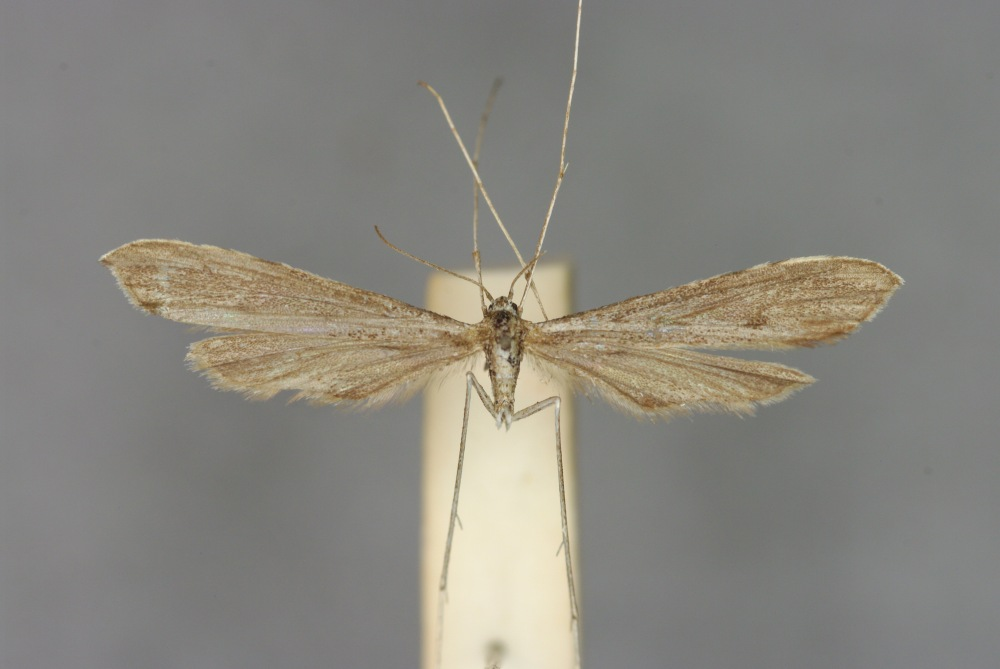

Scientific classification
- Kingdom: Animalia
- Phylum: Arthropoda
- Clade: Pancrustacea
- Class: Insecta
- Order: Lepidoptera
- Family: Pterophoridae
- Genus: Agdistis
- Species: A. adactyla

Binomial name
- Agdistis adactyla (Hübner, [1823]), or (Hübner, [1819])

Synonyms
- Alucita adactyla Hübner, 1819; Adactyla huebneri Zeller, 1841

= Agdistis adactyla =

Species of plume moth

Agdistis adactyla is a moth species in the family Pterophoridae, and the type species of genus Agdistis. It is known from most of the Palearctic realm, where it occurs from central and south-western Europe and North Africa to eastern Asia.

== Distribution ==
The species is known from Europe, North Africa and Asia, with a type locality in Austria.

Within Europe, the species occurs from southern France and northern Germany eastwards. A single record from the Netherlands, 250 km from its nearest known locality, has been deemed an incidental introduction. In Africa, the species is known from Morocco, Algeria, Tunisia, Libya and Jordan. In Asia, the species has been recorded from Russia, Israel, Turkey, Armenia, Iran, Afghanistan, Kazachstan, Tajikistan, Turkmenistan, Mongolia and China.

== Appearance ==
As with other species in Agdistis, and unlike the rest of the Pterophoridae, the wings of Agdistis adactyla are whole rather than cleft. The wingspan is 20–26 mm.

Specimens found in steppe habitats are brighter and larger than those in saline areas.

== Behaviour and habitat ==
The larvae feed on Artemisia campestris, Artemisia scoparia, Chenopodium fruticosum, Erica cinerea and Santolina chamaecyparissus, and may be detritivorous. In Germany, larvae can be found until June.

In Central Europe, the adults are on wing in a single generation, which in Germany occurs in June and July. In southern parts of its range, the species may have multiple generations. Adults are attracted to light.
