= Agdistis morini =

Scientific classification
- Kingdom: Animalia
- Phylum: Arthropoda
- Clade: Pancrustacea
- Class: Insecta
- Order: Lepidoptera
- Family: Pterophoridae
- Genus: Agdistis
- Species: A. morini

Binomial name
- Agdistis morini Huemer, 2001

Species of plume moth

Agdistis morini is a moth in the family Pterophoridae that is endemic to Italy.
