= Agdistis flavissima =

Scientific classification
- Kingdom: Animalia
- Phylum: Arthropoda
- Class: Insecta
- Order: Lepidoptera
- Family: Pterophoridae
- Genus: Agdistis
- Species: A. flavissima

Binomial name
- Agdistis flavissima Caradja, 1920

Species of plume moth

Agdistis flavissima is a moth in the family Pterophoridae. It is known to occur in China (Xinjiang), Turkmenistan, Tajikistan, Uzbekistan, Kazakhstan and European Russia.

== Appearance and behaviour ==
Agdistis flavissima often occurs in the same locations as Agdistis ingens, which it resembles in outward appearance but not genitals. It is a large plume moth.
