= Agdistis asthenes =

Scientific classification
- Kingdom: Animalia
- Phylum: Arthropoda
- Clade: Pancrustacea
- Class: Insecta
- Order: Lepidoptera
- Family: Pterophoridae
- Genus: Agdistis
- Species: A. asthenes

Binomial name
- Agdistis asthenes Bigot, 1970

Species of plume moth

Agdistis asthenes is a moth in the family Pterophoridae. It is known from Mongolia and Kazakhstan.

The wingspan is about 20 mm. The forewings are bright grey and the hindwings are grey.
