= Agdistis symmetrica =

Scientific classification
- Domain: Eukaryota
- Kingdom: Animalia
- Phylum: Arthropoda
- Class: Insecta
- Order: Lepidoptera
- Family: Pterophoridae
- Genus: Agdistis
- Species: A. symmetrica

Binomial name
- Agdistis symmetrica Amsel, 1955

Species of plume moth

Agdistis symmetrica is a moth belonging to the family Pterophoridae. It is found in Malta and Tunisia.

This moth has a wingspan of approximately 20 mm.
