= Agdistis pseudocanariensis =

Scientific classification
- Kingdom: Animalia
- Phylum: Arthropoda
- Class: Insecta
- Order: Lepidoptera
- Family: Pterophoridae
- Genus: Agdistis
- Species: A. pseudocanariensis

Binomial name
- Agdistis pseudocanariensis Arenberger, 1973

Species of plume moth

Agdistis pseudocanariensis is a moth in the family Pterophoridae. It is known from Spain and the Canary Islands.

The wingspan is 14–17 mm. The forewings are grey.
