= Agdistis cathae =

Scientific classification
- Kingdom: Animalia
- Phylum: Arthropoda
- Class: Insecta
- Order: Lepidoptera
- Family: Pterophoridae
- Genus: Agdistis
- Species: A. cathae

Binomial name
- Agdistis cathae Arenberger, 1999

Species of plume moth

Agdistis cathae is a moth in the family Pterophoridae. It is known from Yemen.
