= Anumeta arabiae =

Scientific classification
- Kingdom: Animalia
- Phylum: Arthropoda
- Class: Insecta
- Order: Lepidoptera
- Superfamily: Noctuoidea
- Family: Erebidae
- Genus: Anumeta
- Species: A. arabiae

Binomial name
- Anumeta arabiae Wiltshire, 1961

Species of moth

Anumeta arabiae is a moth of the family Erebidae first described by Wiltshire in 1961. It is found in Saudi Arabia, Jordan and Israel.

There are probably two generations per year. Adults are on wing from January to February and April.
