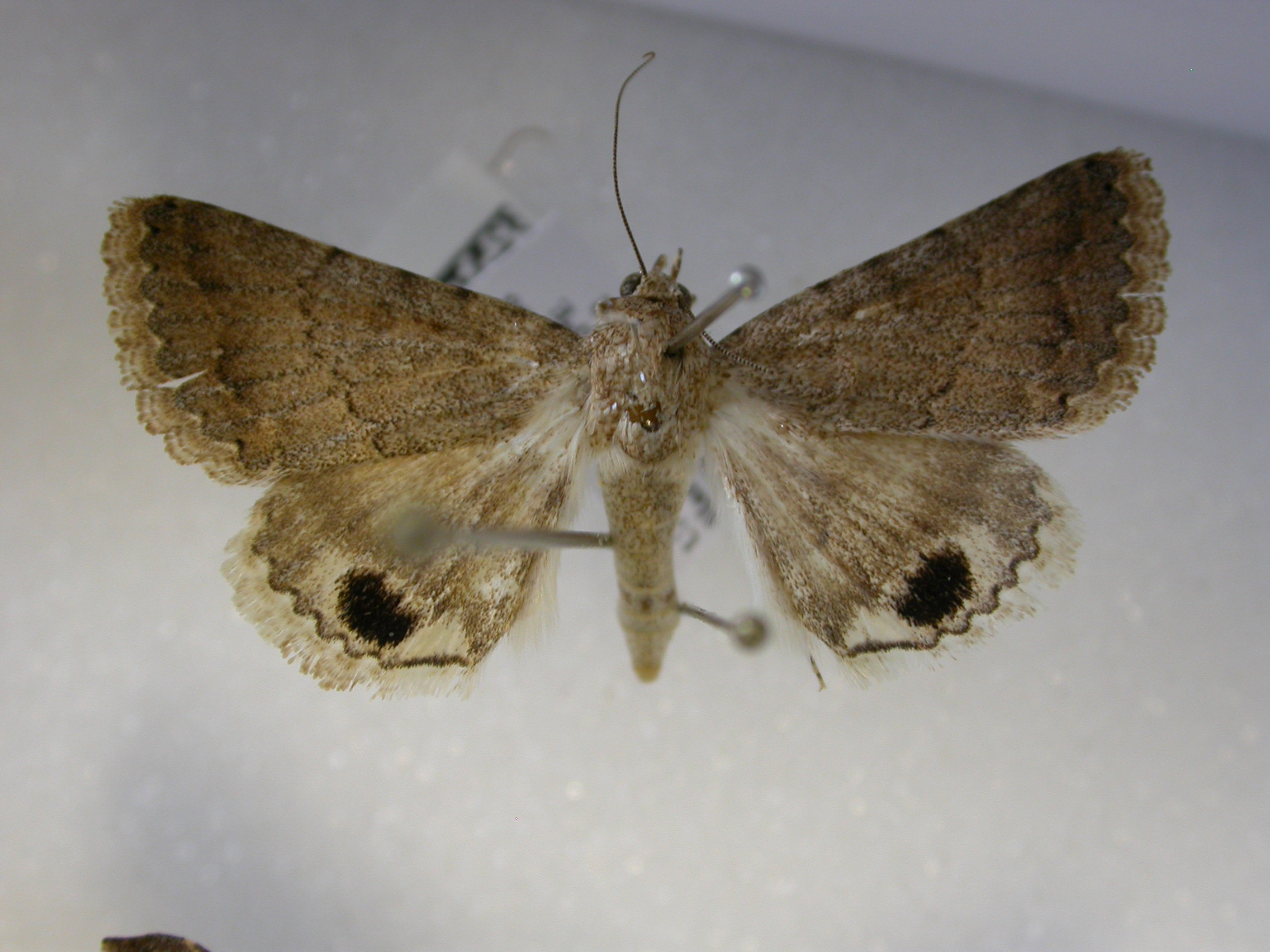

Scientific classification
- Kingdom: Animalia
- Phylum: Arthropoda
- Class: Insecta
- Order: Lepidoptera
- Superfamily: Noctuoidea
- Family: Erebidae
- Genus: Anumeta
- Species: A. atrosignata

Binomial name
- Anumeta atrosignata (Walker, 1858)

= Anumeta atrosignata =

Species of moth

Anumeta atrosignata is a moth of the family Erebidae first described by Francis Walker in 1858. It is found in the Arabian Desert, the Sinai, Israel, east to north-western India.

There are probably two generations per year. Adults are on wing from March to July.

The larvae feed on the Calligonum species.
