= Agdistis hartigi =

Scientific classification
- Kingdom: Animalia
- Phylum: Arthropoda
- Class: Insecta
- Order: Lepidoptera
- Family: Pterophoridae
- Genus: Agdistis
- Species: A. hartigi

Binomial name
- Agdistis hartigi Arenberger, 1973

Species of plume moth

Agdistis hartigi is a moth in the family Pterophoridae. It is known from southern Spain, Italy (Sardinia and Sicily), Greece and Tunisia.

The wingspan is about 17 mm.

Adults are on wing from June to July and from September to October.
