= Agdistis insidiatrix =

Scientific classification
- Kingdom: Animalia
- Phylum: Arthropoda
- Class: Insecta
- Order: Lepidoptera
- Family: Pterophoridae
- Genus: Agdistis
- Species: A. insidiatrix

Binomial name
- Agdistis insidiatrix Meyrick, 1933

Species of plume moth

Agdistis insidiatrix is a moth in the family Pterophoridae. It is known from Yemen (Socotra) and Iran.
