= Agdistis sanctaehelenae =

Scientific classification
- Domain: Eukaryota
- Kingdom: Animalia
- Phylum: Arthropoda
- Class: Insecta
- Order: Lepidoptera
- Family: Pterophoridae
- Genus: Agdistis
- Species: A. sanctaehelenae

Binomial name
- Agdistis sanctaehelenae (E. Wollaston, 1879)

Synonyms
- Adactyla sanctae helenae E. Wollaston, 1879

Species of plume moth

Agdistis sanctaehelenae is a moth in the family Pterophoridae. It was described by Edith Wollaston in 1879 and is known from Saint Helena in the South Atlantic.
