= Agdistis mevlaniella =

Scientific classification
- Kingdom: Animalia
- Phylum: Arthropoda
- Class: Insecta
- Order: Lepidoptera
- Family: Pterophoridae
- Genus: Agdistis
- Species: A. mevlaniella

Binomial name
- Agdistis mevlaniella Arenberger, 1972

Species of plume moth

Agdistis mevlaniella is a moth in the family Pterophoridae. It is known from Anatolia.

The wingspan is 20–22 mm. The forewings are bright greyish-brown and the hindwings are grey-brown.
