= Agdistis takamukui =

Scientific classification
- Domain: Eukaryota
- Kingdom: Animalia
- Phylum: Arthropoda
- Class: Insecta
- Order: Lepidoptera
- Family: Pterophoridae
- Genus: Agdistis
- Species: A. takamukui

Binomial name
- Agdistis takamukui Nohira, 1919

Species of plume moth

Agdistis takamukui is a moth of the family Pterophoridae. It is found on Kyushu island in Japan.
