= Agdistis protecta =

Scientific classification
- Kingdom: Animalia
- Phylum: Arthropoda
- Class: Insecta
- Order: Lepidoptera
- Family: Pterophoridae
- Genus: Agdistis
- Species: A. protecta

Binomial name
- Agdistis protecta Arenberger, 1999

Species of plume moth

Agdistis protecta is a moth in the family Pterophoridae. It is known from Turkmenistan and Iran.

The wingspan is 15–17 mm.
