= Agdistis darwini =

Scientific classification
- Kingdom: Animalia
- Phylum: Arthropoda
- Clade: Pancrustacea
- Class: Insecta
- Order: Lepidoptera
- Family: Pterophoridae
- Genus: Agdistis
- Species: A. darwini

Binomial name
- Agdistis darwini Arenberger, 2009

Species of plume moth

Agdistis darwini is a moth in the family Pterophoridae. It is known from South Africa.
