= Agdistis sissia =

Scientific classification
- Kingdom: Animalia
- Phylum: Arthropoda
- Class: Insecta
- Order: Lepidoptera
- Family: Pterophoridae
- Genus: Agdistis
- Species: A. sissia

Binomial name
- Agdistis sissia Arenberger, 1987

Species of plume moth

Agdistis sissia is a moth in the family Pterophoridae. It is known from Turkey, Armenia, Turkmenistan, Azerbaijan, Iran, and Georgia.
