= Agdistis obstinata =

Scientific classification
- Kingdom: Animalia
- Phylum: Arthropoda
- Class: Insecta
- Order: Lepidoptera
- Family: Pterophoridae
- Genus: Agdistis
- Species: A. obstinata

Binomial name
- Agdistis obstinata Meyrick, 1920

Species of plume moth

Agdistis obstinata is a moth in the family Pterophoridae. It is known from South Africa, Kenya, Tanzania, Uganda, Saudi Arabia, Yemen and Ethiopia.
