= Agdistis satanas =

Scientific classification
- Domain: Eukaryota
- Kingdom: Animalia
- Phylum: Arthropoda
- Class: Insecta
- Order: Lepidoptera
- Family: Pterophoridae
- Genus: Agdistis
- Species: A. satanas

Binomial name
- Agdistis satanas Millière, 1875

Synonyms
- Agdistis nanus Turati, 1924; Agdistis pseudosatanas Amsel, 1951

Species of plume moth

Agdistis satanas is a moth in the family Pterophoridae. It is known from the Balearic Islands, Portugal, Spain, France, Corsica, Italy (Piedmont, Val d'Aosta, Latium, Apulia, Sardinia, Sicily), Malta, Germany, Albania, Romania, Bulgaria, Greece, Crete, Turkey, Israel, Algeria, Tunisia, Libya and Morocco.

The wingspan is about 20 mm (0.8 in). Adults are on wing from April to September.

The larvae feed on Scabiosa candicans, Scabiosa pyrenaica, Scleranthus species and Limoniastrum monopetalum.
