= Agdistis chardzhouna =

Scientific classification
- Kingdom: Animalia
- Phylum: Arthropoda
- Class: Insecta
- Order: Lepidoptera
- Family: Pterophoridae
- Genus: Agdistis
- Species: A. chardzhouna

Binomial name
- Agdistis chardzhouna Arenberger, 1997

Species of plume moth

Agdistis chardzhouna is a moth of the family Pterophoridae. It is found in Turkmenistan.

The wingspan is about 35 mm. The forewings and hindwings are grey. Adults have been recorded in May.
