= Agdistis hulli =

Scientific classification
- Kingdom: Animalia
- Phylum: Arthropoda
- Class: Insecta
- Order: Lepidoptera
- Family: Pterophoridae
- Genus: Agdistis
- Species: A. hulli

Binomial name
- Agdistis hulli Gielis, 1998

Species of plume moth

Agdistis hulli is a moth in the family Pterophoridae. It is known from Greece (Dodecanese Islands, Aegean Islands). It was described from Lesbos.
