= Agdistis tihamae =

Scientific classification
- Kingdom: Animalia
- Phylum: Arthropoda
- Class: Insecta
- Order: Lepidoptera
- Family: Pterophoridae
- Genus: Agdistis
- Species: A. tihamae

Binomial name
- Agdistis tihamae Arenberger, 1999

Species of plume moth

Agdistis tihamae is a moth in the family Pterophoridae. It is known from Yemen.
