= Agdistis uncirectangula =

Scientific classification
- Domain: Eukaryota
- Kingdom: Animalia
- Phylum: Arthropoda
- Class: Insecta
- Order: Lepidoptera
- Family: Pterophoridae
- Genus: Agdistis
- Species: A. uncirectangula

Binomial name
- Agdistis uncirectangula Hao & Li, 2003

Species of plume moth

Agdistis uncirectangula is a moth in the family Pterophoridae. It is known from Ningxia, China.

The wingspan is 25–26 mm.
