= Agdistis korana =

Scientific classification
- Kingdom: Animalia
- Phylum: Arthropoda
- Class: Insecta
- Order: Lepidoptera
- Family: Pterophoridae
- Genus: Agdistis
- Species: A. korana

Binomial name
- Agdistis korana Arenberger, 1988

Species of plume moth

Agdistis korana is a moth in the family Pterophoridae. It is known from Kenya.
