= Anumeta =

Scientific classification
- Kingdom: Animalia
- Phylum: Arthropoda
- Class: Insecta
- Order: Lepidoptera
- Superfamily: Noctuoidea
- Family: Erebidae
- Subfamily: Toxocampinae
- Genus: Anumeta; Walker, 1858

Synonyms
- Eremonoma Warren, 1913; Imitator Alpheraky, 1883; Palpangula Staudinger, 1877

Genus of moths

Anumeta is a genus of moths in the family Erebidae.

== Species ==
- Anumeta arax Fibiger, 1995
- Anumeta arabiae Wiltshire, 1961
- Anumeta arenosa Brandt, 1939
- Anumeta asiatica Wiltshire, 1961
- Anumeta atrosignata Walker, 1858
- Anumeta azelikoula Dumont, 1920
- Anumeta cashmiriensis (Hampson, 1894)
- Anumeta cestina (Staudinger, 1884)
- Anumeta cestis (Ménétriés, 1848)
- Anumeta ciliaria (Ménétriés, 1849)
- Anumeta comosa Dumont, 1920
- Anumeta dentistrigata (Staudinger, 1877)
- Anumeta eberti Wiltshire, 1961
- Anumeta fractistrigata (Alphéraky, 1882)
- Anumeta fricta (Christoph, 1893)
- Anumeta henkei (Staudinger, 1877)
- Anumeta hilgerti (Rothschild, 1909)
- Anumeta major Rothschild, 1913
- Anumeta palpangularis (Püngeler, 1901)
- Anumeta quatuor Berio, 1934
- Anumeta sabulosa Rothschild, 1913
- Anumeta spatzi Rothschild, 1915
- Anumeta spilota (Erschoff, 1874)
- Anumeta straminea (Bang-Haas, 1906)
- Anumeta surcoufi Dumont, 1920
- Anumeta zaza Wiltshire, 1961
