= Agdistis karabachica =

Scientific classification
- Kingdom: Animalia
- Phylum: Arthropoda
- Clade: Pancrustacea
- Class: Insecta
- Order: Lepidoptera
- Family: Pterophoridae
- Genus: Agdistis
- Species: A. karabachica

Binomial name
- Agdistis karabachica Zagulajev, 1990

Species of plume moth

Agdistis karabachica is a moth of the family Pterophoridae. It is found in Turkmenistan, Georgia, Azerbaijan and Turkey.
