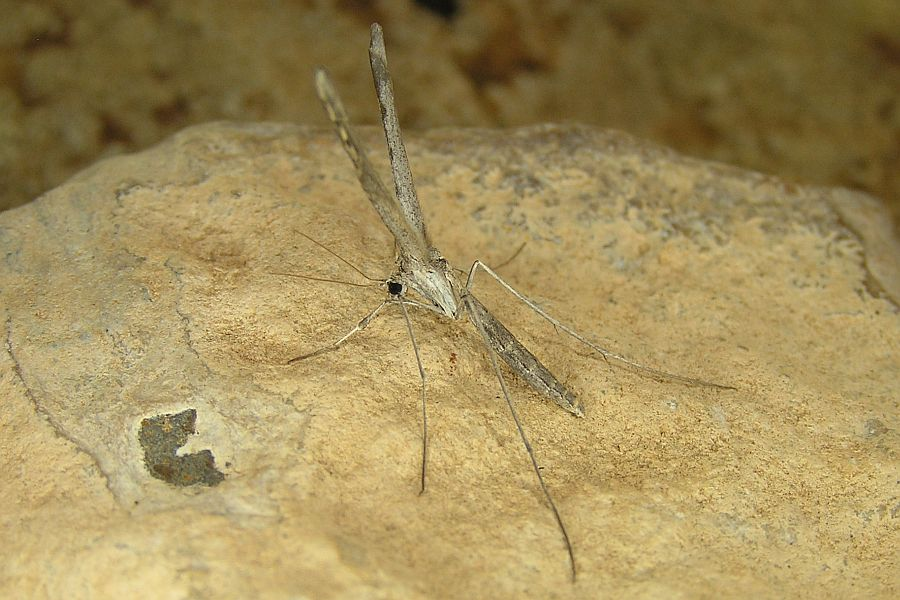

Scientific classification
- Kingdom: Animalia
- Phylum: Arthropoda
- Clade: Pancrustacea
- Class: Insecta
- Order: Lepidoptera
- Family: Pterophoridae
- Genus: Agdistis
- Species: A. bifurcatus

Binomial name
- Agdistis bifurcatus Agenjo, 1952

= Agdistis bifurcatus =

Species of plume moth

Agdistis bifurcatus is a moth in the family Pterophoridae. It is known from Cape Verde, the Canary Islands, Morocco, Tunisia, the Selvagens Islands, Spain and Portugal.

The larvae feed on Limonium species, including Limonium ferulaceum.
