= Anumeta hilgerti =

Scientific classification
- Domain: Eukaryota
- Kingdom: Animalia
- Phylum: Arthropoda
- Class: Insecta
- Order: Lepidoptera
- Superfamily: Noctuoidea
- Family: Erebidae
- Genus: Anumeta
- Species: A. hilgerti

Binomial name
- Anumeta hilgerti Rothschild, 1909

Species of moth

Anumeta hilgerti is a moth of the family Noctuidae first described by Rothschild in 1909. It is found from Morocco to the Arabian Peninsula.

There is one generation per year. Adults are on wing from February to May.

== Subspecies ==
- Anumeta hilgerti hilgerti
- Anumeta hilgerti popovi (Israel)
