= Agdistis clara =

Scientific classification
- Kingdom: Animalia
- Phylum: Arthropoda
- Class: Insecta
- Order: Lepidoptera
- Family: Pterophoridae
- Genus: Agdistis
- Species: A. clara

Binomial name
- Agdistis clara Arenberger, 1986

Species of plume moth

Agdistis clara is a moth in the family Pterophoridae. It is known from Namibia, Botswana and South Africa.
