= Agdistis qurayyahiensis =

Scientific classification
- Kingdom: Animalia
- Phylum: Arthropoda
- Class: Insecta
- Order: Lepidoptera
- Family: Pterophoridae
- Genus: Agdistis
- Species: A. qurayyahiensis

Binomial name
- Agdistis qurayyahiensis Gielis, 2008

Species of plume moth

Agdistis qurayyahiensis is a moth in the family Pterophoridae. It is known from the United Arab Emirates.
