= Agdistis salsolae =

Scientific classification
- Domain: Eukaryota
- Kingdom: Animalia
- Phylum: Arthropoda
- Class: Insecta
- Order: Lepidoptera
- Family: Pterophoridae
- Genus: Agdistis
- Species: A. salsolae

Binomial name
- Agdistis salsolae Walsingham, 1908

Synonyms
- Agdistis pinkeri Bigot, 1972

Species of plume moth

Agdistis salsolae is a moth of the family Pterophoridae. It is endemic to the Canary Islands.

The wingspan is 16–18 mm. There are three generations per year, with adults on wing from March to April, from June to July and in October.

The larvae feed on Salsola oppositifolia.
