= Agdistis parvella =

Scientific classification
- Domain: Eukaryota
- Kingdom: Animalia
- Phylum: Arthropoda
- Class: Insecta
- Order: Lepidoptera
- Family: Pterophoridae
- Genus: Agdistis
- Species: A. parvella

Binomial name
- Agdistis parvella Amsel, 1958

Species of plume moth

Agdistis parvella is a moth in the family Pterophoridae. It is known from Saudi Arabia, Oman and Iran.
