= Agdistis glaseri =

Scientific classification
- Kingdom: Animalia
- Phylum: Arthropoda
- Class: Insecta
- Order: Lepidoptera
- Family: Pterophoridae
- Genus: Agdistis
- Species: A. glaseri

Binomial name
- Agdistis glaseri Arenberger, 1978

Species of plume moth

Agdistis glaseri is a moth in the family Pterophoridae. It is known from Spain.

The wingspan is 24–26 mm. The forewings are grey and the hindwings are white.
