= Agdistis bellissima =

Scientific classification
- Kingdom: Animalia
- Phylum: Arthropoda
- Class: Insecta
- Order: Lepidoptera
- Family: Pterophoridae
- Genus: Agdistis
- Species: A. bellissima

Binomial name
- Agdistis bellissima Arenberger, 1975

Species of plume moth

Agdistis bellissima is a moth in the family Pterophoridae. It is known from Egypt, Saudi Arabia, Yemen, Jordan, Morocco and Tunisia.
