= Agdistis iranica =

Scientific classification
- Domain: Eukaryota
- Kingdom: Animalia
- Phylum: Arthropoda
- Class: Insecta
- Order: Lepidoptera
- Family: Pterophoridae
- Genus: Agdistis
- Species: A. iranica

Binomial name
- Agdistis iranica Alipanah & Ustjuzhanin, 2006

Species of plume moth

Agdistis iranica is a moth in the family Pterophoridae. It is known from Iran.
