= Agdistis gerasimovi =

Scientific classification
- Kingdom: Animalia
- Phylum: Arthropoda
- Class: Insecta
- Order: Lepidoptera
- Family: Pterophoridae
- Genus: Agdistis
- Species: A. gerasimovi

Binomial name
- Agdistis gerasimovi Zagulajev & Blumental, 1994

Synonyms
- Agdistis detruncatum Zagulajev & Blumental, 1994

Species of plume moth

Agdistis gerasimovi is a moth of the family Pterophoridae. It is found in Central Asian riparian woodlands in Uzbekistan and Tajikistan.
