= Agdistis falkovitshi =

Scientific classification
- Kingdom: Animalia
- Phylum: Arthropoda
- Class: Insecta
- Order: Lepidoptera
- Family: Pterophoridae
- Genus: Agdistis
- Species: A. falkovitshi

Binomial name
- Agdistis falkovitshi Zagulajev, 1986

Species of plume moth

Agdistis falkovitshi is a moth of the family Pterophoridae. It is found in Turkmenistan, Russia (including the Caucasus and Daghestan) and Kazakhstan.
