= Agdistis namibiana =

Scientific classification
- Kingdom: Animalia
- Phylum: Arthropoda
- Class: Insecta
- Order: Lepidoptera
- Family: Pterophoridae
- Genus: Agdistis
- Species: A. namibiana

Binomial name
- Agdistis namibiana Arenberger, 1988

Species of plume moth

Agdistis namibiana is a moth in the family Pterophoridae. It is known from Namibia.
