= Agdistis turkestanica =

Scientific classification
- Domain: Eukaryota
- Kingdom: Animalia
- Phylum: Arthropoda
- Class: Insecta
- Order: Lepidoptera
- Family: Pterophoridae
- Genus: Agdistis
- Species: A. turkestanica

Binomial name
- Agdistis turkestanica Zagulajev, 1990

Synonyms
- Agdistis pseudomeylaniella Gibeaux, 1997

Species of plume moth

Agdistis turkestanica is a moth of the family Pterophoridae. It is found in Turkmenistan and Turkestan.
