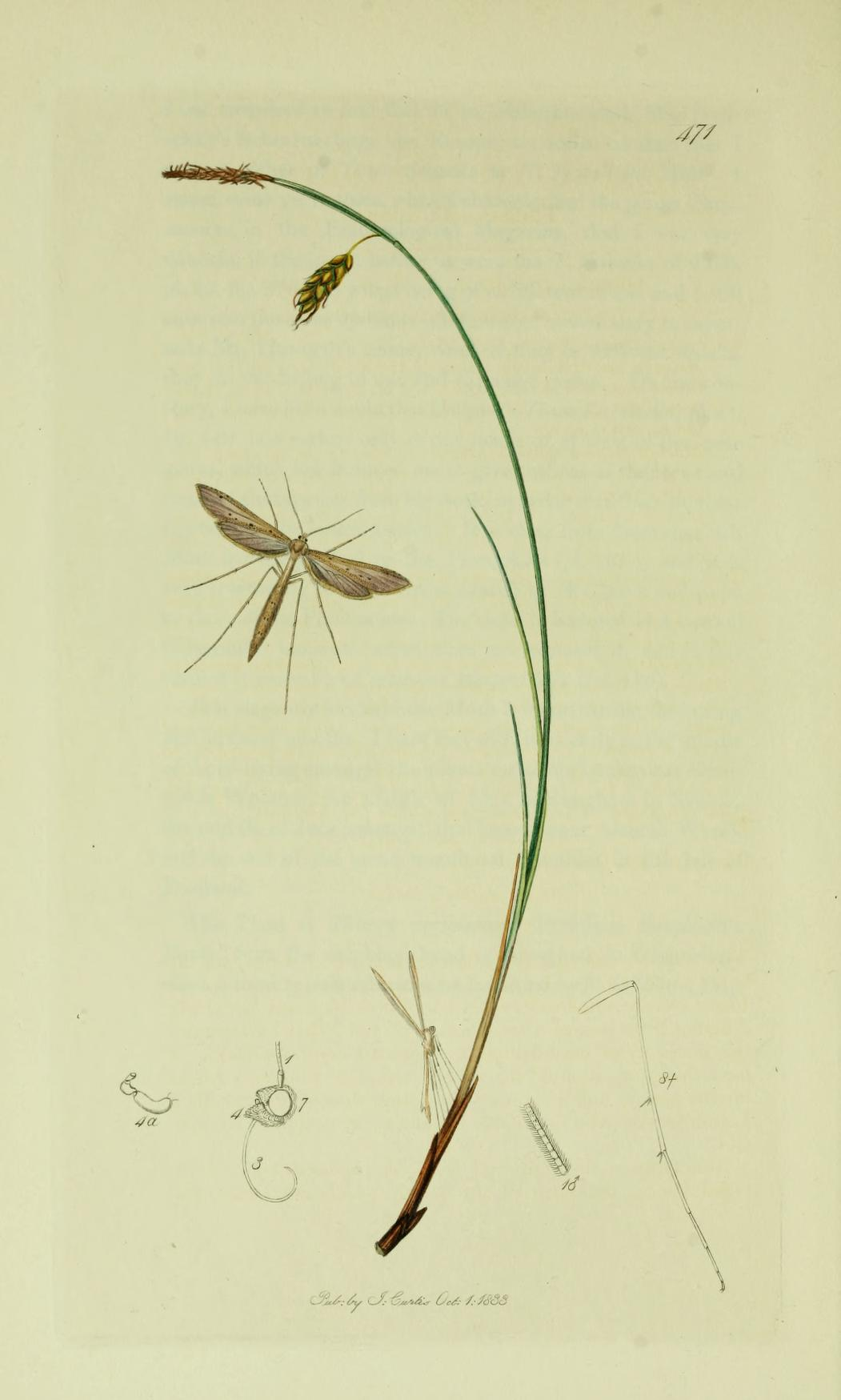
- Illustration from John Curtis's British Entomology Volume 6

Scientific classification
- Domain: Eukaryota
- Kingdom: Animalia
- Phylum: Arthropoda
- Class: Insecta
- Order: Lepidoptera
- Family: Pterophoridae
- Genus: Agdistis
- Species: A. meridionalis

Binomial name
- Agdistis meridionalis (Zeller, 1847)

Synonyms
- List: Adactyla meridionalis Zeller, 1847; Agdistis staticis Millière, 1875; Agdistis portlandica Tutt, 1906; Agdistis staticis var. delicatulella Chrétien, 1917; Agdistis delicatulella (Chrétien, 1917); Agdistis clivicola Meyrick, 1928; Agdistis tyrrhenica Amsel, 1951; Agdistis prolai Hartig, 1953

= Agdistis meridionalis =

Species of plume moth

Agdistis meridionalis, the sea-side plume, is a moth of the family Pterophoridae, first described by the German entomologist Philipp Christoph Zeller in 1847. It is found in Europe.

== Description ==
The wingspan is 22–25 mm. Adults are on wing from July to October, in two generations. The preferred habitats are grassy coastal slopes, cliffs and undercliffs where they can be found resting by day, with the rolled wings pointing forward and upwards.

The larvae feed on the leaves of rock sea-lavender (Limonium binervosum).

== Distribution ==
Agdistis meridionalis is found in Europe mostly in countries bordering the Mediterranean.
