= Agdistis minima =

Scientific classification
- Domain: Eukaryota
- Kingdom: Animalia
- Phylum: Arthropoda
- Class: Insecta
- Order: Lepidoptera
- Family: Pterophoridae
- Genus: Agdistis
- Species: A. minima

Binomial name
- Agdistis minima Walsingham, 1900

Species of plume moth

Agdistis minima is a moth in the family Pterophoridae. It is known from Socotra, Yemen.
