= Agdistis criocephala =

Scientific classification
- Domain: Eukaryota
- Kingdom: Animalia
- Phylum: Arthropoda
- Class: Insecta
- Order: Lepidoptera
- Family: Pterophoridae
- Genus: Agdistis
- Species: A. criocephala

Binomial name
- Agdistis criocephala Meyrick, 1909

Species of plume moth

Agdistis criocephala is a moth in the family Pterophoridae. It is known from South Africa and Namibia.
