= Agdistis kenyana =

Scientific classification
- Kingdom: Animalia
- Phylum: Arthropoda
- Class: Insecta
- Order: Lepidoptera
- Family: Pterophoridae
- Genus: Agdistis
- Species: A. kenyana

Binomial name
- Agdistis kenyana Arenberger, 1988

Species of plume moth

Agdistis kenyana is a moth in the family Pterophoridae. It is known from Kenya and Tanzania.
