= Agdistis dicksoni =

Scientific classification
- Kingdom: Animalia
- Phylum: Arthropoda
- Clade: Pancrustacea
- Class: Insecta
- Order: Lepidoptera
- Family: Pterophoridae
- Genus: Agdistis
- Species: A. dicksoni

Binomial name
- Agdistis dicksoni Kovtunovich & Ustjuzhanin, 2009

Species of plume moth

Agdistis dicksoni is a moth in the family Pterophoridae. It is known from South Africa (Western and Northern Cape).

The wingspan is 18–21 mm. Adults are on wing from June to December.

== Etymology ==
The species is named after Dr C.G.C. Dickson, a famous lepidopterologist.
