= Agdistis malitiosa =

Scientific classification
- Domain: Eukaryota
- Kingdom: Animalia
- Phylum: Arthropoda
- Class: Insecta
- Order: Lepidoptera
- Family: Pterophoridae
- Genus: Agdistis
- Species: A. malitiosa

Binomial name
- Agdistis malitiosa Meyrick, 1909

Species of plume moth

Agdistis malitiosa is a moth in the family Pterophoridae. It is known from Namibia, South Africa, Kenya, Tanzania, Uganda and the Democratic Republic of Congo.
