= Agdistis infumata =

Scientific classification
- Domain: Eukaryota
- Kingdom: Animalia
- Phylum: Arthropoda
- Class: Insecta
- Order: Lepidoptera
- Family: Pterophoridae
- Genus: Agdistis
- Species: A. infumata

Binomial name
- Agdistis infumata Meyrick, 1912

Species of plume moth

Agdistis infumata is a moth in the family Pterophoridae. It is known from South Africa.
