= Agdistis varii =

Scientific classification
- Kingdom: Animalia
- Phylum: Arthropoda
- Clade: Pancrustacea
- Class: Insecta
- Order: Lepidoptera
- Family: Pterophoridae
- Genus: Agdistis
- Species: A. varii

Binomial name
- Agdistis varii Kovtunovich & Ustjuzhanin, 2009

Species of plume moth

Agdistis varii is a moth in the family Pterophoridae. It is known from South Africa (Mpumalanga, Limpopo) and Zimbabwe.

The wingspan is 16–20 mm. Adults are on wing from February to May.

== Etymology ==
The species is named after Dr L. Vari, head of the Lepidoptera Department, Transvaal Museum (Pretoria).
