= Agdistis quagga =

Scientific classification
- Kingdom: Animalia
- Phylum: Arthropoda
- Class: Insecta
- Order: Lepidoptera
- Family: Pterophoridae
- Genus: Agdistis
- Species: A. quagga

Binomial name
- Agdistis quagga Arenberger, 2009

Species of plume moth

Agdistis quagga is a moth in the family Pterophoridae. It is known from South Africa.
