= Agdistis incisa =

Scientific classification
- Kingdom: Animalia
- Phylum: Arthropoda
- Class: Insecta
- Order: Lepidoptera
- Family: Pterophoridae
- Genus: Agdistis
- Species: A. incisa

Binomial name
- Agdistis incisa Arenberger & Buchsbaum, 2000

Species of plume moth

Agdistis incisa is a moth of the family Pterophoridae.
