= Agdistis jansei =

Scientific classification
- Kingdom: Animalia
- Phylum: Arthropoda
- Clade: Pancrustacea
- Class: Insecta
- Order: Lepidoptera
- Family: Pterophoridae
- Genus: Agdistis
- Species: A. jansei

Binomial name
- Agdistis jansei Kovtunovich & Ustjuzhanin, 2009

Species of plume moth

Agdistis jansei is a moth in the family Pterophoridae. It is known from South Africa (Northern Cape, Western Cape, Free State, Mpumalanga).

The wingspan is 19–26 mm.
