= Heteropalpia =

Scientific classification
- Kingdom: Animalia
- Phylum: Arthropoda
- Clade: Pancrustacea
- Class: Insecta
- Order: Lepidoptera
- Superfamily: Noctuoidea
- Family: Erebidae
- Tribe: Ophiusini
- Genus: Heteropalpia; Berio, 1939

Genus of moths

Heteropalpia is a genus of moths in the family Erebidae. The genus was erected by Emilio Berio in 1939.

== Species ==
- Heteropalpia acrosticta Püngeler, 1904
- Heteropalpia cortytoides Berio, 1939
- Heteropalpia makabana Hacker & Fibiger, 2006
- Heteropalpia profesta Christoph, 1887
- Heteropalpia rosacea Rebel, 1907
- Heteropalpia vetusta Walker, 1865
- Heteropalpia wiltshirei Hacker & Ebert, 2002
