= Agdistis melitensis =

Scientific classification
- Domain: Eukaryota
- Kingdom: Animalia
- Phylum: Arthropoda
- Class: Insecta
- Order: Lepidoptera
- Family: Pterophoridae
- Genus: Agdistis
- Species: A. melitensis

Binomial name
- Agdistis melitensis Amsel, 1954

Species of plume moth

Agdistis melitensis is a moth of the Pterophoroidea family. It is found in Malta, Sicily, and Sardinia.
