= Agdistis swakopi =

Scientific classification
- Kingdom: Animalia
- Phylum: Arthropoda
- Class: Insecta
- Order: Lepidoptera
- Family: Pterophoridae
- Genus: Agdistis
- Species: A. swakopi

Binomial name
- Agdistis swakopi Arenberger, 2009

Species of plume moth

Agdistis swakopi is a moth in the family Pterophoridae. It is known from Namibia.
