= Agdistis pustulalis =

Scientific classification
- Domain: Eukaryota
- Kingdom: Animalia
- Phylum: Arthropoda
- Class: Insecta
- Order: Lepidoptera
- Family: Pterophoridae
- Genus: Agdistis
- Species: A. pustulalis

Binomial name
- Agdistis pustulalis Walker, 1864

Species of plume moth

Agdistis pustulalis is a moth in the family Pterophoridae. It is known from South Africa, Lesotho, Namibia, Mozambique, Zimbabwe, Zambia and Malawi.
