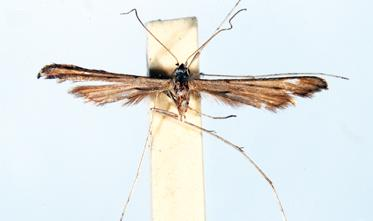

Scientific classification
- Kingdom: Animalia
- Phylum: Arthropoda
- Class: Insecta
- Order: Lepidoptera
- Family: Pterophoridae
- Genus: Agdistis
- Species: A. bouyeri

Binomial name
- Agdistis bouyeri Gielis, 2008

= Agdistis bouyeri =

Species of plume moth

Agdistis bouyeri is a moth of the family Pterophoroidea. It is found in Angola.

The wingspan is 15–17 mm. The moth flies from January to February.
