= Agdistis dahurica =

Scientific classification
- Domain: Eukaryota
- Kingdom: Animalia
- Phylum: Arthropoda
- Class: Insecta
- Order: Lepidoptera
- Family: Pterophoridae
- Genus: Agdistis
- Species: A. dahurica

Binomial name
- Agdistis dahurica Zagulajev, 1994

Species of plume moth

Agdistis dahurica is a moth of the family Pterophoridae. It is found in the southern steppe regions of the Chita Oblast in Russia.
