= Agdistis malleana =

Scientific classification
- Kingdom: Animalia
- Phylum: Arthropoda
- Class: Insecta
- Order: Lepidoptera
- Family: Pterophoridae
- Genus: Agdistis
- Species: A. malleana

Binomial name
- Agdistis malleana Arenberger, 1988

Species of plume moth

Agdistis malleana is a moth in the family Pterophoridae. It is known from South Africa and Swaziland.
