= Agdistis murgabica =

Scientific classification
- Kingdom: Animalia
- Phylum: Arthropoda
- Clade: Pancrustacea
- Class: Insecta
- Order: Lepidoptera
- Family: Pterophoridae
- Genus: Agdistis
- Species: A. murgabica

Binomial name
- Agdistis murgabica Zagulajev & Blumental, 1994

Species of plume moth

Agdistis murgabica is a moth of the family Pterophoridae. It is found in central Asia.
