= Agdistis halodelta =

Scientific classification
- Kingdom: Animalia
- Phylum: Arthropoda
- Class: Insecta
- Order: Lepidoptera
- Family: Pterophoridae
- Genus: Agdistis
- Species: A. halodelta

Binomial name
- Agdistis halodelta Meyrick, 1925

Synonyms
- Agdistis lippensi Amsel, 1955

Species of plume moth

Agdistis halodelta is a moth of the family Pterophoridae. It is known from the Iberian Peninsula, North Africa and Israel.
