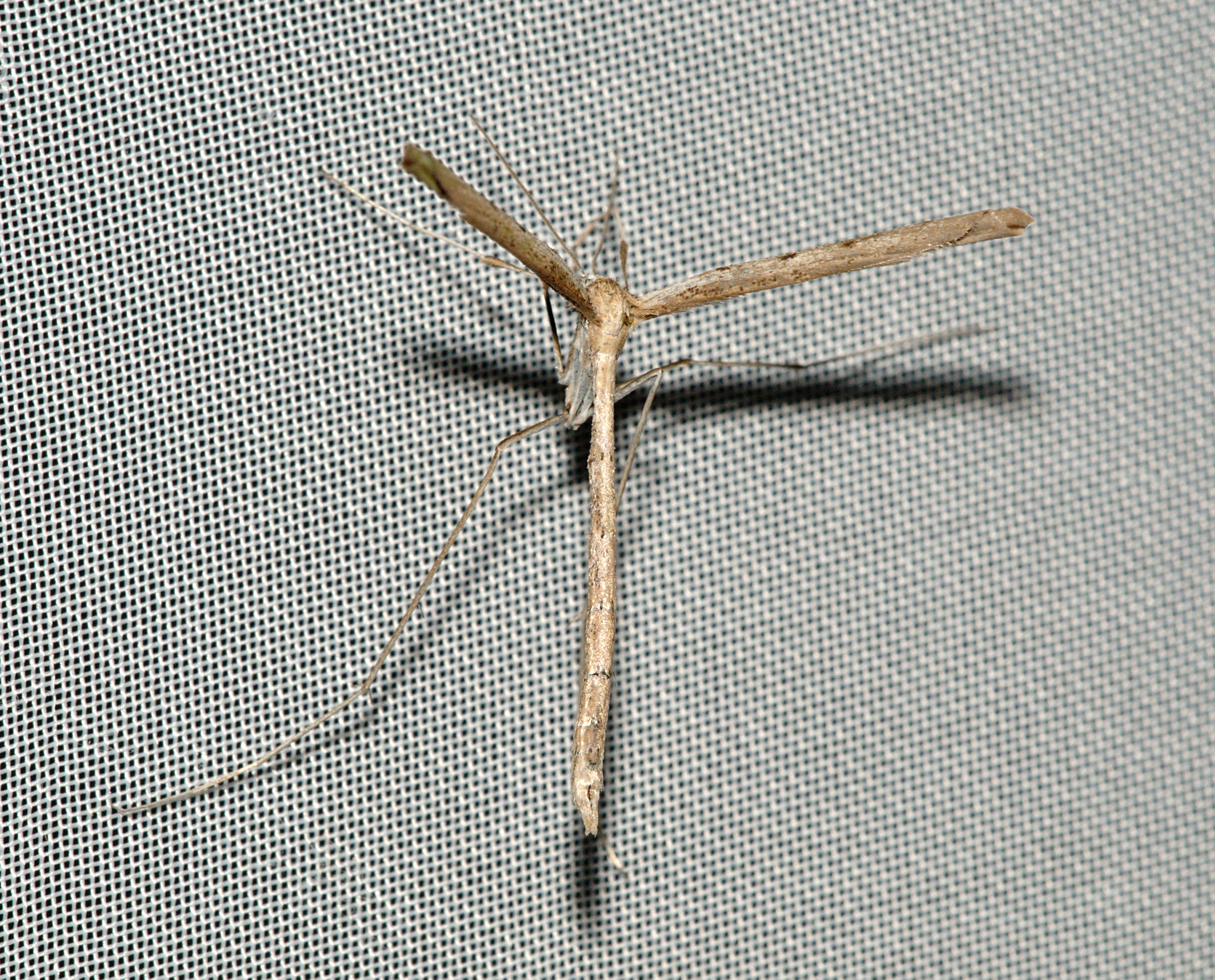

Scientific classification
- Kingdom: Animalia
- Phylum: Arthropoda
- Class: Insecta
- Order: Lepidoptera
- Family: Pterophoridae
- Genus: Agdistis
- Species: A. intermedia

Binomial name
- Agdistis intermedia Caradja, 1920

Synonyms
- Adactyla benneti var. intermedia Caradja, 1920; Agdistis hungarica Amsel, 1955; Agdistis singula Arenberger, 1995

= Agdistis intermedia =

Species of plume moth

Agdistis intermedia is a moth of the family Pterophoridae. It is found from Hungary and Romania east to Russia and Kazakhstan.

Its wingspan measures 24–30 mm. Adults are on wing from June to August.

The larvae feed on Limonium vulgare.

== Original description ==
As Adactyla benneti var. intermedia, in Caradja, Aristides (1920). "Beitrag zur Kenntnis der geographischen Verbreitung der Mikrolepidopteren des palaearktischen Faunen- gebietes nebst Beschreibung neuer Formen. III Teil". Deutsche Entomologische Zeitschrift, Iris. 34: 88.
