= Agdistis tigrovaja =

Scientific classification
- Kingdom: Animalia
- Phylum: Arthropoda
- Clade: Pancrustacea
- Class: Insecta
- Order: Lepidoptera
- Family: Pterophoridae
- Genus: Agdistis
- Species: A. tigrovaja

Binomial name
- Agdistis tigrovaja Arenberger, 2001

Species of plume moth

Agdistis tigrovaja is a moth of the family Pterophoridae. It is found in Tajikistan.

The wingspan is 15–16 millimetres (0.59–0.63 in) for females. The forewings are grey. Adults have been recorded in July and August.
