= Agdistis espunae =

Scientific classification
- Kingdom: Animalia
- Phylum: Arthropoda
- Class: Insecta
- Order: Lepidoptera
- Family: Pterophoridae
- Genus: Agdistis
- Species: A. espunae

Binomial name
- Agdistis espunae Arenberger, 1978

Species of plume moth

Agdistis espunae is a moth in the family Pterophoridae. It is known from Spain.

The wingspan is 22–25 mm. The forewings and hindwings are grey.
