= Agdistis cypriota =

Scientific classification
- Kingdom: Animalia
- Phylum: Arthropoda
- Class: Insecta
- Order: Lepidoptera
- Family: Pterophoridae
- Genus: Agdistis
- Species: A. cypriota

Binomial name
- Agdistis cypriota Arenberger, 1983

Species of plume moth

Agdistis cypriota is a moth in the family Pterophoridae. It is known from Cyprus, Turkey and Tunisia.
