= Agdistis nigra =

Scientific classification
- Domain: Eukaryota
- Kingdom: Animalia
- Phylum: Arthropoda
- Class: Insecta
- Order: Lepidoptera
- Family: Pterophoridae
- Genus: Agdistis
- Species: A. nigra

Binomial name
- Agdistis nigra Amsel, 1955

Species of plume moth

Agdistis nigra is a moth in the family Pterophoridae. It is known from Cyprus and Israel.

The wingspan is about 18 mm. The forewings and hindwings are dark grey.
