= Agdistis lomholdti =

Scientific classification
- Kingdom: Animalia
- Phylum: Arthropoda
- Class: Insecta
- Order: Lepidoptera
- Family: Pterophoridae
- Genus: Agdistis
- Species: A. lomholdti

Binomial name
- Agdistis lomholdti Gielis, 1990

Species of plume moth

Agdistis lomholdti is a moth in the family Pterophoridae. It is known from South Africa and Namibia.
