= Agdistis rubasiensis =

Scientific classification
- Kingdom: Animalia
- Phylum: Arthropoda
- Class: Insecta
- Order: Lepidoptera
- Family: Pterophoridae
- Genus: Agdistis
- Species: A. rubasiensis

Binomial name
- Agdistis rubasiensis Zagulajev, 1985

Species of plume moth

Agdistis rubasiensis is a moth of the family Pterophoridae. It is found in Russia (including the Caucasus and Dagestan), as well as Azerbaijan. In Azerbaijan, it is found in saline habitats.
