= Agdistis gittia =

Scientific classification
- Kingdom: Animalia
- Phylum: Arthropoda
- Class: Insecta
- Order: Lepidoptera
- Family: Pterophoridae
- Genus: Agdistis
- Species: A. gittia

Binomial name
- Agdistis gittia Arenberger, 1988

Species of plume moth

Agdistis gittia is a moth in the family Pterophoridae. It is known from Spain.

The wingspan is 22–23 mm. The forewings and hindwings are greyish brown.
