= Agdistis omani =

Scientific classification
- Kingdom: Animalia
- Phylum: Arthropoda
- Class: Insecta
- Order: Lepidoptera
- Family: Pterophoridae
- Genus: Agdistis
- Species: A. omani

Binomial name
- Agdistis omani Arenberger, 2008

Species of plume moth

Agdistis omani is a moth of the family Pterophoridae. It is found in Oman.
