= Agdistis tsumkwe =

Scientific classification
- Kingdom: Animalia
- Phylum: Arthropoda
- Class: Insecta
- Order: Lepidoptera
- Family: Pterophoridae
- Genus: Agdistis
- Species: A. tsumkwe

Binomial name
- Agdistis tsumkwe Arenberger, 2001

Species of plume moth

Agdistis tsumkwe is a moth in the family Pterophoridae. It is known from South Africa and Namibia.
