= Agdistis piccolo =

Scientific classification
- Domain: Eukaryota
- Kingdom: Animalia
- Phylum: Arthropoda
- Class: Insecta
- Order: Lepidoptera
- Family: Pterophoridae
- Genus: Agdistis
- Species: A. piccolo

Binomial name
- Agdistis piccolo Gielis, 1990

Species of plume moth

Agdistis piccolo is a moth in the family Pterophoridae. It is known from South Africa and Namibia.
