= Agdistis karischi =

Scientific classification
- Kingdom: Animalia
- Phylum: Arthropoda
- Class: Insecta
- Order: Lepidoptera
- Family: Pterophoridae
- Genus: Agdistis
- Species: A. karischi

Binomial name
- Agdistis karischi Arenberger, 1996

Species of plume moth

Agdistis karischi is a moth in the family Pterophoridae. It is known from South Africa.
