= Anumeta asiatica =

Scientific classification
- Kingdom: Animalia
- Phylum: Arthropoda
- Class: Insecta
- Order: Lepidoptera
- Superfamily: Noctuoidea
- Family: Erebidae
- Genus: Anumeta
- Species: A. asiatica

Binomial name
- Anumeta asiatica Wiltshire, 1961

Species of moth

Anumeta asiatica is a moth of the family Erebidae first described by Wiltshire in 1961. It is found in south-western Iran, Iraq, Kuwait, Saudi Arabia, Oman, the United Arab Emirates and in the Arava Valley in Israel.

There is one generation per year. Adults are on wing from May to August.

The larvae probably feed on Calligonum species.
