= Agdistis notabilis =

Scientific classification
- Kingdom: Animalia
- Phylum: Arthropoda
- Clade: Pancrustacea
- Class: Insecta
- Order: Lepidoptera
- Family: Pterophoridae
- Genus: Agdistis
- Species: A. notabilis

Binomial name
- Agdistis notabilis Gielis & Karsholt, 2009

Species of plume moth

Agdistis notabilis is a moth in the family Pterophoridae. It was first described in 2009 after specimens collected from near Tarrafal, northern Santiago Island, Cape Verde.
