= Agdistis facetus =

Scientific classification
- Kingdom: Animalia
- Phylum: Arthropoda
- Clade: Pancrustacea
- Class: Insecta
- Order: Lepidoptera
- Family: Pterophoridae
- Genus: Agdistis
- Species: A. facetus

Binomial name
- Agdistis facetus Bigot, 1969

Species of plume moth

Agdistis facetus is a moth in the family Pterophoridae. It is known from the Democratic Republic of Congo.
