= Agdistis manicata =

Scientific classification
- Kingdom: Animalia
- Phylum: Arthropoda
- Class: Insecta
- Order: Lepidoptera
- Family: Pterophoridae
- Genus: Agdistis
- Species: A. manicata

Binomial name
- Agdistis manicata Staudinger, 1859

Synonyms
- Agdistis gigas Turati, 1924; Agdistis lutescens Turati, 1927; Agdistis tunesiella Amsel, 1955

Species of plume moth

Agdistis manicata is a moth in the family Pterophoridae. It is known from France, Portugal, Spain, southern Russia, Libya and Tunisia. In 2019, the species was found in Azerbaijan for the first time.

The wingspan is about 25 mm. The forewings are bright grey.

The larvae feed on Limoniastrum monopetalum.
