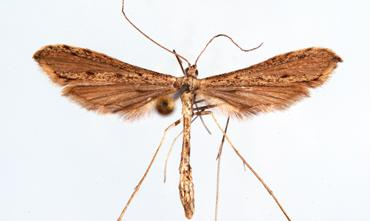

Scientific classification
- Kingdom: Animalia
- Phylum: Arthropoda
- Class: Insecta
- Order: Lepidoptera
- Family: Pterophoridae
- Genus: Agdistis
- Species: A. linnaei

Binomial name
- Agdistis linnaei Gielis, 2008

= Agdistis linnaei =

Species of plume moth

Agdistis linnaei is a moth of the family Pterophoroidea. It is found in Tanzania and Kenya.

The wingspan is 14–19 mm. The moth flies in April and from November to January.
