= Agdistis huemeri =

Scientific classification
- Kingdom: Animalia
- Phylum: Arthropoda
- Class: Insecta
- Order: Lepidoptera
- Family: Pterophoridae
- Genus: Agdistis
- Species: A. huemeri

Binomial name
- Agdistis huemeri Arenberger, 2002

Species of plume moth

Agdistis huemeri is a moth in the family Pterophoridae. It is known from Iran and Turkmenistan (Kopet Dag).
