= Agdistis danutae =

Scientific classification
- Kingdom: Animalia
- Phylum: Arthropoda
- Clade: Pancrustacea
- Class: Insecta
- Order: Lepidoptera
- Family: Pterophoridae
- Genus: Agdistis
- Species: A. danutae

Binomial name
- Agdistis danutae Kovtunovich & Ustjuzhanin, 2009

Species of plume moth

Agdistis danutae is a moth in the family Pterophoridae. It is known from Namibia.

The wingspan is about 20 mm. Adults are on wing in April.

== Etymology ==
The species is named after Dr Danuta J. Plisko of Pietermaritzburg, South Africa.
