= Agdistis riftvalleyi =

Scientific classification
- Kingdom: Animalia
- Phylum: Arthropoda
- Class: Insecta
- Order: Lepidoptera
- Family: Pterophoridae
- Genus: Agdistis
- Species: A. riftvalleyi

Binomial name
- Agdistis riftvalleyi Arenberger, 2001

Species of plume moth

Agdistis riftvalleyi is a moth in the family Pterophoridae. It is known from Kenya and Yemen.
