= Agdistis krooni =

Scientific classification
- Kingdom: Animalia
- Phylum: Arthropoda
- Clade: Pancrustacea
- Class: Insecta
- Order: Lepidoptera
- Family: Pterophoridae
- Genus: Agdistis
- Species: A. krooni

Binomial name
- Agdistis krooni Kovtunovich & Ustjuzhanin, 2009

Species of plume moth

Agdistis krooni is a moth in the family Pterophoridae. It is known from South Africa (Northern Cape province).

The wingspan is 19–21.5 millimetres (0.75–0.85 in). The forewings are grey without apparent dots. The longitudinal medium part of the wing has a noticeable ochre tinge. The hindwings are uniformly grey. Adults are in wing in March and November.

== Etymology ==
The species is named after Dr D. Kroon, South Africa, a researcher of microlepidoptera.
