= Agdistis toliarensis =

Scientific classification
- Kingdom: Animalia
- Phylum: Arthropoda
- Clade: Pancrustacea
- Class: Insecta
- Order: Lepidoptera
- Family: Pterophoridae
- Genus: Agdistis
- Species: A. toliarensis

Binomial name
- Agdistis toliarensis Bigot, 1987

Species of plume moth

Agdistis toliarensis is a moth in the family Pterophoridae. It is known from Madagascar.
