= Agdistis bigoti =

Scientific classification
- Kingdom: Animalia
- Phylum: Arthropoda
- Class: Insecta
- Order: Lepidoptera
- Family: Pterophoridae
- Genus: Agdistis
- Species: A. bigoti

Binomial name
- Agdistis bigoti Arenberger 1976

Species of plume moth

Agdistis bigoti is a moth in the family Pterophoridae. It is known from Crete.

The wingspan is 24–26 mm. The forewings are grey, as are the hindwings, although these are somewhat brighter.
