= Agdistis zhengi =

Scientific classification
- Kingdom: Animalia
- Phylum: Arthropoda
- Class: Insecta
- Order: Lepidoptera
- Family: Pterophoridae
- Genus: Agdistis
- Species: A. zhengi

Binomial name
- Agdistis zhengi Hao & Li, 2007

Species of plume moth

Agdistis zhengi is a species of moth in the family Pterophoridae. It was described by Shi-Mei Hao and Hou-Hun Li in 2007. The species is found in China.
