= Agdistis meyi =

Scientific classification
- Kingdom: Animalia
- Phylum: Arthropoda
- Class: Insecta
- Order: Lepidoptera
- Family: Pterophoridae
- Genus: Agdistis
- Species: A. meyi

Binomial name
- Agdistis meyi Arenberger, 2008

Species of plume moth

Agdistis meyi is a moth in the family Pterophoridae. It is known from South Africa and Zimbabwe.
