= Agdistis sphinx =

Scientific classification
- Domain: Eukaryota
- Kingdom: Animalia
- Phylum: Arthropoda
- Class: Insecta
- Order: Lepidoptera
- Family: Pterophoridae
- Genus: Agdistis
- Species: A. sphinx

Binomial name
- Agdistis sphinx Walsingham, 1907

Species of plume moth

Agdistis sphinx is a moth in the family Pterophoridae. It is known from Algeria and Morocco.

The wingspan is 28–35 mm. The forewings are bright grey.

The larvae feed on Limoniastrum species, including Limoniastrum guyonianum.
