= Agdistis protai =

Scientific classification
- Kingdom: Animalia
- Phylum: Arthropoda
- Class: Insecta
- Order: Lepidoptera
- Family: Pterophoridae
- Genus: Agdistis
- Species: A. protai

Binomial name
- Agdistis protai Arenberger, 1973

Species of plume moth

Agdistis protai is a moth in the family Pterophoridae. It is known from Italy (Tuscany, Sardinia), Cyprus and Turkey.

Adults are on wing in July and August.
