= Agdistis neglecta =

Scientific classification
- Kingdom: Animalia
- Phylum: Arthropoda
- Class: Insecta
- Order: Lepidoptera
- Family: Pterophoridae
- Genus: Agdistis
- Species: A. neglecta

Binomial name
- Agdistis neglecta Arenberger, 1976

Species of plume moth

Agdistis neglecta is a moth in the family Pterophoridae. It is known from Spain, Portugal, southern France, the Balearic Islands, Corsica, mainland Italy and Sardinia.

The wingspan is 16–21 mm. The forewings are brown.

The larvae feed on Frankenia species.
