= Agdistis desertorum =

Scientific classification
- Kingdom: Animalia
- Phylum: Arthropoda
- Clade: Pancrustacea
- Class: Insecta
- Order: Lepidoptera
- Family: Pterophoridae
- Genus: Agdistis
- Species: A. desertorum

Binomial name
- Agdistis desertorum Arenberger, 1999

Species of plume moth

Agdistis desertorum is a moth of the family Pterophoridae. It is found in Libya.

The wingspan is about 14 mm for males and females. Males are dark grey, while females are somewhat lighter. Adults have been recorded in August.
