= Agdistis africana =

Scientific classification
- Kingdom: Animalia
- Phylum: Arthropoda
- Class: Insecta
- Order: Lepidoptera
- Family: Pterophoridae
- Genus: Agdistis
- Species: A. africana

Binomial name
- Agdistis africana Arenberger, 1996

Species of plume moth

Agdistis africana is a moth in the family Pterophoridae. This species is known only from the type locality, the Tsitsikamma Coastal National Park in South Africa.
