= Agdistis pala =

Scientific classification
- Kingdom: Animalia
- Phylum: Arthropoda
- Class: Insecta
- Order: Lepidoptera
- Family: Pterophoridae
- Genus: Agdistis
- Species: A. pala

Binomial name
- Agdistis pala Arenberger, 1986

Species of plume moth

Agdistis pala is a moth in the family Pterophoridae. It is known from Namibia.
