= Agdistis spinosa =

Scientific classification
- Kingdom: Animalia
- Phylum: Arthropoda
- Class: Insecta
- Order: Lepidoptera
- Family: Pterophoridae
- Genus: Agdistis
- Species: A. spinosa

Binomial name
- Agdistis spinosa Arenberger, 1986

Species of plume moth

Agdistis spinosa is a moth in the family Pterophoridae from South Africa and Namibia.
