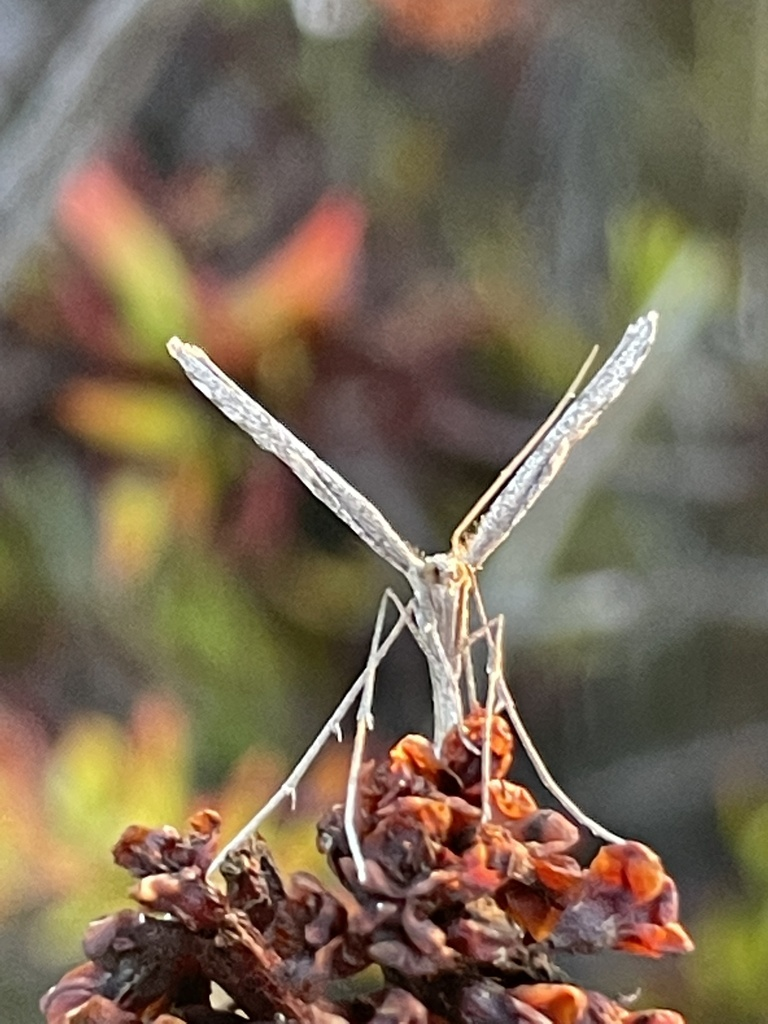

Scientific classification
- Domain: Eukaryota
- Kingdom: Animalia
- Phylum: Arthropoda
- Class: Insecta
- Order: Lepidoptera
- Family: Pterophoridae
- Genus: Agdistis
- Species: A. americana

Binomial name
- Agdistis americana Barnes & Lindsey, 1921

= Agdistis americana =

Species of plume moth

Agdistis americana is a moth of the family Pterophoridae first described by William Barnes and Arthur Ward Lindsey in 1921. It is known from western North America, including California.

The wingspan is about 24 mm.
