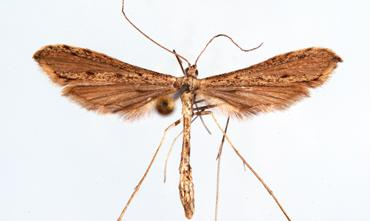
- Agdistis linnaei

Scientific classification
- Domain: Eukaryota
- Kingdom: Animalia
- Phylum: Arthropoda
- Class: Insecta
- Order: Lepidoptera
- Family: Pterophoridae
- Subfamily: Agdistinae; Tutt, 1906
- Genus: Agdistis; Hübner, [1825]

Synonyms
- Adactylus Curtis, 1833; Adactyla Zeller, 1841; Ernestia Tutt, 1907; Herbertia Turr, 1907

= Agdistis (moth) =

Sole genus of plume moth subfamily Agdistinae

Agdistis is a genus of moths in the family Pterophoridae described by Jacob Hübner in 1825. It is the only genus in the Agdistinae subfamily which was described by J. W. Tutt in 1906.

== Species ==
Version 1.1.23.125 of the Catalogue of the Pterophoroidea of the World lists the following species for genus Agdistis:

- Agdistis aberdareana Arenberger, 1988
- Agdistis adactyla (Hübner, [1819])
- Agdistis adenensis Amsel, 1961
- Agdistis africana Arenberger, 1996
- Agdistis aguessei Bigot & Picard, 2004
- Agdistis americana Barnes & Lindsey, 1921
- Agdistis andreeva Arenberger, 2013
- Agdistis anikini Kovtunovich & Ustjuzhanin, 2009
- Agdistis arabica Amsel, 1958
- Agdistis arenbergeri Gielis, 1986
- Agdistis asthenes Bigot, 1970
- Agdistis bellissima Arenberger, 1975
- Agdistis bennetti (Curtis, 1833)
- Agdistis betica Arenberger, 1978
- Agdistis bifurcatus Agenjo, 1952
- Agdistis bigoti Arenberger, 1976
- Agdistis bouyeri Gielis, 2008
- Agdistis buffelsi Kovtunovich & Ustjuzhanin, 2015
- Agdistis cambriana Arenberger, Beard & Karisch, 2016
- Agdistis canariensis Rebel, 1896
- Agdistis capensis Kovtunovich & Ustjuzhanin, 2010
- Agdistis cappadociensis Fazekas, 2000
- Agdistis caradjai Arenberger, 1975
- Agdistis cathae Arenberger, 1999
- Agdistis chardzhouna Arenberger, 1997
- Agdistis clara Arenberger, 1986
- Agdistis cretifera Meyrick, 1909
- Agdistis criocephala Meyrick, 1909
- Agdistis cypriota Arenberger, 1983
- Agdistis dahurica Zagulajev, 1994
- Agdistis damara Kovtunovich & Ustjuzhanin, 2015
- Agdistis danutae Kovtunovich & Ustjuzhanin, 2009
- Agdistis darwini Arenberger, 2009
- Agdistis dentalis Arenberger, 1986
- Agdistis desertorum Arenberger, 1999
- Agdistis dicksoni Kovtunovich & Ustjuzhanin, 2009
- Agdistis dimetra Meyrick, 1924
- Agdistis eberti Arenberger, 2009
- Agdistis endrodyi Kovtunovich & Ustjuzhanin, 2009
- Agdistis espunae Arenberger, 1978
- Agdistis facetus Bigot, 1969
- Agdistis falkovitshi Zagulajev, 1986
- Agdistis flavissima Caradja, 1920
- Agdistis frankeniae (Zeller, 1847)
- Agdistis furcata Arenberger, 1996
- Agdistis gambiensis Gielis, 2011
- Agdistis gerasimovi Zagulajev & Blumental, 1994
- Agdistis gibberipennis Arenberger, 1996
- Agdistis gittia Arenberger, 1988
- Agdistis glaseri Arenberger, 1978
- Agdistis gornostaevi Kovtunovich & Ustjuzhanin, 2010
- Agdistis haghieri Arenberger, 2009
- Agdistis hakimah Arenberger, 1985
- Agdistis halodelta Meyrick, 1925
- Agdistis hartigi Arenberger, 1973
- Agdistis heydeni (Zeller, 1852)
- Agdistis huemeri Arenberger, 2002
- Agdistis hulli Gielis, 1998
- Agdistis incisa Arenberger & Buchsbaum, 2000
- Agdistis infumata Meyrick, 1912
- Agdistis ingens Christoph, 1887
- Agdistis insidiatrix Meyrick, 1933
- Agdistis insolitus Kovtunovich & Ustjuzhanin, 2010
- Agdistis intermedia Caradja, 1920
- Agdistis iranica Alipanah & Ustjuzhanin, 2007
- Agdistis iversoni Kovtunovich & Ustjuzhanin, 2015
- Agdistis jansei Kovtunovich & Ustjuzhanin, 2009
- Agdistis karabachica Zagulajev, 1990
- Agdistis karakalensis Zagulajev, 1990
- Agdistis karischi Arenberger, 1996
- Agdistis kaunda Kovtunovich & Ustjuzhanin, 2015
- Agdistis kazakhstanicus Ustjuzhanin & Kovtunovich, 2014
- Agdistis kenyana Arenberger, 1988
- Agdistis kevintucki Kovtunovich & Ustjuzhanin, 2009
- Agdistis korana Arenberger, 1988
- Agdistis krooni Kovtunovich & Ustjuzhanin, 2009
- Agdistis kruegeri Kovtunovich & Ustjuzhanin, 2009
- Agdistis linnaei Gielis, 2008
- Agdistis lomholdti Gielis, 1990
- Agdistis maghrebi Arenberger, 1976
- Agdistis malitiosa Meyrick, 1909
- Agdistis malleana Arenberger, 1988
- Agdistis manas Ustjuzhanin & Kovtunovich, 2011
- Agdistis manicata Staudinger, 1859
- Agdistis marionae Arenberger, Beard, Hasenfuss & Karisch, 2012
- Agdistis melitensis Amsel, 1954
- Agdistis meridionalis (Zeller, 1847)
- Agdistis mevlaniella Arenberger, 1972
- Agdistis meyi Arenberger, 2008
- Agdistis minima Walsingham, 1900
- Agdistis morini Huemer, 2001
- Agdistis murgabica Zagulajev & Blumental, 1994
- Agdistis myburgi Kovtunovich & Ustjuzhanin, 2009
- Agdistis namaqua Kovtunovich & Ustjuzhanin, 2010
- Agdistis namibiana Arenberger, 1988
- Agdistis nanodes Meyrick, 1906
- Agdistis neglecta Arenberger, 1976
- Agdistis nigra Amsel, 1955
- Agdistis nikolaii Kovtunovich & Ustjuzhanin, 2010
- Agdistis notabilis Gielis & Karsholt, 2009
- Agdistis nyasa Kovtunovich & Ustjuzhanin, 2014
- Agdistis obstinata Meyrick, 1920
- Agdistis olei Arenberger, 1976
- Agdistis omani Arenberger, 2008
- Agdistis paki Ustjuzhanin & Kovtunovich, 2020
- Agdistis pala Arenberger, 1986
- Agdistis paralia (Zeller, 1847)
- Agdistis parvella Amsel, 1958
- Agdistis picardi Bigot, 1964
- Agdistis piccolo Gielis, 1990
- Agdistis potgieteri Kovtunovich & Ustjuzhanin, 2009
- Agdistis prisoner Kovtunovich & Ustjuzhanin, 2010
- Agdistis protai Arenberger, 1973
- Agdistis protecta Arenberger, 1999
- Agdistis pseudocanariensis Arenberger, 1973
- Agdistis pseudomeyi Kovtunovich & Ustjuzhanin, 2015
- Agdistis pustulalis Walker, 1864
- Agdistis pygmaea Amsel, 1955
- Agdistis quagga Arenberger, 2009
- Agdistis qurayyahiensis Gielis, 2008
- Agdistis rastri Arenberger, 2010
- Agdistis reciprocans Meyrick, 1924
- Agdistis riftvalleyi Arenberger, 2001
- Agdistis rubasiensis Zagulajev, 1985
- Agdistis ruhanga Kovtunovich & Ustjuzhanin, 2015
- Agdistis rumurutia Gielis, 2011
- Agdistis rutjani Ustjuzhanin & Kovtunovich, 2011
- Agdistis sabokyi Fazekas, 2000
- Agdistis salsolae Walsingham, 1908
- Agdistis samknotti Kovtunovich & Ustjuzhanin, 2015
- Agdistis sanctaehelenae (Wollaston, 1879)
- Agdistis satanas Millière, 1875
- Agdistis sergeii Kovtunovich & Ustjuzhanin, 2015
- Agdistis singula Arenberger, 1995
- Agdistis sissia Arenberger, 1987
- Agdistis sphinx Walsingham, 1907
- Agdistis spinosa Arenberger, 1986
- Agdistis springbok Kovtunovich & Ustjuzhanin, 2010
- Agdistis streltzovi Kovtunovich & Ustjuzhanin, 2010
- Agdistis swakopi Arenberger, 2009
- Agdistis symmetrica Amsel, 1955
- Agdistis takamukui Nohira, 1919
- Agdistis tamaricis (Zeller, 1847)
- Agdistis tenera Arenberger, 1976
- Agdistis tigrovaja Arenberger, 2001
- Agdistis tihamae Arenberger, 1999
- Agdistis toliarensis Bigot, 1987
- Agdistis tsumkwe Arenberger, 2001
- Agdistis tugai Altermatt, 2008
- Agdistis turia Gielis, 2011
- Agdistis turkestanica Zagulajev, 1990
- Agdistis uncirectangula Hao & Li, 2003
- Agdistis unguica Arenberger, 1988
- Agdistis vansoni Kovtunovich & Ustjuzhanin, 2015
- Agdistis varii Kovtunovich & Ustjuzhanin, 2009
- Agdistis violaceus Kovtunovich & Ustjuzhanin, 2010
- Agdistis wolframi Kovtunovich & Ustjuzhanin, 2015
- Agdistis yakovi Kovtunovich & Ustjuzhanin, 2010
- Agdistis yemenica Arenberger, 1999
- Agdistis zhengi Hao & Li, 2007
