= Agdistis arenbergeri =

Scientific classification
- Kingdom: Animalia
- Phylum: Arthropoda
- Class: Insecta
- Order: Lepidoptera
- Family: Pterophoridae
- Genus: Agdistis
- Species: A. arenbergeri

Binomial name
- Agdistis arenbergeri Gielis, 1986

Species of plume moth

Agdistis arenbergeri is a moth in the family Pterophoridae. It is known to reside in South Africa.
