= Agdistis potgieteri =

Scientific classification
- Kingdom: Animalia
- Phylum: Arthropoda
- Clade: Pancrustacea
- Class: Insecta
- Order: Lepidoptera
- Family: Pterophoridae
- Genus: Agdistis
- Species: A. potgieteri

Binomial name
- Agdistis potgieteri Kovtunovich & Ustjuzhanin, 2009

Species of plume moth

Agdistis potgieteri is a moth in the family Pterophoridae. It is known from South Africa (Free State, Limpopo, and Western and Northern Cape).

The wingspan is 27–32 mm. Adults are on wing from the end of August to January.

== Etymology ==
The species is named after its collector J.H. Potgieter.
