= Agdistis betica =

Scientific classification
- Kingdom: Animalia
- Phylum: Arthropoda
- Clade: Pancrustacea
- Class: Insecta
- Order: Lepidoptera
- Family: Pterophoridae
- Genus: Agdistis
- Species: A. betica

Binomial name
- Agdistis betica Arenberger, 1978

Species of plume moth

Agdistis betica is a moth in the family Pterophoridae. It is known from Spain.

The wingspan is 19–24 mm. The forewings and hindwings are greyish brown.
