= Agdistis endrodyi =

Scientific classification
- Kingdom: Animalia
- Phylum: Arthropoda
- Clade: Pancrustacea
- Class: Insecta
- Order: Lepidoptera
- Family: Pterophoridae
- Genus: Agdistis
- Species: A. endrodyi

Binomial name
- Agdistis endrodyi Kovtunovich & Ustjuzhanin, 2009

Species of plume moth

Agdistis endrodyi is a moth in the family Pterophoridae. It is known from South Africa (Western Cape).

The wingspan is 20–30 mm. Adults are on wing in October.
