= Agdistis bennetii =

Scientific classification
- Domain: Eukaryota
- Kingdom: Animalia
- Phylum: Arthropoda
- Class: Insecta
- Order: Lepidoptera
- Family: Pterophoridae
- Genus: Agdistis
- Species: A. bennetii

Binomial name
- Agdistis bennetii (Curtis, 1833)

Synonyms
- Adactyla bennetii Curtis, 1833; Agdistis bennetti

Species of plume moth

Agdistis bennetii is a moth of the family Pterophoridae found in Europe. It inhabits salt marshes.

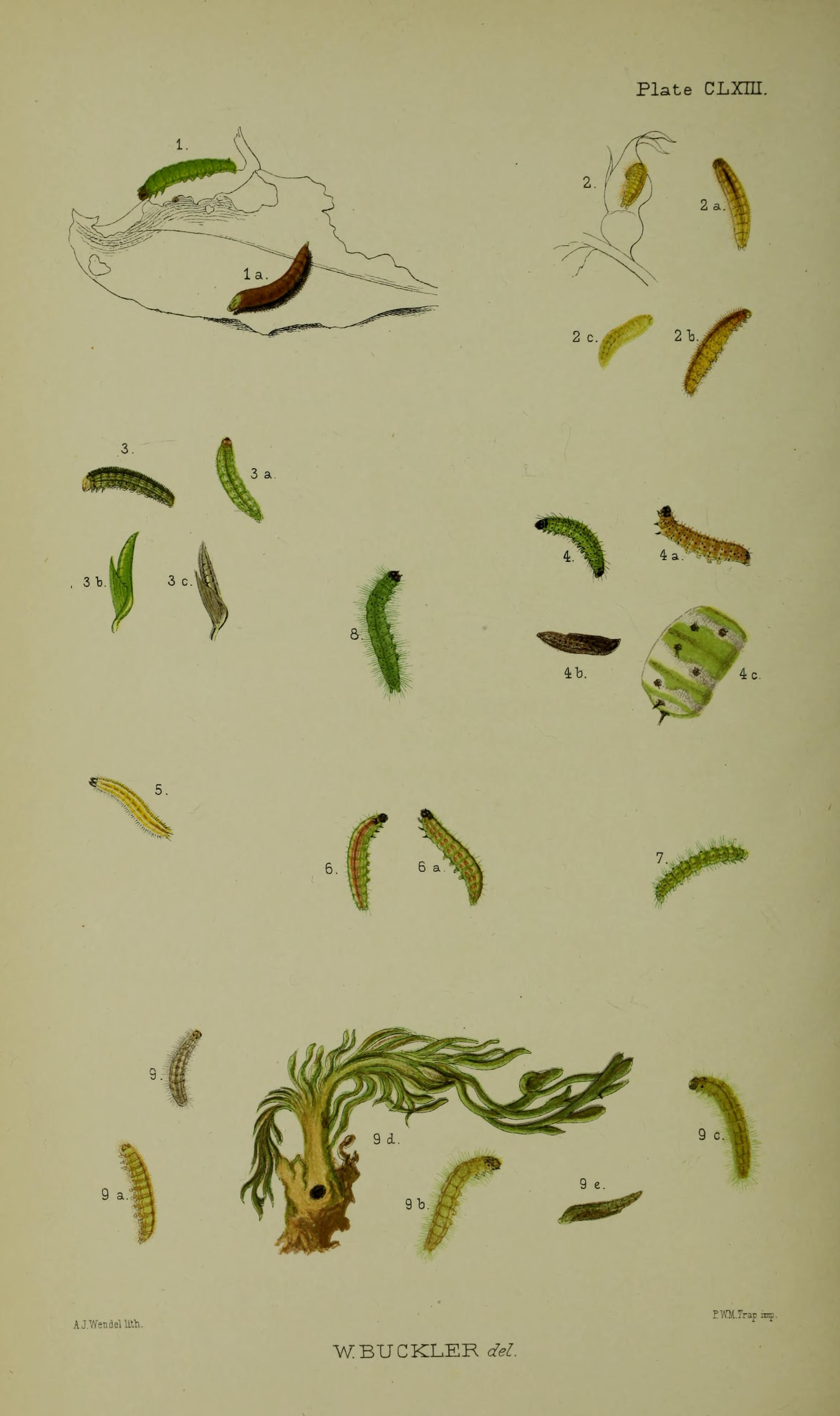
Figs.1 larva after final moult, 1a pupa

== Description ==
The wingspan is 24–30 mm. Adults are greyish brown. There are two generations per year, with adults on wing from mid-May to the beginning of July and again from mid-July to mid-September.

The larvae feed on common sea-lavender (Limonium vulgare) and rock sea-lavender (Limonium binervosum) feeding on the undersides of the leaves.

== Distribution ==
Agdistis bennetti has been recorded in the coastal areas of Great Britain, Denmark, Belgium, the Netherlands, France, Germany, Spain, Italy, Albania, and the former Yugoslavia.
