= Agdistis maghrebi =

Scientific classification
- Kingdom: Animalia
- Phylum: Arthropoda
- Class: Insecta
- Order: Lepidoptera
- Family: Pterophoridae
- Genus: Agdistis
- Species: A. maghrebi

Binomial name
- Agdistis maghrebi Arenberger, 1976

Species of plume moth

Agdistis maghrebi is a moth in the family Pterophoridae. It is known from Algeria.

The wingspan is 21–28 mm. The forewings are greyish brown.
