= Agdistis pygmaea =

Scientific classification
- Domain: Eukaryota
- Kingdom: Animalia
- Phylum: Arthropoda
- Class: Insecta
- Order: Lepidoptera
- Family: Pterophoridae
- Genus: Agdistis
- Species: A. pygmaea

Binomial name
- Agdistis pygmaea Amsel, 1955

Species of plume moth

Agdistis pygmaea is a moth in the family Pterophoridae. It is known from Israel.

The wingspan is about 14 mm. The forewings and hindwings are grey.
