= Agdistis kruegeri =

Scientific classification
- Kingdom: Animalia
- Phylum: Arthropoda
- Clade: Pancrustacea
- Class: Insecta
- Order: Lepidoptera
- Family: Pterophoridae
- Genus: Agdistis
- Species: A. kruegeri

Binomial name
- Agdistis kruegeri Kovtunovich & Ustjuzhanin, 2009

Species of plume moth

Agdistis kruegeri is a moth in the family Pterophoridae. It is known from South Africa (Northern Cape, Western Cape, Eastern Cape, KwaZulu-Natal).

The wingspan is 18–22 mm. Adults are on wing from October to November.

== Etymology ==
The species is named after Dr Martin Krüger (Transvaal Museum, Pretoria).
