= Agdistis cappadociensis =

Scientific classification
- Kingdom: Animalia
- Phylum: Arthropoda
- Class: Insecta
- Order: Lepidoptera
- Family: Pterophoridae
- Genus: Agdistis
- Species: A. cappadociensis

Binomial name
- Agdistis cappadociensis Fazekas, 2000

Species of plume moth

Agdistis cappadociensis is a moth of the family Pterophoridae. It is found in Turkey (including the Sivas Province). The habitat consists of heavily pastured steppe interspersed with ploughed fields. Plants recorded on the site are Crataegus, Allium and Dianthus species.

The wingspan is about 22 mm. Adults have been recorded in May.
