= Agdistis tugai =

Scientific classification
- Domain: Eukaryota
- Kingdom: Animalia
- Phylum: Arthropoda
- Class: Insecta
- Order: Lepidoptera
- Family: Pterophoridae
- Genus: Agdistis
- Species: A. tugai

Binomial name
- Agdistis tugai Altermatt, 2008

Species of plume moth

Agdistis tugai is a moth of the family Pterophoridae. It is found in southern Tajikistan. The habitat consists of tugai forest consisting of Populus diversifolia trees and Tamarix shrubs.

The wingspan is about 26 mm for females.
