= Agdistis paralia =

Scientific classification
- Kingdom: Animalia
- Phylum: Arthropoda
- Clade: Pancrustacea
- Class: Insecta
- Order: Lepidoptera
- Family: Pterophoridae
- Genus: Agdistis
- Species: A. paralia

Binomial name
- Agdistis paralia (Zeller, 1847)

Synonyms
- Adactyla paralia Zeller, 1847

Species of plume moth

Agdistis paralia is a moth in the family Pterophoridae. It is known from Spain, France, Italy (Sardinia, Sicily), Malta, Greece, Israel, Turkmenistan, Tunisia, Algeria and Morocco. It has also been recorded from China (Gansu).

Adults are on wing from April to September.

The larvae feed on Limonium serotinum and Limonium densissimum.
