= Agdistis heydeni =

Scientific classification
- Kingdom: Animalia
- Phylum: Arthropoda
- Clade: Pancrustacea
- Class: Insecta
- Order: Lepidoptera
- Family: Pterophoridae
- Genus: Agdistis
- Species: A. heydeni

Binomial name
- Agdistis heydeni (Zeller, 1852)

Synonyms
- Adactyla heydeni Zeller, 1852; Agdistis excurata Meyrick, 1921

Species of plume moth

Agdistis heydeni is a moth of the family Pterophoridae. It is known from western Asia, southern Europe, Hungary, Poland, North Africa and the Canary Islands.

The larvae feed on Atriplex halimus and Stachys glutinosa. Other recorded foodplants include Lamium, Origanum, Calamintha and Phlomis species.

== Subspecies ==
- Agdistis heydeni heydeni
- Agdistis heydeni canariensis Rebel, 1896 (Canary Islands)
