= Agdistis arabica =

Scientific classification
- Kingdom: Animalia
- Phylum: Arthropoda
- Class: Insecta
- Order: Lepidoptera
- Family: Pterophoridae
- Genus: Agdistis
- Species: A. arabica

Binomial name
- Agdistis arabica Amsel, 1958

Species of plume moth

Agdistis arabica is a moth in the family Pterophoridae. It is known from Israel, Iran, Pakistan, Bahrain, Saudi Arabia, Yemen, Oman, Somalia, Sudan, Tunisia, Egypt and Pakistan.
