= Agdistis hakimah =

Scientific classification
- Kingdom: Animalia
- Phylum: Arthropoda
- Class: Insecta
- Order: Lepidoptera
- Family: Pterophoridae
- Genus: Agdistis
- Species: A. hakimah

Binomial name
- Agdistis hakimah Arenberger, 1985

Species of plume moth

Agdistis hakimah is a moth in the family Pterophoridae. It is known from Bahrain, Saudi Arabia and Yemen.
