= Agdistis ingens =

Scientific classification
- Domain: Eukaryota
- Kingdom: Animalia
- Phylum: Arthropoda
- Class: Insecta
- Order: Lepidoptera
- Family: Pterophoridae
- Genus: Agdistis
- Species: A. ingens

Binomial name
- Agdistis ingens Christoph, 1887

Species of plume moth

Agdistis ingens is a moth in the family Pterophoridae. It is known from southern Russia, China (Gansu), Mongolia, Tadzhikistan, Kirghistan, Kazakhstan, Uzbekistan, Turkmenistan and Afghanistan.

The wingspan is 32–35 mm.
