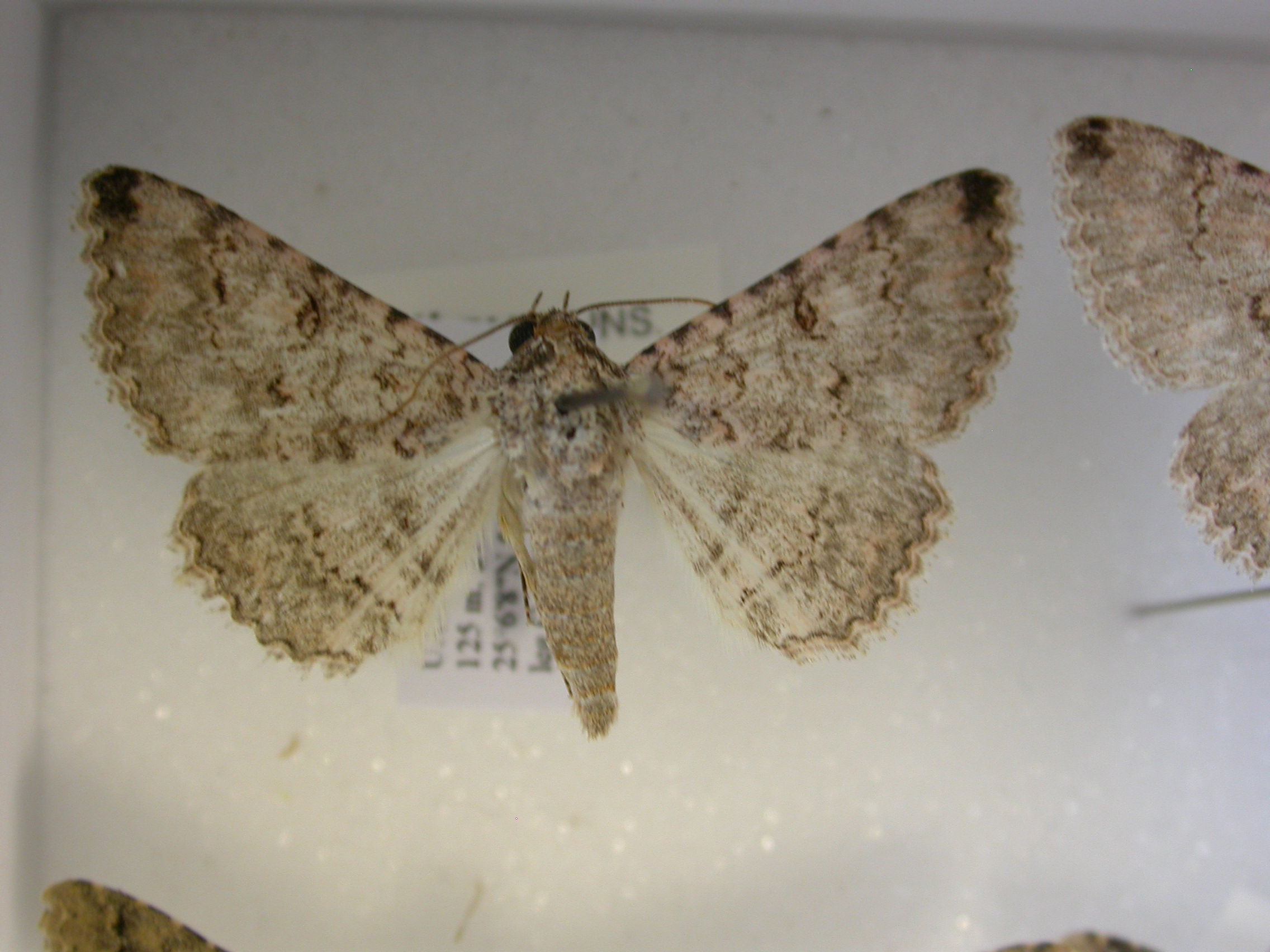
- Heteropalpia acrosticta

Scientific classification
- Kingdom: Animalia
- Phylum: Arthropoda
- Class: Insecta
- Order: Lepidoptera
- Superfamily: Noctuoidea
- Family: Erebidae
- Genus: Heteropalpia
- Species: H. acrosticta

Binomial name
- Heteropalpia acrosticta (Püngeler, 1904)

Synonyms
- Pericyma acrosticta

= Heteropalpia acrosticta =

Species of moth

Heteropalpia acrosticta is a species of moth in the family Erebidae first described by Rudolf Püngeler in 1904. The species is found from the western parts of the Sahara to Israel, Jordan, Egypt and most of the Arabian Peninsula.

Adult males have a wingspan of 31 mm. The female is a little larger.

There are multiple generations per year. Adults are on wing year round.

The larvae feed on Acacia species, including A. geraldi, A. raddiana and A. gummifera.
