= Agdistis tamaricis =

Scientific classification
- Domain: Eukaryota
- Kingdom: Animalia
- Phylum: Arthropoda
- Class: Insecta
- Order: Lepidoptera
- Family: Pterophoridae
- Genus: Agdistis
- Species: A. tamaricis

Binomial name
- Agdistis tamaricis (Zeller, 1847)

Synonyms
- Adactyla tamaricis Zeller, 1847; Agdistis bagdadiensis Amsel, 1949

Species of plume moth

Agdistis tamaricis (tamarisk plume) is a moth of the family Pterophoridae found in Africa, Asia and Europe. It was first described by the German entomologist, Philipp Christoph Zeller in 1847.

== Description ==
The wingspan is 18–27 millimetres (0.71–1.06 in). The moths are similar to other Agdistis species and it is difficult to tell them apart. Adults are on wing from March to October in multiple generations.

The larvae feed on French tamarisk (Tamarix gallica), Tamarix smyrnensis, Tamarix africaana, Tamarix canariensis, salt cedar (Tamarix ramosissima) and Myricaria germanica.

== Distribution ==
In the Palearctic realm, it is found on the Canary Islands and the Mediterranean region. In the north it ranges to southern Germany and Strasbourg in France. Larvae were discovered on Jersey, Channel Islands in August 2006. In the east the range extends through the Balkan Peninsula to Anatolia, Turkmenistan, Iran, Afghanistan, Pakistan and China. In the south it is found in Israel, North Africa and Arabia. In the Oriental region it is found in India, China and Taiwan and in the Afrotropical region in Liberia, South Africa and Mauritania.
