= Agdistis tenera =

Scientific classification
- Domain: Eukaryota
- Kingdom: Animalia
- Phylum: Arthropoda
- Class: Insecta
- Order: Lepidoptera
- Family: Pterophoridae
- Genus: Agdistis
- Species: A. tenera

Binomial name
- Agdistis tenera Arenberger, 1976

Species of plume moth

Agdistis tenera is a moth in the family Pterophoridae. It is known from Iran, Bahrain, the United Arab Emirates and Yemen.
