= Huemer =

Huemer is a surname. Notable people with the surname include:

- Dick Huemer (1898–1979), American animator
- Michael Huemer (born 1969), American philosophy professor
