= Anumeta straminea =

Scientific classification
- Domain: Eukaryota
- Kingdom: Animalia
- Phylum: Arthropoda
- Class: Insecta
- Order: Lepidoptera
- Superfamily: Noctuoidea
- Family: Erebidae
- Genus: Anumeta
- Species: A. straminea

Binomial name
- Anumeta straminea (A. Bang-Haas, 1906)

Species of moth

Anumeta straminea is a moth of the family Erebidae first described by Andreas Bang-Haas in 1906. It is found from the Sahara and the Arabian Desert to Bahrain and northern Oman. Furthermore, it is found in the Arava Valley and the Dead Sea area of Israel.

There are two generations per year in Africa and one in the Middle East. Adults are on wing from December to March.

The larvae feed on Calligonum species.
