= Agdistis olei =

Scientific classification
- Kingdom: Animalia
- Phylum: Arthropoda
- Class: Insecta
- Order: Lepidoptera
- Family: Pterophoridae
- Genus: Agdistis
- Species: A. olei

Binomial name
- Agdistis olei Arenberger, 1976

Species of plume moth

Agdistis olei is a moth in the family Pterophoridae. It is known from Iran, Oman, Bahrain, Saudi Arabia and the United Arab Emirates.
