= Eupithecia tenellata =

Scientific classification
- Domain: Eukaryota
- Kingdom: Animalia
- Phylum: Arthropoda
- Class: Insecta
- Order: Lepidoptera
- Family: Geometridae
- Genus: Eupithecia
- Species: E. tenellata

Binomial name
- Eupithecia tenellata Dietze, 1906

Synonyms
- Tephroclystia gelinaria Lucas, 1907; Eupithecia gelinaria; Tephroclystia deserticola Turati, 1934

Species of moth

Eupithecia tenellata is a moth in the family Geometridae. It is found in North Africa (Algeria, Tunisia), Iran and the Arabian Peninsula (Bahrain, Oman).

== Subspecies ==
- Eupithecia tenellata tenellata
- Eupithecia tenellata perspicuata Schutze, 1961 (Oman)
