= Agdistis caradjai =

Scientific classification
- Kingdom: Animalia
- Phylum: Arthropoda
- Class: Insecta
- Order: Lepidoptera
- Family: Pterophoridae
- Genus: Agdistis
- Species: A. caradjai

Binomial name
- Agdistis caradjai Arenberger, 1975

Synonyms
- Agdistis dagestanica Zagulajev & Filippova, 1976

Species of plume moth

Agdistis caradjai is a moth in the family Pterophoridae. It is known from Turkey, Russia and Iran.
