= Agdistis adenensis =

Scientific classification
- Domain: Eukaryota
- Kingdom: Animalia
- Phylum: Arthropoda
- Class: Insecta
- Order: Lepidoptera
- Family: Pterophoridae
- Genus: Agdistis
- Species: A. adenensis

Binomial name
- Agdistis adenensis Amsel, 1961

Species of plume moth

Agdistis adenensis is a moth in the family Pterophoridae. It is known from Yemen, Oman, Iran and Bahrain.
