= Anumeta spilota =

Scientific classification
- Domain: Eukaryota
- Kingdom: Animalia
- Phylum: Arthropoda
- Class: Insecta
- Order: Lepidoptera
- Superfamily: Noctuoidea
- Family: Erebidae
- Genus: Anumeta
- Species: A. spilota

Binomial name
- Anumeta spilota Erschoff, 1874

Synonyms
- Leucanitis spilota

Species of moth

Anumeta spilota is a moth of the family Erebidae first described by Nikolay Grigoryevich Erschoff in 1874. It is found from the western parts of the Sahara to the Sinai, Israel, central Asia, Pakistan and India.

There is probably one generation per year. Adults are on wing from March to May.

== Subspecies ==
- Anumeta spilota spilota
- Anumeta spilota harterti
- Anumeta spilota mugshinensis
