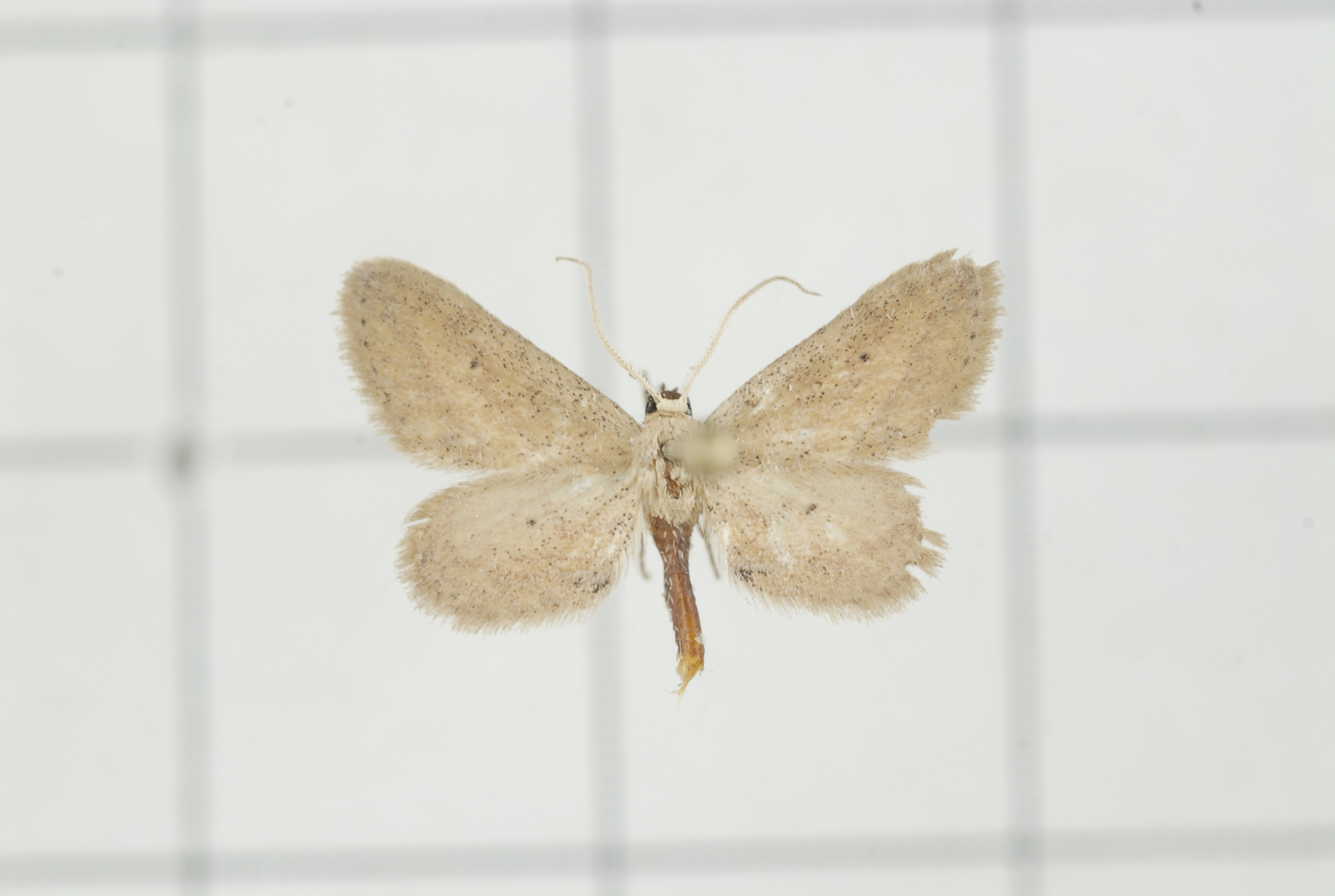

Scientific classification
- Kingdom: Animalia
- Phylum: Arthropoda
- Class: Insecta
- Order: Lepidoptera
- Family: Geometridae
- Genus: Scopula
- Species: S. relictata

Binomial name
- Scopula relictata (Walker, 1866)

Synonyms
- Acidalia relictata Walker, 1866; Zygophyxia relictata; Lycauges demissus Swinhoe, 1886; Sterrha ooptera Turner, 1922

= Scopula relictata =

Species of geometer moth in subfamily Sterrhinae

Scopula relictata is a moth of the family Geometridae. It is found in Kenya, Senegal, the United Arab Emirates, Australia, India, Sri Lanka and Taiwan.
