= Agdistis nanodes =

Scientific classification
- Kingdom: Animalia
- Phylum: Arthropoda
- Class: Insecta
- Order: Lepidoptera
- Family: Pterophoridae
- Genus: Agdistis
- Species: A. nanodes

Binomial name
- Agdistis nanodes Meyrick, 1906

Synonyms
- Agdistis debilis Bigot, 1968; Agdistis sindicola Amsel, 1968

Species of plume moth

Agdistis nanodes is a moth in the family Pterophoridae. It is known from Egypt, Iran, Pakistan, Sri Lanka, Bahrain, Saudi Arabia, the United Arab Emirates, Oman and Yemen.
