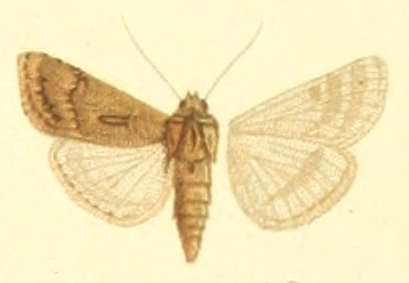
- Female
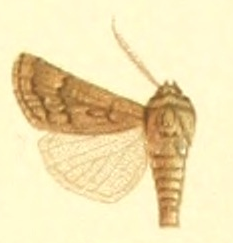
- Male

Scientific classification
- Kingdom: Animalia
- Phylum: Arthropoda
- Clade: Pancrustacea
- Class: Insecta
- Order: Lepidoptera
- Superfamily: Noctuoidea
- Family: Noctuidae
- Genus: Agrotis
- Species: A. lasserrei

Binomial name
- Agrotis lasserrei (Oberthür, 1881)

Synonyms
- Agrotis (Powellinia) lasserei (Oberthür, 1881); Powellinia lasserrei (Oberthür, 1881); Luperina lasserrei Oberthür, 1881; Euxoa lasserrei

= Agrotis lasserrei =

Species of moth

Agrotis lasserrei is a moth of the family Noctuidae. It is widespread throughout most of the eremic zone of the Palearctic realm, from south-east Spain and the western part of the Sahara to Turkmenistan and Iran.

Adults are on wing from October to November. There is one generation per year.
