= Heteropalpia profesta =

Scientific classification
- Kingdom: Animalia
- Phylum: Arthropoda
- Class: Insecta
- Order: Lepidoptera
- Superfamily: Noctuoidea
- Family: Erebidae
- Genus: Heteropalpia
- Species: H. profesta

Binomial name
- Heteropalpia profesta (Christoph, 1887)

Synonyms
- Heteropalpia sacra

Species of moth

Heteropalpia profesta is a moth of the family Noctuidae first described by Hugo Theodor Christoph in 1887. It is found in the Near East, the Middle East, Iraq, Iran, Afghanistan, Transcaucasia, Turkmenistan and the Arabian Peninsula.

There probably are multiple generations per year. Adults are on wing from March to November.

The larvae possibly feed on Acacia species.

== Subspecies ==
- Heteropalpia profesta profesta
- Heteropalpia profesta sacra (Israel)
