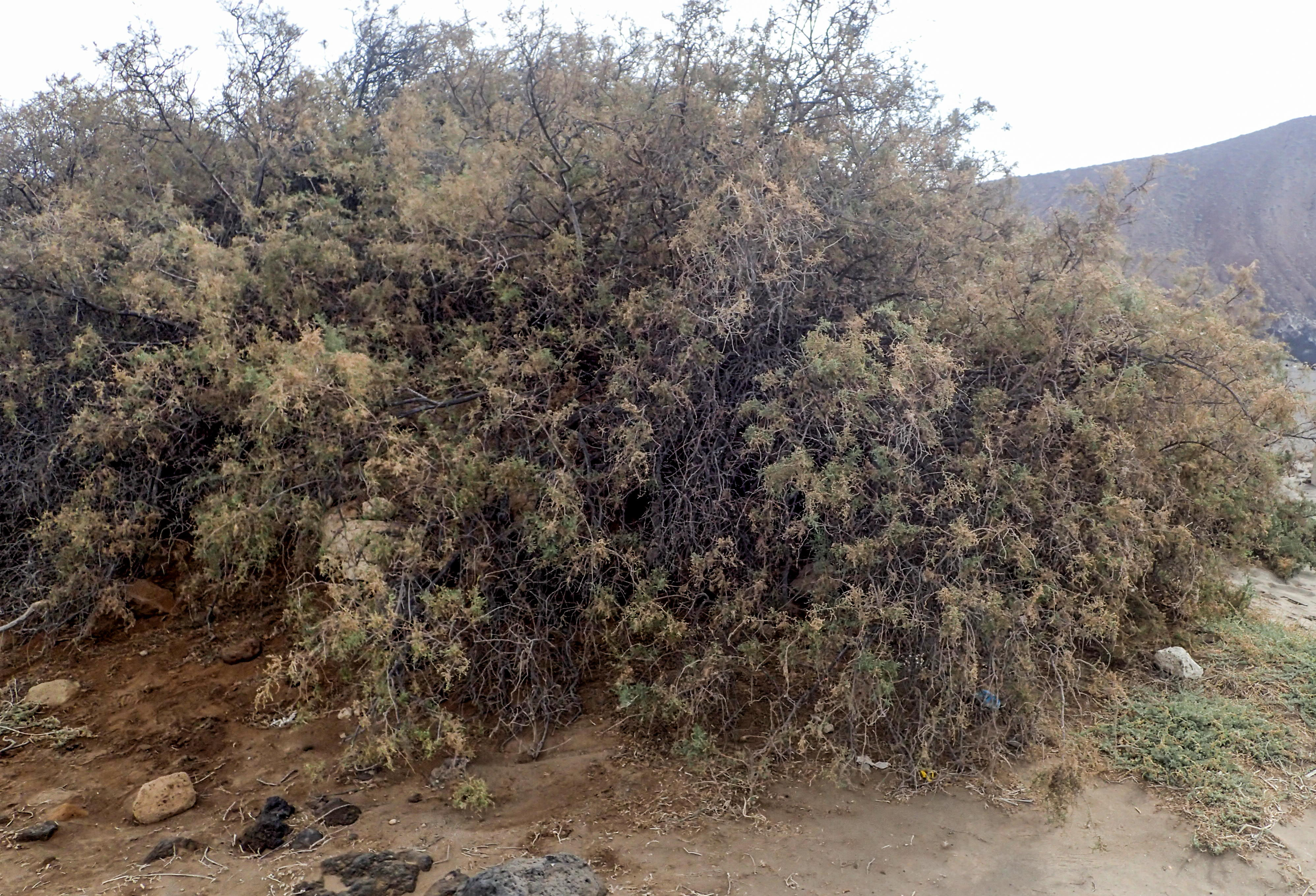
- In habitat, Playa de las Tejitas, Tenerife

Scientific classification
- Kingdom: Plantae
- Clade: Tracheophytes
- Clade: Angiosperms
- Clade: Eudicots
- Order: Caryophyllales
- Family: Tamaricaceae
- Genus: Tamarix
- Species: T. canariensis

Binomial name
- Tamarix canariensis Willd.

Synonyms
- Tamarix gallica var. canariensis (Willd.) Ehrenb.

= Tamarix canariensis =

Species of flowering plant

Tamarix canariensis is a species of flowering plant in the family Tamaricaceae. It is a shrub or small tree up to 4 m tall. It was previously said to be native to parts of Macaronesia, northern Africa and south-western Europe, but is now considered only to be found in the Canary Islands, the African and European species being Tamarix gallica. It was first described by Carl Ludwig Willdenow in 1816.

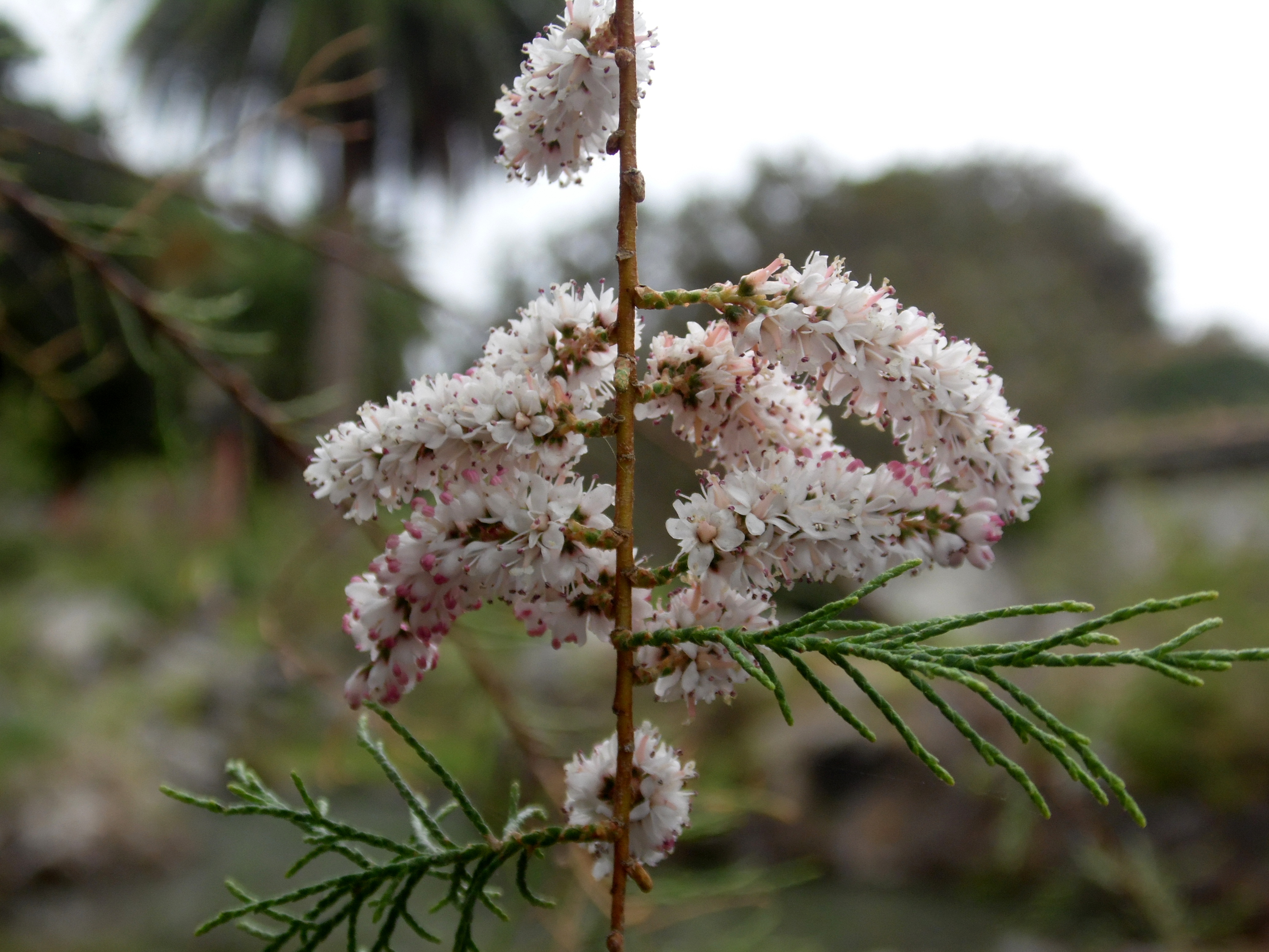
Flowers and foliage

== Distribution and habitat ==
Tamarix canariensis is endemic to the Canary Islands. It is believed to occur on all the islands except for El Hierro. It has been found at elevations of up to about 560 m, although it is more common at lower altitudes, including the sea shore and estuaries. It tolerates some salinity.
