= Agdistis =

Deity of Greek, Roman and Anatolian mythology

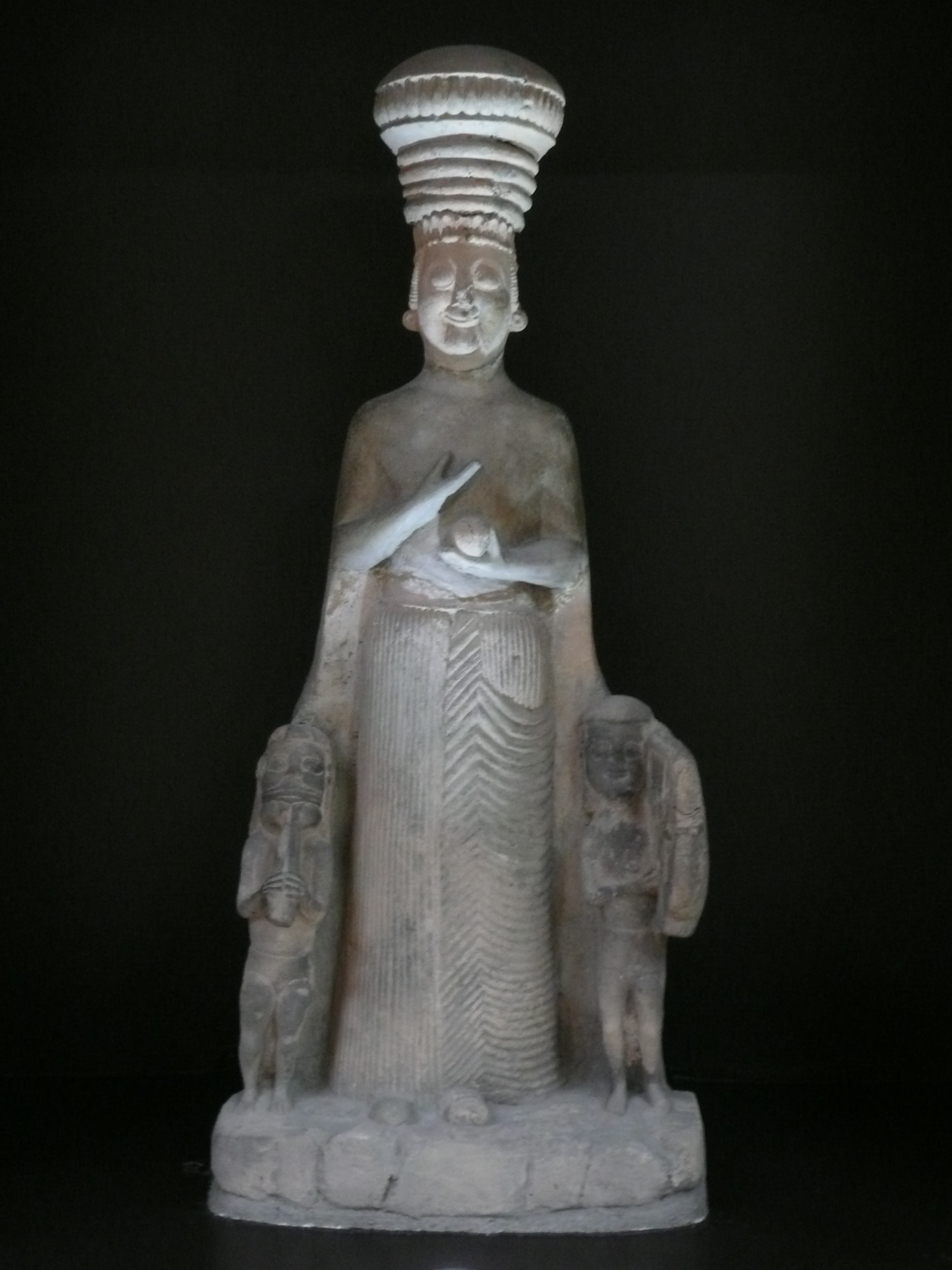
Phrygian statue of Cybele/Agdistis from the mid-6th century BC at or near Hattusa

Agdistis (Ancient Greek: Ἄγδιστις) is a deity of Greek, Roman, and Anatolian mythology who was a hermaphrodite, having been born with both male and female reproductive organs. The deity was closely associated with the Phrygian goddess Cybele.

== Mythology ==
The geographer Pausanias (7.17.10–12) records the following story about Agdistis, which he says the people of Pessinus told. Zeus, while asleep, spilled some of his semen on the earth, which in time gave rise to a deity (δαίμων) with both male and female sexual organs called Agdistis. Now the other gods, afraid of Agdistis, cut off the male genitalia, and from this grew an almond tree. The daughter of the Phrygian river-god Sangarius picked an almond from this tree and placing it in her bosom she became pregnant. She gave birth to a son Attis who was abandoned in the wild. Attis was cared for by a male goat, and grew to be a divinely beautiful youth and Agdistis fell in love with the boy. But Attis was sent to Pessinus to be married to the king's daughter, and when the marriage hymn was sung Agdistis appeared, and driven mad both Attis and the king castrated themselves. Attis died from his wound but Agdistis, repenting for what had been done to Attis, persuaded Zeus that Attis's body should never decay. In another passage (1.4.5), Pausanias tells us that a mountain at Pessinus was called "Mount Agdistis", and that Attis was said to be buried there.

Another much longer version of Agdistis's story, was apparently handed down by Timotheus, an Athenian Eumolpid (c. 300 BC). According to Arnobius, an early fourth-century Christian apologist:

In Timotheus, who was no mean mythologist, and also in others equally well informed, the birth of the Great Mother of the gods, and the origin of her rites, are thus detailed, being derived (as he himself writes and suggests) from learned books of antiquities, and from [his acquaintance with] the most secret mysteries

Arnobius goes on to recount the story as follows. There was a rock in Phrygia called Agdus, from which this Great Mother was fashioned. Now Jupiter (the Roman Zeus) desired to have intercourse with her, but unable to do so, let his seed fall upon the rock. From this rock was eventually born Agdistis, named so after Agdus the mothering rock. In Agdistis was:

resistless might, and a fierceness of disposition beyond control, a lust made furious, and [derived] from both sexes! He violently plundered and laid waste; he scattered destruction wherever the ferocity of his disposition had led him; he regarded not gods or men, nor did he think anything more powerful than himself; he contemned earth, heaven, and the stars.

After the gods, in their councils, had often considered what could be done to curb Agdistis, Liber (the Roman Dionysus), taking the task upon himself, caused Agdistis to become drunk and fall fast asleep. With a snare Liber tied Agdistis's foot to his genitals. When Agdistis finally woke up and stood, he tore his own genitals off. And from these and the immense flow of blood upon the earth grew a pomegranate tree. Now Sangarius's daughter Nana placed one of the fruits from the tree in her bosom, and as above, became pregnant with the boy Attis. When the pregnancy is discovered by her father, Nana is shut up in order to starve her to death. But she is kept alive by the Mother of the gods, Attis is born, and Sangarius orders the child exposed. As before the child is found and nurtured, and grows to be a surpassingly beautiful youth, whom the Mother of the gods loved "exceedingly". And, as Attis grew up, Agdistis was his constant secret companion:

fondling him, and bound [to him] by wicked compliance with his lust in the only way now possible, leading him through the wooded glades, and presenting him with the spoils of many wild beasts, which the boy Attis at first said boastfully were won by his own toil and labour.

Eventually, however, a drunken Attis confesses his relationship with Agdistis, and in order to save the youth from "so disgraceful an intimacy", Midas the king of Pessinus resolves to give Attis his daughter in marriage. On the day of the wedding, Midas has the gates of the city closed, so that nothing might disrupt it. But the Mother of the gods knows Attis' fate and that he would never be safe if he married. So, wishing to prevent the marriage, she "raised" the city "walls with her head" and entered the city. And so too entered Agdistis. In a jealous rage, Agdistis bursts in upon the wedding filling everyone with "frenzied madness" which causes Attis to castrate himself and die. The Mother of the gods gathered up the severed genitals and buried them, and Agdistis and the Mother of the gods join together in the funeral wailings. Agdistis pleads for Jupiter to restore Attis to life. Jupiter refuses, but does grant that Attis' body will never decay, his hair should continue to grow, and his little fingers should live, and ever move. Agdistis took the body to Pessinus, where it was consecrated and honored with yearly rites.

== Association with Cybele ==
Agdistis's story comes from the Phrygian city of Pessinus, a cultic center of Cybele the Great Mother of the gods, where, according to Strabo, the two goddesses were identified. However, even when Agdistis is considered to be distinct from Cybele, such as in Arnobius' account above, the two are closely associated, with Agdistis often being interpreted as a "doublet" or "doubling" of the Great Mother.

Agdistis held a special place in the Phrygian religious traditions surrounding Cybele. The accounts of Agdistis given above revolve around Attis who was the young consort of Cybele and prototype of her eunuch priesthood. And Agdistis's story was a mythic aition, or origin myth, which was supposed to explain why Cybele's priests were eunuchs. Although the Great Mother does not figure directly in Pausanias' account, she figures throughout Arnobius', seemingly in parallel with Agdistis, where they both love Attis, enter the closed city and disrupt the wedding, and join together in mourning his death.

While the two goddesses in Arnobius' account share such things as their intimate relationship with Attis, and their ability to inspire μανία ('mania') in the wedding participants, there are however differences. The most notable difference being Agdistis' androgynous nature.

== Cult ==
Agdistis' main cultic center was apparently the sacred city of Pessinus. From there her cult presumably spread to other places in Anatolia, as well as to Greek islands in the Aegean Sea, mainland Greece, Crimea, and Egypt.

In Anatolia, an inscription from Iconium invokes Agdistis, alongside Apollo and Artemis, as among those gods considered to be "saviors" (the so-called "theoi sōtēres"), and an altar at Sizma represents both Agdistis and the Great Mother. There was also a religious community at Lydian Philadelphia, which enforced a strict moral code, based at a sanctuary of Agdistis (1st century BC). From Sardis, a copy of a 4th-century BC degree forbids the priests of Zeus from attendance at the "mysteries" of Agdistis.

Her name appears on a dedication from the Ancient Greek town of Methymna on the East Aegean island of Lesbos, off the coast of Anatolia, as well as on a marble base (c. 2nd century BC?), found on the mid-Aegean Greek island of Paros.

Evidence of Agdistis' cult is found in mainland Greece, as early as the 4th–3rd centuries BC. A relief of Agdistis and Attis, whose identities are secured by inscription, is found on a marble votive stele (late 4th or early 3rd-century), from the Metroon in the Piraeus the port of ancient Athens (Antikensammlung Berlin SK 1612). It depicts two figures. On the left is a young male figure in oriental dress sitting on a rock facing right. In front of him on the right stands a female figure facing left, holding a tympanum in her left hand down at her side, and offering a cup in her right hand to the youth who holds out his right hand to receive it. The votive dedication reads: "Timothea to Angdistis [an alternate spelling] and Attis on behalf of her children according to command". From a copy of a public decree (1st-century BC?) kept in the Metroon of Athens, we know that she also had a sanctuary of her own at Rhamnous, an ancient Greek city in Attica situated on the coast, overlooking the Euboean Strait.

Her name also appears on a dedication from Panticapaeum, an ancient Greek city on the eastern shore of Crimea, and, in Egypt, in an inscription recording the construction of a naos and its temenos (temple and temple precinct), during the reign of Ptolemy Philadelphus (284–246 BC).

While some of the occurrences of the name "Agdistis" are found together, and in the same context, with the Great Mother (such as in the altar at Sizma) and thus the two goddesses can be assumed to have been considered distinct, most are not. In such cases, where the name is found alone, it is impossible to know whether it was being used as one of the many epithets of the Great Mother, or instead used as a reference to Agdistis as a separate goddess. In either case, it is also unknown to what extant, if any, Agdistis' hermaphroditic nature informed Agdists' cult practice.

There is also epigraphic evidence that Agdistis was considered to be "a goddess with benevolent and healing traits".

== Androgyny ==
Both Pausanias and Arnobius present Agdistis as being born an hermaphrodite, whom the gods caused to be castrated. According to Pausanias this was because the gods were afraid of Agdistis, while Arnobius makes clear this fear was a reaction to Agdistis' androgyny, which produced in him "a fierceness of disposition beyond control, lust made furious", derived "from both sexes!". Agdistis is also intimately associated with the boy Attis, who, like the Agdistis in Arnobius' version, self-castrates. The central theme of these accounts have been taken by some to be "the myth of the primeval Androgyne", a theme also seen to be present in "other Phrygian religious traditions".

Attempts have been made to connect Agdistis to other Phrygian deities who were also androgynous. His name has been conjectured to be the Greek form of the name (possibly Andistis) of an earlier Phrygian divine androgyne.

== Ullikummi ==
Parallels have been seen between Agdistis and the Hurrian monster Ullikummi. The story of Ullikummi is found in a Hittite text called the Song of Ullikummi where, like Agdistis, Ullikummi is born from a rock that has been impregnated by a god, he presents a challenge to the ruling gods, and the gods "cut" him, severing him from his strength. As Walter Burkert has noted, the beginning of the Song of Ullikummi "corresponds nearly sentence for sentence" with the beginning of Arnobius' account (5.5–6) of Agdistis's story:

Burkert's Comparison
Song of Ullikummi	Arnobius	English translation
In the ... a great rock lies ...	inauditae vastitatis petra ...	[Agdus] a rock of unheard-of wildness
He (Kumarbi) slept with the rock ...	(Jupiter) voluptatem in lapidem fudit ...	spent his lust on the stone
she gave birth ... the Rock ... Kumarbi's son ...	Petra concepit, nascitur ... Agdistis	The rock [conceived and Agdistis] is born
"Let him ascend to heaven for kingship! ... Let him attack the Storm god and tear him to pieces ... Let him shoot down all the gods from the sky ...	huic robur invictum et ferocitas animi ... nec praeter se quicquam potentius credere ...	In him there had been resistless might, and a fierceness of disposition ... nor did he think anything more powerful than himself ...
(The Sun-god, The Storm-god, Tašmišu, Ištar, Ea, Enlil meet and deliberate)	Cuius cum audacia quibusnam modis posset ... comprimi saepenumero esset deorum in deliberatione quaesitum,	... it had been often considered in the councils of the gods, by what means it might be possible either to weaken or to curb his audacity,
Ea began to speak ... "Let them bring forth the olden copper knife with which the severed heaven from earth, Let them cut through the feet of Ullikummis."	(Liber inebriates ageists, the monster is laid in fetters), se ... eo quo vir erat privat sexu	he robs himself of his sex

== See also ==
- Aphroditus, the androgynous aspect of the goddess Aphrodite
- Galli, the eunuch priests of the goddess Cybele and her consort Attis in Rome
- Hermaphroditus, the androgynous son of Hermes and Aphrodite
