= List of moths of Kenya =

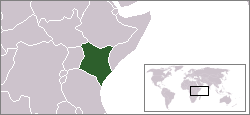
Location of Kenya

There are about 2,100 known moth species of Kenya. The moths (mostly nocturnal) and butterflies (mostly diurnal) together make up the taxonomic order Lepidoptera.

This is a list of moth species which have been recorded in Kenya.

== Alucitidae ==
- Alucita dohertyi (Walsingham, 1909)

== Anomoeotidae ==
- Anomoeotes elegans Pagenstecher, 1903
- Staphylinochrous holotherma Hampson, 1920

== Arctiidae ==
- Acantharctia atriramosa Hampson, 1907
- Acantharctia bivittata (Butler, 1898)
- Acantharctia latifusca (Hampson, 1907)
- Acantharctia metaleuca Hampson, 1901
- Acantharctia nigrivena Rothschild, 1935
- Acantharctia tenuifasciata Hampson, 1910
- Acanthofrontia lithosiana Hampson, 1910
- Afraloa bifurca (Walker, 1855)
- Afrasura hyporhoda (Hampson, 1900)
- Afrasura indecisa (Walker, 1869)
- Afrasura obliterata (Walker, 1864)
- Afrasura peripherica (Strand, 1912)
- Afrasura violacea (Cieslak & Häuser, 2006)
- Afroarctia kenyana (Rothschild, 1933)
- Afrospilarctia lucida (Druce, 1898)
- Aglossosia deceptans Hampson, 1914
- Aglossosia flavimarginata Hampson, 1900
- Alpenus investigatorum (Karsch, 1898)
- Alpenus maculosa (Stoll, 1781)
- Alpenus nigropunctata (Bethune-Baker, 1908)
- Alpenus pardalina (Rothschild, 1910)
- Alpenus schraderi (Rothschild, 1910)
- Amata alicia (Butler, 1876)
- Amata chloroscia (Hampson, 1901)
- Amata cholmlei (Hampson, 1907)
- Amata congener (Hampson, 1901)
- Amata consimilis (Hampson, 1901)
- Amata cuprizonata (Hampson, 1901)
- Amata dissimilis (Bethune-Baker, 1911)
- Amata marinoides Kiriakoff, 1954
- Amata phoenicia (Hampson, 1898)
- Amata rubritincta (Hampson, 1903)
- Amata stenoptera (Zerny, 1912)
- Amata williami Rothschild, 1910
- Amerila affinis (Rothschild, 1910)
- Amerila androfusca (Pinhey, 1952)
- Amerila bipartita (Rothschild, 1910)
- Amerila brunnea (Hampson, 1901)
- Amerila bubo (Walker, 1855)
- Amerila luteibarba (Hampson, 1901)
- Amerila magnifica (Rothschild, 1910)
- Amerila mulleri Häuser & Boppré, 1997
- Amerila niveivitrea (Bartel, 1903)
- Amerila puella (Fabricius, 1793)
- Amerila roseomarginata (Rothschild, 1910)
- Amerila thermochroa (Hampson, 1916)
- Amerila vidua (Cramer, 1780)
- Amerila vitrea Plötz, 1880
- Amphicallia pactolicus (Butler, 1888)
- Amphicallia solai (Druce, 1907)
- Amphicallia thelwalli (Druce, 1882)
- Amsacta melanogastra (Holland, 1897)
- Amsactarctia pulchra (Rothschild, 1933)
- Anaphosia mirabilis (Bartel, 1903)
- Anapisa histrio (Kiriakoff, 1953)
- Anapisa melaleuca (Holland, 1898)
- Anapisa metarctioides (Hampson, 1907)
- Apisa canescens Walker, 1855
- Apisa fontainei Kiriakoff, 1959
- Apisa subargentea Joicey & Talbot, 1921
- Archilema dentata Kühne, 2007
- Archilema modiolus (Kiriakoff, 1958)
- Archilema nivea Kühne, 2007
- Archilema uelleburgensis (Strand, 1912)
- Argina amanda (Boisduval, 1847)
- Asura friederikeae Kühne, 2007
- Asura gubunica (Holland, 1893)
- Asura mutabilis Kühne, 2007
- Asura naumanni Kühne, 2005
- Asura pectinella Strand, 1922
- Asura spinata Kühne, 2007
- Asura spurrelli (Hampson, 1914)
- Asurgylla collenettei Kiriakoff, 1958
- Automolis pallida (Hampson, 1901)
- Balacra compsa (Jordan, 1904)
- Balacra flavimacula Walker, 1856
- Balacra preussi (Aurivillius, 1904)
- Balacra pulchra Aurivillius, 1892
- Balacra rattrayi (Rothschild, 1910)
- Balacra rubricincta Holland, 1893
- Balacra rubrostriata (Aurivillius, 1892)
- Binna penicillata Walker, 1865
- Carcinarctia laeliodes Hampson, 1916
- Carcinarctia metamelaena Hampson, 1901
- Caripodia fuscicincta Hampson, 1914
- Caripodia persimilis Hampson, 1914
- Ceryx crawshayi Hampson, 1901
- Ceryx semihyalina Kirby, 1896
- Cragia adiastola (Kiriakoff, 1958)
- Cragia distigmata (Hampson, 1901)
- Cragia quadrinotata (Walker, 1864)
- Creatonotos leucanioides Holland, 1893
- Ctenosia nephelistis Hampson, 1918
- Cyana bigutta Karisch, 2005
- Cyana flammeostrigata Karisch, 2003
- Cyana margarethae (Kiriakoff, 1958)
- Cyana pretoriae (Distant, 1897)
- Cyana rejecta (Walker, 1854)
- Cyana ugandana (Strand, 1912)
- Diota rostrata (Wallengren, 1860)
- Disparctia vittata (Druce, 1898)
- Eilema aurantisquamata (Hampson, 1918)
- Eilema creatoplaga (Hampson, 1901)
- Eilema debilissima Kiriakoff, 1958
- Eilema flavibasis Hampson, 1900
- Eilema gracilipennis (Wallengren, 1860)
- Eilema intermixta Kühne, 2007
- Eilema leia (Hampson, 1901)
- Eilema marwitziana Strand, 1912
- Eilema melasonea Hampson, 1903
- Eilema mesosticta Hampson, 1911
- Eilema peperita (Hampson, 1901)
- Eilema polioplaga (Hampson, 1901)
- Eilema rufofasciata (Rothschild, 1912)
- Eilema sanguicosta (Hampson, 1901)
- Eilema tegudentata Kühne, 2007
- Epitoxis albicincta Hampson, 1903
- Epitoxis ansorgei Rothschild, 1910
- Epitoxis procridia Hampson, 1898
- Estigmene acrea (Drury, 1773)
- Estigmene ansorgei Rothschild, 1910
- Estigmene atrifascia (Hampson, 1907)
- Estigmene multivittata Rothschild, 1910
- Estigmene ochreomarginata Bethune-Baker, 1909
- Estigmene tenuistrigata (Hampson, 1900)
- Estigmene trivitta (Walker, 1855)
- Euchromia amoena (Möschler, 1872)
- Euchromia folletii (Guérin-Méneville, 1832)
- Eugoa corniculata Kühne, 2007
- Eugoa coronaria Kühne, 2007
- Eurozonosia atricincta Hampson, 1918
- Eurozonosia fulvinigra Hampson, 1914
- Exilisia contrasta Kühne, 2007
- Exilisia friederikeae Kühne, 2007
- Exilisia gablerinus Kühne, 2008
- Exilisia kruegeri Kühne, 2007
- Exilisia prominentia Kühne, 2007
- Eyralpenus scioana (Oberthür, 1880)
- Galtara aurivilii (Pagenstecher, 1901)
- Galtara elongata (Swinhoe, 1907)
- Hippurarctia ferrigera (Druce, 1910)
- Ilemodes astriga Hampson, 1916
- Ischnarctia cinerea (Pagenstecher, 1903)
- Kiriakoffalia costimacula (Joicey & Talbot, 1924)
- Lepidilema unipectinata Aurivillius, 1910
- Lepista pandula (Boisduval, 1847)
- Macrosia chalybeata Hampson, 1901
- Mecistorhabdia haematoessa (Holland, 1893)
- Meganaclia sippia (Plötz, 1880)
- Metarctia benitensis Holland, 1893
- Metarctia flavicincta Aurivillius, 1900
- Metarctia flavivena Hampson, 1901
- Metarctia fulvia Hampson, 1901
- Metarctia fusca Hampson, 1901
- Metarctia haematica Holland, 1893
- Metarctia haematricha Hampson, 1905
- Metarctia hypomela Kiriakoff, 1956
- Metarctia inconspicua Holland, 1892
- Metarctia lateritia Herrich-Schäffer, 1855
- Metarctia paremphares Holland, 1893
- Metarctia rubripuncta Hampson, 1898
- Metarctia rufescens Walker, 1855
- Metarctia sarcosoma Hampson, 1901
- Metarctia schoutedeni Kiriakoff, 1953
- Metarctia subpallens Kiriakoff, 1956
- Metarctia unicolor (Oberthür, 1880)
- Micralarctia punctulatum (Wallengren, 1860)
- Muxta xanthopa (Holland, 1893)
- Nanna collinsii Kühne, 2007
- Nanna eningae (Plötz, 1880)
- Nanna naumanni Kühne, 2005
- Neuroxena ansorgei Kirby, 1896
- Nyctemera apicalis (Walker, 1854)
- Nyctemera glauce (Fawcett, 1916)
- Nyctemera itokina (Aurivillius, 1904)
- Nyctemera leuconoe Hopffer, 1857
- Nyctemera rattrayi (Swinhoe, 1904)
- Nyctemera restrictum (Butler, 1894)
- Ochrota unicolor (Hopffer, 1857)
- Onychipodia nigricostata (Butler, 1894)
- Ovenna guineacola (Strand, 1912)
- Palaeosiccia honeyi Kühne, 2007
- Palaeosiccia punctata Hampson, 1900
- Paralacydes arborifera (Butler, 1875)
- Paralacydes bivittata (Bartel, 1903)
- Paralacydes decemmaculata (Rothschild, 1916)
- Paralacydes fiorii (Berio, 1937)
- Paralacydes minorata (Berio, 1935)
- Paralpenus flavicosta (Hampson, 1909)
- Paralpenus ugandae (Hampson, 1916)
- Paramaenas nephelistis (Hampson, 1907)
- Paramaenas strigosus Grünberg, 1911
- Paremonia argentata Hampson, 1914
- Pericaliella melanodisca (Hampson, 1907)
- Phryganopsis angulifascia (Strand, 1912)
- Phryganopsis kinuthiae Kühne, 2007
- Phryganopsis parasordida Kühne, 2007
- Phryganopsis punctilineata (Hampson, 1901)
- Phryganopsis tryphosa Kiriakoff, 1958
- Popoudina linea (Walker, 1855)
- Popoudina pamphilia Kiriakoff, 1958
- Pseudlepista holoxantha Hampson, 1918
- Pseudodiptera alberici (Dufrane, 1945)
- Pseudonaclia bifasciata Aurivillius, 1910
- Pseudonaclia puella (Boisduval, 1847)
- Pseudothyretes erubescens (Hampson, 1901)
- Pseudothyretes kamitugensis (Dufrane, 1945)
- Pseudothyretes nigrita (Kiriakoff, 1961)
- Pseudothyretes perpusilla (Walker, 1856)
- Pseudothyretes rubicundula (Strand, 1912)
- Pusiola chota (Swinhoe, 1885)
- Pusiola minutissima (Kiriakoff, 1958)
- Pusiola ochreata (Hampson, 1901)
- Pusiola poliosia (Kiriakoff, 1958)
- Pusiola roscidella (Kiriakoff, 1954)
- Pusiola sorghicolor (Kiriakoff, 1954)
- Pusiola straminea (Hampson, 1901)
- Pusiola tinaeella (Kiriakoff, 1958)
- Radiarctia jacksoni (Rothschild, 1910)
- Radiarctia lutescens (Walker, 1854)
- Radiarctia rhodesiana (Hampson, 1900)
- Rhabdomarctia rubrilineata (Bethune-Baker, 1911)
- Rhipidarctia crameri Kiriakoff, 1961
- Rhipidarctia forsteri (Kiriakoff, 1953)
- Rhipidarctia pareclecta (Holland, 1893)
- Secusio strigata Walker, 1854
- Seydelia ellioti (Butler, 1895)
- Siccia adiaphora Kiriakoff, 1958
- Siccia anserina Kühne, 2007
- Siccia chogoriae Kühne, 2007
- Siccia conformis Hampson, 1914
- Siccia cretata Hampson, 1914
- Siccia duodecimpunctata Kiriakoff, 1958
- Siccia elgona Kühne, 2007
- Siccia grossagranularis Kühne, 2007
- Siccia gypsia Hampson, 1914
- Siccia margopuncta Kühne, 2007
- Siccia melanospila Hampson, 1911
- Siccia orbiculata Kühne, 2007
- Siccia pallidata Kühne, 2007
- Siccia rarita Kühne, 2007
- Siccia ursulae Kühne, 2007
- Siccia yvonneae Kühne, 2007
- Spilosoma atridorsia Hampson, 1920
- Spilosoma baxteri (Rothschild, 1910)
- Spilosoma bipartita Rothschild, 1933
- Spilosoma clasnaumanni Kühne, 2005
- Spilosoma curvilinea Walker, 1855
- Spilosoma lineata Walker, 1855
- Spilosoma nyasana Rothschild, 1933
- Spilosoma pales (Druce, 1910)
- Spilosoma rava (Druce, 1898)
- Spilosoma sublutescens Kiriakoff, 1958
- Spilosoma sulphurea Bartel, 1903
- Spilosoma unipuncta (Hampson, 1905)
- Stenarctia abdominalis Rothschild, 1910
- Stenarctia quadripunctata Aurivillius, 1900
- Teracotona abyssinica (Rothschild, 1933)
- Teracotona alicia (Hampson, 1911)
- Teracotona approximans (Rothschild, 1917)
- Teracotona clara Holland, 1892
- Teracotona jacksoni (Rothschild, 1910)
- Teracotona melanocera (Hampson, 1920)
- Teracotona pardalina Bartel, 1903
- Teracotona pitmanni Rothschild, 1933
- Teracotona rhodophaea (Walker, 1865)
- Teracotona subterminata Hampson, 1901
- Thumatha africana Kühne, 2007
- Thumatha kakamegae Kühne, 2007
- Utetheisa amhara Jordan, 1939
- Utetheisa pulchella (Linnaeus, 1758)
- Zobida trinitas (Strand, 1912)

== Autostichidae ==
- Autosticha euryterma Meyrick, 1920

== Bombycidae ==
- Racinoa obliquisigna (Hampson, 1910)
- Racinoa spiralis Kühne, 2008
- Racinoa versicolora Kühne, 2008
- Racinoa zolotuhini Kühne, 2008
- Vingerhoedtia ruficollis (Strand, 1910)

== Brahmaeidae ==
- Dactyloceras lucina (Drury, 1872)
- Dactyloceras neumayeri (Pagenstecher, 1885)
- Dactyloceras noellae Bouyer, 2006
- Dactyloceras ocelligera (Butler, 1889)

== Carposinidae ==
- Carposina mesospila Meyrick, 1920

== Choreutidae ==
- Anthophila massaicae Agassiz, 2008
- Trichocirca tyrota Meyrick, 1920

== Coleophoridae ==
- Blastobasis acirfa Adamski, 2010
- Blastobasis aynekiella Adamski, 2010
- Blastobasis catappaella Adamski, 2010
- Blastobasis chuka Adamski, 2010
- Blastobasis elgonae Adamski, 2010
- Blastobasis glauconotata Adamski, 2010
- Blastobasis kenya Adamski, 2010
- Blastobasis millicentae Adamski, 2010
- Blastobasis mpala Adamski, 2010
- Coleophora enchitis Meyrick, 1920
- Neoblastobasis laikipiae Adamski, 2010
- Neoblastobasis perisella Adamski, 2010
- Neoblastobasis wangithiae Adamski, 2010
- Neoblastobasis ximeniaella Adamski, 2010

== Copromorphidae ==
- Rhynchoferella hoppei Mey, 2007
- Rhynchoferella kuehnei Mey, 2007

== Cosmopterigidae ==
- Gisilia conformata (Meyrick, 1921)
- Gisilia sclerodes (Meyrick, 1909)
- Gisilia stereodoxa (Meyrick, 1925)

== Cossidae ==
- Nomima chloroptera (Meyrick, 1920)
- Strigocossus capensis (Walker, 1856)

== Crambidae ==
- Adelpherupa albescens Hampson, 1919
- Adelpherupa flavescens Hampson, 1919
- Aethaloessa floridalis (Zeller, 1852)
- Agathodes musivalis Guenée, 1854
- Alphacrambus prodontellus (Hampson, 1919)
- Analyta vansomereni Tams, 1932
- Anania mesophaealis (Hampson, 1913)
- Anania phaeopastalis (Hampson, 1913)
- Anania piperitalis (Hampson, 1913)
- Ancylolomia atrifasciata Hampson, 1919
- Ancylolomia capensis Zeller, 1852
- Ancylolomia chrysographellus (Kollar, 1844)
- Ancylolomia croesus Hampson, 1919
- Ancylolomia perfasciata Hampson, 1919
- Ancylolomia planicosta Martin, 1956
- Brihaspa chrysostomus (Zeller, 1852)
- Cadarena sinuata (Fabricius, 1781)
- Caffrocrambus undilineatus (Hampson, 1919)
- Calamotropha niveicostellus (Hampson, 1919)
- Charltona argyrastis Hampson, 1919
- Chilo argyrogramma (Hampson, 1919)
- Chilo flavirufalis (Hampson, 1919)
- Chilo orichalcociliella (Strand, 1911)
- Cotachena smaragdina (Butler, 1875)
- Crambus acyperas Hampson, 1919
- Crambus hampsoni Błeszyński, 1961
- Crambus tessellatus Hampson, 1919
- Donacaula rufalis (Hampson, 1919)
- Epichilo irroralis (Hampson, 1919)
- Euchromius labellum Schouten, 1988
- Euclasta gigantalis Viette, 1957
- Glaucobotys spiniformis Maes, 2008
- Glyphodes capensis (Walker, 1866)
- Goniophysetis lactealis Hampson, 1916
- Hendecasis apicefulva Hampson, 1916
- Hendecasis fulviplaga Hampson, 1916
- Lamprophaia ablactalis (Walker, 1859)
- Lamprosema ommatalis (Hampson, 1912)
- Lygropia amyntusalis (Walker, 1859)
- Nausinoe geometralis (Guenée, 1854)
- Nomophila noctuella ([Denis & Schiffermüller], 1775)
- Orphanostigma abruptalis (Walker, 1859)
- Palpita phaealis (Hampson, 1913)
- Palpita stenocraspis (Butler, 1898)
- Parapoynx diminutalis (Snellen, 1880)
- Parerupa africana (Aurivillius, 1910)
- Patissa atrilinealis Hampson, 1919
- Patissa fractilinealis Hampson, 1919
- Patissa geminalis Hampson, 1919
- Powysia rosealinea Maes, 2006
- Prionapteryx albescens (Hampson, 1919)
- Prionapteryx alternalis Maes, 2002
- Prionapteryx ochrifasciata (Hampson, 1919)
- Prionapteryx rubrifusalis (Hampson, 1919)
- Prochoristis calamochroa (Hampson, 1919)
- Pycnarmon cribrata (Fabricius, 1794)
- Pyrausta bostralis (Hampson, 1919)
- Pyrausta centralis Maes, 2009
- Pyrausta diatoma Hampson, 1913
- Pyrausta flavimarginalis (Hampson, 1913)
- Pyrausta haematidalis Hampson, 1913
- Pyrausta perfervidalis Hampson, 1913
- Pyrausta sanguifusalis Hampson, 1913
- Pyrausta sthenialis Hampson, 1916
- Syllepte attenualis (Hampson, 1912)
- Udeoides muscosalis (Hampson, 1913)
- Udeoides nigribasalis (Hampson, 1913)
- Udeoides nolalis (Felder & Rogenhofer, 1875)
- Udeoides viridis Maes, 2006
- Zebronia phenice (Cramer, 1780)

== Drepanidae ==
- Epicampoptera andersoni (Tams, 1925)
- Epicampoptera marantica (Tams, 1930)
- Gonoreta subtilis (Bryk, 1913)

== Elachistidae ==
- Elachista brevis Sruoga & De Prins, 2009
- Elachista chelonitis Meyrick, 1909
- Elachista kakamegensis Sruoga & De Prins, 2009
- Elachista longispina Sruoga & De Prins, 2009
- Elachista planca Sruoga & De Prins, 2009
- Ethmia argomicta Meyrick, 1920
- Ethmia ballistis Meyrick, 1908
- Ethmia bicolorella (Guenée, 1879)
- Ethmia cirrhosoma Meyrick, 1920
- Ethmia ditreta Meyrick, 1920
- Ethmia epiloxa Meyrick, 1914
- Ethmia glabra Meyrick, 1920
- Ethmia hemicosma Meyrick, 1920
- Ethmia melanocrates Meyrick, 1923
- Perittia falciferella Sruoga & De Prins, 2009
- Perittia gnoma Sruoga & De Prins, 2009
- Perittia spatulata Sruoga & De Prins, 2009
- Perittia tantilla Sruoga & De Prins, 2009
- Sphecodora porphyrias Meyrick, 1920

== Eupterotidae ==
- Acrojana scutaea Strand, 1909
- Hoplojana rhodoptera (Gerstaecker, 1871)
- Hoplojana roseobrunnea Rothschild, 1917
- Jana eurymas Herrich-Schäffer, 1854
- Jana fletcheri Berger, 1980
- Jana germana Rothschild, 1917
- Jana preciosa Aurivillius, 1893
- Parajana gabunica (Aurivillius, 1892)
- Phiala parabiota Kühne, 2007
- Stenoglene obtusus (Walker, 1864)
- Stenoglene preussi (Aurivillius, 1893)
- Stenoglene roseus (Druce, 1886)
- Stenoglene sulphureoides Kühne, 2007
- Vianga crowleyi (Aurivillius, 1904)

== Galacticidae ==
- Homadaula watamomaritima Mey, 2007

== Gelechiidae ==
- Anarsia agricola Walsingham, 1891
- Anarsia arsenopa Meyrick, 1920
- Chilopselaphus ethicodes Meyrick, 1920
- Deltophora angulella Sattler, 1979
- Deltophora diversella Sattler, 1979
- Encolpotis scioplasta Meyrick, 1920
- Gelechia crudescens Meyrick, 1920
- Hypatima mangiferae Sattler, 1989
- Parallactis plaesiodes (Meyrick, 1920)
- Sphenogrypa syncosma Meyrick, 1920
- Telphusa microsperma Meyrick, 1920
- Telphusa phaulosema Meyrick, 1920
- Thiognatha metachalca Meyrick, 1920
- Trichotaphe melanosoma Meyrick, 1920

== Geometridae ==
- Acanthovalva inconspicuaria (Hübner, 1796)
- Acidaliastis bicurvifera Prout, 1916
- Acidaliastis micra Hampson, 1896
- Acidaliastis subbrunnescens Prout, 1916
- Acrostatheusis atomaria (Warren, 1901)
- Allochrostes impunctata (Warren, 1897)
- Antharmostes papilio Prout, 1912
- Aphilopota calaria (Swinhoe, 1904)
- Aphilopota cardinalli Prout, 1954
- Aphilopota confusata (Warren, 1902)
- Aphilopota cydno Prout, 1954
- Aphilopota dicampsis Prout, 1934
- Aphilopota nubilata Prout, 1954
- Aphilopota ochrimacula (Warren, 1902)
- Aphilopota rufiplaga (Warren, 1902)
- Aphilopota semiusta (Distant, 1898)
- Aplochlora pseudossa Prout, 1932
- Archichlora jacksoni Carcasson, 1971
- Ascotis reciprocaria (Walker, 1860)
- Asthenotricha amblycoma Prout, 1935
- Asthenotricha anisobapta Prout, 1932
- Asthenotricha ansorgei Warren, 1899
- Asthenotricha dentatissima Warren, 1899
- Asthenotricha flavicoma Warren, 1899
- Asthenotricha inutilis Warren, 1901
- Asthenotricha pycnoconia Janse, 1933
- Asthenotricha semidivisa Warren, 1901
- Asthenotricha serraticornis Warren, 1902
- Asthenotricha straba Prout, 1921
- Asthenotricha strangulata Herbulot, 1953
- Asthenotricha unipecten (Prout, 1915)
- Biston abruptaria (Walker, 1869)
- Biston gloriosaria Karisch, 2005
- Biston pteronyma (Prout, 1938)
- Cabera andrica Prout, 1932
- Cabera pictilinea (Warren, 1902)
- Caradrinopsis obscuraria Swinhoe, 1904
- Cartaletis libyssa (Hopffer, 1857)
- Casilda lucidaria (Swinhoe, 1904)
- Casuariclystis latifascia (Walker, 1866)
- Centrochria unipunctata Gaede, 1917
- Chiasmia amarata (Guenée, 1858)
- Chiasmia assimilis (Warren, 1899)
- Chiasmia ate (Prout, 1926)
- Chiasmia baringensis Agassiz, 2009
- Chiasmia brongusaria (Walker, 1860)
- Chiasmia butaria (Swinhoe, 1904)
- Chiasmia cararia (Swinhoe, 1904)
- Chiasmia contaminata (Warren, 1902)
- Chiasmia costiguttata (Warren, 1899)
- Chiasmia featheri (Prout, 1922)
- Chiasmia feraliata (Guenée, 1858)
- Chiasmia fulvimargo (Warren, 1899)
- Chiasmia geminilinea (Prout, 1932)
- Chiasmia inconspicua (Warren, 1897)
- Chiasmia maculosa (Warren, 1899)
- Chiasmia majestica (Warren, 1901)
- Chiasmia marmorata (Warren, 1897)
- Chiasmia nubilata (Warren, 1897)
- Chiasmia obliquilineata (Warren, 1899)
- Chiasmia olindaria (Swinhoe, 1904)
- Chiasmia procidata (Guenée, 1858)
- Chiasmia semialbida (Prout, 1915)
- Chiasmia sororcula (Warren, 1897)
- Chiasmia subcurvaria (Mabille, 1897)
- Chiasmia sufflata (Guenée, 1858)
- Chiasmia trinotata (Warren, 1902)
- Chiasmia trizonaria (Hampson, 1909)
- Chiasmia umbrata (Warren, 1897)
- Chiasmia umbratilis (Butler, 1875)
- Chiasmia velia Agassiz, 2009
- Chiasmia warreni (Prout, 1915)
- Chiasmia zelota Prout, 1922
- Chlorerythra rubriplaga Warren, 1895
- Chlorissa attenuata (Walker, 1862)
- Chlorissa dialeuca Prout, 1930
- Chlorissa malescripta (Warren, 1897)
- Chloroclystis consocer Prout, 1937
- Chloroclystis grisea Warren, 1897
- Chloroclystis muscosa (Warren, 1902)
- Chloroclystis schoenei Karisch, 2008
- Chlorodrepana cryptochroma Prout, 1913
- Chrysocraspeda leighata Warren, 1904
- Cleora munda (Warren, 1899)
- Cleora thyris D. S. Fletcher, 1967
- Cleora tulbaghata (Felder & Rogenhofer, 1875)
- Coenina aurivena Butler, 1898
- Collix foraminata Guenée, 1858
- Colocleora bipannosa Prout, 1938
- Colocleora proximaria (Walker, 1860)
- Comibaena leucospilata (Walker, 1863)
- Comostolopsis coerulea Warren, 1902
- Comostolopsis simplex Warren, 1902
- Conchylia interstincta (Prout, 1923)
- Conolophia persimilis (Warren, 1905)
- Conolophia rectistrigaria Rebel, 1914
- Ctenaulis albirupta Warren, 1902
- Cyclophora lyciscaria (Guenée, 1857)
- Derambila hyperphyes (Prout, 1911)
- Derambila iridoptera (Prout, 1913)
- Derambila jacksoni Prout, 1915
- Disclisioprocta natalata (Walker, 1862)
- Discomiosis anfractilinea Prout, 1915
- Discomiosis synnephes Prout, 1915
- Dithecodes delicata (Warren, 1899)
- Dithecodes ornithospila (Prout, 1911)
- Drepanogynis cambogiaria (Guenée, 1858)
- Drepanogynis somereni (Prout, 1926)
- Dysrhoe olbia (Prout, 1911)
- Dysrhoe rhiogyra (Prout, 1932)
- Ecpetala animosa Prout, 1935
- Ecpetala carnifasciata (Warren, 1899)
- Ecpetala indentata (Warren, 1902)
- Ecpetala obtusa (Warren, 1902)
- Ectropis delosaria (Walker, 1862)
- Ectropis ocellata Warren, 1902
- Encoma irisaria Swinhoe, 1904
- Encoma pulviscula Prout, 1932
- Eois alticola (Aurivillius, 1925)
- Eois diapsis Prout, 1932
- Eois grataria (Walker, 1861)
- Epigynopteryx ansorgei (Warren, 1901)
- Epigynopteryx coffeae Prout, 1934
- Epigynopteryx commixta Warren, 1901
- Epigynopteryx flavedinaria (Guenée, 1857)
- Epigynopteryx mutabilis (Warren, 1903)
- Epirrhoe annulifera (Warren, 1902)
- Episteira frustrata Prout, 1935
- Erastria albosignata (Walker, 1863)
- Erastria leucicolor (Butler, 1875)
- Erastria madecassaria (Boisduval, 1833)
- Eretmopus anadyomene (Townsend, 1952)
- Eretmopus nereis (Townsend, 1952)
- Ereunetea reussi Gaede, 1914
- Eucrostes disparata Walker, 1861
- Eupithecia albistillata Prout, 1932
- Eupithecia amphiplex Prout, 1932
- Eupithecia anguinata (Warren, 1902)
- Eupithecia atomaria (Warren, 1902)
- Eupithecia candicans Herbulot, 1988
- Eupithecia celatisigna (Warren, 1902)
- Eupithecia devestita (Warren, 1899)
- Eupithecia dilucida (Warren, 1899)
- Eupithecia dohertyi Prout, 1935
- Eupithecia ecplyta Prout, 1932
- Eupithecia gradatilinea Prout, 1916
- Eupithecia hemiochra Prout, 1932
- Eupithecia immensa (Warren, 1902)
- Eupithecia isotenes Prout, 1932
- Eupithecia jeanneli Herbulot, 1953
- Eupithecia mecodaedala Prout, 1932
- Eupithecia medilunata Prout, 1932
- Eupithecia mendosaria (Swinhoe, 1904)
- Eupithecia nigribasis (Warren, 1902)
- Eupithecia oblongipennis (Warren, 1902)
- Eupithecia orbaria (Swinhoe, 1904)
- Eupithecia perculsaria (Swinhoe, 1904)
- Eupithecia picturata (Warren, 1902)
- Eupithecia proflua Prout, 1932
- Eupithecia psiadiata Townsend, 1952
- Eupithecia regulosa (Warren, 1902)
- Eupithecia resarta Prout, 1932
- Eupithecia rigida Swinhoe, 1892
- Eupithecia rubristigma Prout, 1932
- Eupithecia semiflavata (Warren, 1902)
- Eupithecia semipallida Janse, 1933
- Eupithecia tabacata D. S. Fletcher, 1951
- Eupithecia tetraglena Prout, 1932
- Eupithecia undiculata Prout, 1932
- Exeliopsis tholera (Prout, 1932)
- Gonanticlea meridionata (Walker, 1862)
- Gymnoscelis acutipennis Warren, 1902
- Gymnoscelis birivulata Warren, 1902
- Gymnoscelis carneata Warren, 1902
- Hemicopsis purpuraria Swinhoe, 1904
- Hemidromodes unicolorata Hausmann, 1996
- Heterorachis haploa (Prout, 1912)
- Heterostegane minutissima (Swinhoe, 1904)
- Hierochthonia migrata Prout, 1930
- Horisme pallidimacula Prout, 1925
- Hydrelia argyridia (Butler, 1894)
- Hypomecis assimilis (Warren, 1902)
- Idaea fylloidaria (Swinhoe, 1904)
- Idaea laciniata (Warren, 1902)
- Idaea lalasaria (Swinhoe, 1904)
- Idaea lilliputaria (Warren, 1902)
- Idaea macrostyla (Warren, 1900)
- Idaea minimaria (Warren, 1904)
- Idaea parallelaria (Warren, 1902)
- Idaea pulveraria (Snellen, 1872)
- Idaea subscutulata (Warren, 1899)
- Idaea tornivestis (Prout, 1932)
- Idaea umbricosta (Prout, 1913)
- Idiochlora approximans (Warren, 1897)
- Idiochlora subrufibasis (Prout, 1930)
- Idiodes flexilinea (Warren, 1898)
- Isoplenodia arabukoensis Sihvonen & Staude, 2010
- Isturgia catalaunaria (Guenée, 1858)
- Isturgia deerraria (Walker, 1861)
- Isturgia disputaria (Guenée, 1858)
- Isturgia exerraria (Prout, 1925)
- Isturgia exospilata (Walker, 1861)
- Isturgia presbitaria (Swinhoe, 1904)
- Isturgia pulinda (Walker, 1860)
- Isturgia quadriplaga (Rothschild, 1921)
- Lasiochlora bicolor (Thierry-Mieg, 1907)
- Leucoxena lactea Warren, 1900
- Lobidiopteryx veninotata Warren, 1902
- Lomographa aridata (Warren, 1897)
- Lomographa indularia (Guenée, 1858)
- Lophorrhachia burdoni Townsend, 1958
- Lycaugidia albatus (Swinhoe, 1885)
- Melinoessa amplissimata (Walker, 1863)
- Melinoessa pauper Warren, 1901
- Menophra obtusata (Warren, 1902)
- Menophra olginaria (Swinhoe, 1904)
- Mesocoela obscura Warren, 1902
- Mesocolpia lita (Prout, 1916)
- Mesocolpia nanula (Mabille, 1900)
- Mesocolpia protrusata (Warren, 1902)
- Microloxia ruficornis Warren, 1897
- Milocera divorsa Prout, 1922
- Milocera podocarpi Prout, 1932
- Mimandria cataractae Prout, 1917
- Mimoclystia cancellata (Warren, 1899)
- Mimoclystia pudicata (Walker, 1862)
- Mixocera albistrigata (Pagenstecher, 1893)
- Nothofidonia ansorgei (Warren, 1901)
- Nothofidonia bicolor Prout, 1915
- Oaracta maculata (Warren, 1897)
- Obolcola petronaria (Guenée, 1858)
- Odontopera acyrthoria (Prout, 1938)
- Odontopera breviata (Prout, 1922)
- Odontopera curticosta (Prout, 1932)
- Odontopera xera (Prout, 1922)
- Oedicentra albipennis Warren, 1902
- Omizodes rubrifasciata (Butler, 1896)
- Omphacodes pulchrifimbria (Warren, 1902)
- Omphalucha brunnea (Warren, 1899)
- Omphax nigricornis (Warren, 1897)
- Omphax plantaria Guenée, 1858
- Orbamia octomaculata (Wallengren, 1872)
- Oreometra vittata Aurivillius, 1910
- Orthonama obstipata (Fabricius, 1794)
- Pachypalpella subalbata (Warren, 1900)
- Paraptychodes tenuis (Butler, 1878)
- Piercia bryophilaria (Warren, 1903)
- Piercia fumitacta (Warren, 1903)
- Piercia kuehnei Karisch, 2008
- Piercia myopteryx Prout, 1935
- Piercia pallidifascia Karisch, 2008
- Piercia prasinaria (Warren, 1901)
- Piercia spatiosata (Walker, 1862)
- Piercia subrufaria (Warren, 1903)
- Piercia subterlimbata (Prout, 1917)
- Piercia subtrunca (Prout, 1932)
- Pigiopsis parallelaria Warren, 1902
- Pingasa distensaria (Walker, 1860)
- Pingasa rhadamaria (Guenée, 1858)
- Pingasa ruginaria (Guenée, 1858)
- Pitthea trifasciata Dewitz, 1881
- Prasinocyma albisticta (Warren, 1901)
- Prasinocyma bifimbriata Prout, 1912
- Prasinocyma centralis Prout, 1915
- Prasinocyma differens (Warren, 1902)
- Prasinocyma dohertyi Warren, 1903
- Prasinocyma geminata Prout, 1913
- Prasinocyma immaculata (Thunberg, 1784)
- Prasinocyma leucophracta Prout, 1932
- Prasinocyma loveridgei Prout, 1926
- Prasinocyma nigrimacula Prout, 1915
- Prasinocyma permitis Prout, 1932
- Prasinocyma perpulverata Prout, 1916
- Prasinocyma pulchraria Swinhoe, 1904
- Prasinocyma pupillata (Warren, 1902)
- Prasinocyma salutaria (Swinhoe, 1904)
- Prasinocyma stictimargo (Warren, 1902)
- Prasinocyma tandi Bethune-Baker, 1913
- Prasinocyma tricolorifrons (Prout, 1913)
- Prasinocyma unipuncta Warren, 1897
- Prasinocyma vermicularia (Guenée, 1858)
- Problepsis aegretta Felder & Rogenhofer, 1875
- Problepsis digammata Kirby, 1896
- Problepsis flavistigma Swinhoe, 1904
- Prosomphax anomala (Warren, 1902)
- Protosteira spectabilis (Warren, 1899)
- Pseudochesias neddaria (Swinhoe, 1904)
- Pseudolarentia arenaria (Warren, 1902)
- Pseudolarentia megalaria (Guenée, 1858)
- Pseudolarentia monosticta (Butler, 1894)
- Psilocerea cneca Prout, 1932
- Psilocerea turpis Warren, 1902
- Psilocladia diaereta Prout, 1923
- Rheumaptera relicta (Herbulot, 1953)
- Rhodometra intervenata Warren, 1902
- Rhodometra sacraria (Linnaeus, 1767)
- Rhodophthitus commaculata (Warren, 1897)
- Rhodophthitus rudicornis (Butler, 1898)
- Scardamia maculata Warren, 1897
- Scopula accentuata (Guenée, 1858)
- Scopula acyma Prout, 1932
- Scopula agrapta (Warren, 1902)
- Scopula alma Prout, 1920
- Scopula argentidisca (Warren, 1902)
- Scopula atricapilla Prout, 1934
- Scopula bigeminata (Warren, 1897)
- Scopula caducaria Swinhoe, 1904
- Scopula candidaria (Warren, 1902)
- Scopula cassiaria (Swinhoe, 1904)
- Scopula cassioides Prout, 1932
- Scopula commaria (Swinhoe, 1904)
- Scopula crawshayi Prout, 1932
- Scopula curvimargo (Warren, 1900)
- Scopula dapharia (Swinhoe, 1904)
- Scopula dissonans (Warren, 1897)
- Scopula erinaria (Swinhoe, 1904)
- Scopula fibulata (Guenée, 1857)
- Scopula fimbrilineata (Warren, 1902)
- Scopula fragilis (Warren, 1903)
- Scopula fuscobrunnea (Warren, 1901)
- Scopula internata (Guenée, 1857)
- Scopula internataria (Walker, 1861)
- Scopula isomala Prout, 1932
- Scopula longitarsata Prout, 1932
- Scopula mesophaena Prout, 1923
- Scopula metacosmia Prout, 1932
- Scopula minoa (Prout, 1916)
- Scopula minorata (Boisduval, 1833)
- Scopula natalica (Butler, 1875)
- Scopula ocellicincta (Warren, 1901)
- Scopula recurvinota (Warren, 1902)
- Scopula rufisalsa (Warren, 1897)
- Scopula sagittilinea (Warren, 1897)
- Scopula sanguinisecta (Warren, 1897)
- Scopula sevandaria (Swinhoe, 1904)
- Scopula silonaria (Guenée, 1858)
- Scopula sinnaria Swinhoe, 1904
- Scopula spoliata (Walker, 1861)
- Scopula technessa Prout, 1932
- Scopula vitiosaria (Swinhoe, 1904)
- Scotopteryx nictitaria (Herrich-Schäffer, 1855)
- Sesquialtera ridicula Prout, 1916
- Somatina ctenophora Prout, 1915
- Somatina figurata Warren, 1897
- Somatina vestalis (Butler, 1875)
- Somatina virginalis Prout, 1917
- Sphingomima viriosa Prout, 1915
- Syncollesis elegans (Prout, 1912)
- Synpelurga innocens (Warren, 1902)
- Terina rogersi Prout, 1915
- Thalassodes albifimbria Warren, 1897
- Thalassodes quadraria Guenée, 1857
- Thelycera hemithales (Prout, 1912)
- Traminda acuta (Warren, 1897)
- Traminda neptunaria (Guenée, 1858)
- Traminda ocellata Warren, 1895
- Traminda vividaria (Walker, 1861)
- Tricentroscelis protrusifrons Prout, 1916
- Trimetopia aetheraria Guenée, 1858
- Tropicollesis albiceris Prout, 1930
- Xanthisthisa fulva (Warren, 1902)
- Xanthisthisa nigrocumulata (Warren, 1902)
- Xanthisthisa tarsispina (Warren, 1901)
- Xanthisthisa tumida (Warren, 1902)
- Xanthorhoe ansorgei (Warren, 1899)
- Xanthorhoe argenteolineata (Aurivillius, 1910)
- Xanthorhoe conchata Warren, 1898
- Xanthorhoe exorista Prout, 1922
- Xanthorhoe heliopharia (Swinhoe, 1904)
- Xanthorhoe poseata (Geyer, 1837)
- Xanthorhoe procne (Fawcett, 1916)
- Xanthorhoe scarificata Prout, 1932
- Xanthorhoe sublesta (Prout, 1932)
- Xanthorhoe submaculata (Warren, 1902)
- Xanthorhoe tamsi D. S. Fletcher, 1963
- Xanthorhoe transcissa (Warren, 1902)
- Xanthorhoe transjugata Prout, 1923
- Xanthorhoe trientata (Warren, 1901)
- Xenimpia angusta Prout, 1915
- Xenochroma candidata Warren, 1902
- Xylopteryx arcuata (Walker, 1862)
- Xylopteryx aucilla Prout, 1926
- Xylopteryx bifida Herbulot, 1984
- Xylopteryx emunctaria (Guenée, 1858)
- Xylopteryx inquilina Agassiz, 2009
- Xylopteryx prasinaria Hampson, 1909
- Xylopteryx protearia Guenée, 1858
- Xylopteryx sima Prout, 1926
- Zamarada amicta Prout, 1915
- Zamarada ansorgei Warren, 1897
- Zamarada bonaberiensis Strand, 1915
- Zamarada calypso Prout, 1926
- Zamarada chrysopa D. S. Fletcher, 1974
- Zamarada collarti Debauche, 1938
- Zamarada crystallophana Mabille, 1900
- Zamarada cucharita D. S. Fletcher, 1974
- Zamarada deceptrix Warren, 1914
- Zamarada delosis D. S. Fletcher, 1974
- Zamarada delta D. S. Fletcher, 1974
- Zamarada dentigera Warren, 1909
- Zamarada differens Bastelberger, 1907
- Zamarada ekphysis D. S. Fletcher, 1974
- Zamarada erosa D. S. Fletcher, 1974
- Zamarada erugata D. S. Fletcher, 1974
- Zamarada euerces Prout, 1928
- Zamarada euphrosyne Oberthür, 1912
- Zamarada eurygnathus D. S. Fletcher, 1974
- Zamarada excavata Bethune-Baker, 1913
- Zamarada hyalinaria (Guenée, 1857)
- Zamarada iobathra Prout, 1932
- Zamarada keraia D. S. Fletcher, 1974
- Zamarada labrys D. S. Fletcher, 1974
- Zamarada latilimbata Rebel, 1948
- Zamarada longidens D. S. Fletcher, 1963
- Zamarada mashariki Aarvik & Bjørnstad, 2007
- Zamarada melasma D. S. Fletcher, 1974
- Zamarada melpomene Oberthür, 1912
- Zamarada mesotaenia Prout, 1931
- Zamarada metrioscaphes Prout, 1912
- Zamarada ochrata Warren, 1902
- Zamarada phaeozona Hampson, 1909
- Zamarada plana Bastelberger, 1909
- Zamarada pringlei D. S. Fletcher, 1974
- Zamarada psammites D. S. Fletcher, 1958
- Zamarada psectra D. S. Fletcher, 1974
- Zamarada pulverosa Warren, 1895
- Zamarada reflexaria (Walker, 1863)
- Zamarada rufilinearia Swinhoe, 1904
- Zamarada scintillans Bastelberger, 1909
- Zamarada secutaria (Guenée, 1858)
- Zamarada torrida D. S. Fletcher, 1974
- Zamarada townsendi D. S. Fletcher, 1974
- Zamarada varii D. S. Fletcher, 1974
- Zamarada vigilans Prout, 1915
- Zamarada vulpina Warren, 1897
- Zeuctoboarmia hyrax (Townsend, 1952)
- Zeuctoboarmia translata Prout, 1915
- Zygophyxia erlangeri Prout, 1932
- Zygophyxia palpata Prout, 1932
- Zygophyxia relictata (Walker, 1866)

== Gracillariidae ==
- Caloptilia fera Triberti, 1989
- Cameraria sokoke de Prins, 2012
- Cameraria torridella de Prins, 2012
- Conopobathra gravissima (Meyrick, 1912)
- Cremastobombycia kipepeo de Prins, 2012
- Phyllonorycter achilleus de Prins, 2012
- Phyllonorycter acutulus de Prins, 2012
- Phyllonorycter agassizi de Prins, 2012
- Phyllonorycter albertinus de Prins, 2012
- Phyllonorycter grewiaecola (Vári, 1961)
- Phyllonorycter grewiaephilos de Prins, 2012
- Phyllonorycter grewiella (Vári, 1961)
- Phyllonorycter hibiscina (Vári, 1961)
- Phyllonorycter hibiscola de Prins, 2012
- Phyllonorycter kazuri de Prins, 2012
- Phyllonorycter lantanae (Vári, 1961)
- Phyllonorycter loxozona (Meyrick, 1936)
- Phyllonorycter melanosparta (Meyrick, 1912)
- Phyllonorycter mida de Prins, 2012
- Phyllonorycter obandai De Prins & Mozuraitis, 2006
- Phyllonorycter ocimellus de Prins, 2012
- Phyllonorycter ololua de Prins, 2012
- Phyllonorycter rongensis de Prins, 2012
- Phyllonorycter silvicola de Prins, 2012
- Phyllonorycter tsavensis de Prins, 2012
- Phyllonorycter turensis de Prins, 2012

== Hepialidae ==
- Antihepialus keniae (Holland, 1892)

== Lasiocampidae ==
- Anadiasa fuscofasciata (Aurivillius, 1922)
- Anadiasa simplex Pagenstecher, 1903
- Beralade bettoni Aurivillius, 1905
- Beralade convergens Hering, 1932
- Beralade pelodes (Tams, 1937)
- Beralade sorana Le Cerf, 1922
- Bombycomorpha bifascia (Walker, 1855)
- Bombycopsis conspersa Aurivillius, 1905
- Bombycopsis lepta (Tams, 1931)
- Braura elgonensis (Kruck, 1940)
- Catalebeda jamesoni (Bethune-Baker, 1908)
- Catalebeda tamsi Hering, 1932
- Chionopsyche montana Aurivillius, 1909
- Chrysopsyche jefferyi Tams, 1926
- Chrysopsyche lutulenta Tams, 1923
- Cleopatrina bilinea (Walker, 1855)
- Cleopatrina phocea (Druce, 1887)
- Dasychirinula chrysogramma Hering, 1926
- Dollmania flavia (Fawcett, 1915)
- Epicnapteroides lobata Strand, 1912
- Eucraera decora (Fawcett, 1915)
- Eucraera koellikerii (Dewitz, 1881)
- Eupagopteryx affinis (Aurivillius, 1909)
- Eutricha morosa (Walker, 1865)
- Euwallengrenia reducta (Walker, 1855)
- Filiola lanceolata (Hering, 1932)
- Gelo joannoui Zolotuhin & Prozorov, 2010
- Gelo jordani (Tams, 1936)
- Gonometa nysa Druce, 1887
- Gonometa postica Walker, 1855
- Gonometa regia Aurivillius, 1905
- Grellada imitans (Aurivillius, 1893)
- Lechriolepis griseola Aurivillius, 1927
- Lechriolepis ochraceola Strand, 1912
- Leipoxais batesi Bethune-Baker, 1927
- Leipoxais compsotes Tams, 1937
- Leipoxais fuscofasciata Aurivillius, 1908
- Leipoxais humfreyi Aurivillius, 1915
- Leipoxais marginepunctata Holland, 1893
- Leipoxais peraffinis Holland, 1893
- Leipoxais proboscidea (Guérin-Méneville, 1832)
- Leipoxais rufobrunnea Strand, 1912
- Leipoxais siccifolia Aurivillius, 1902
- Leipoxais tamsi D. S. Fletcher, 1968
- Mallocampa audea (Druce, 1887)
- Mallocampa leucophaea (Holland, 1893)
- Metajana chanleri Holland, 1896
- Mimopacha cinerascens (Holland, 1893)
- Mimopacha gerstaeckerii (Dewitz, 1881)
- Mimopacha tripunctata (Aurivillius, 1905)
- Morongea arnoldi (Aurivillius, 1909)
- Morongea lampara Zolotuhin & Prozorov, 2010
- Odontocheilopteryx corvus Gurkovich & Zolotuhin, 2009
- Odontocheilopteryx foedifragus Gurkovich & Zolotuhin, 2009
- Odontocheilopteryx myxa Wallengren, 1860
- Odontocheilopteryx pattersoni Tams, 1926
- Odontocheilopteryx politzari Gurkovich & Zolotuhin, 2009
- Odontocheilopteryx scilla Gurkovich & Zolotuhin, 2009
- Odontocheilopteryx spicola Gurkovich & Zolotuhin, 2009
- Odontocheilopteryx stokata Gurkovich & Zolotuhin, 2009
- Odontogama nigricans Aurivillius, 1914
- Opisthodontia budamara Zolotuhin & Prozorov, 2010
- Opisthodontia vensani Zolotuhin & Prozorov, 2010
- Pachymeta contraria (Walker, 1855)
- Pachymeta immunda (Holland, 1893)
- Pachymetana guttata (Aurivillius, 1914)
- Pachytrina diablo Zolotuhin & Gurkovich, 2009
- Pachytrina flamerchena Zolotuhin & Gurkovich, 2009
- Pachytrina okzilina Zolotuhin & Gurkovich, 2009
- Pachytrina philargyria (Hering, 1928)
- Pallastica kakamegata Zolotuhin & Gurkovich, 2009
- Pallastica lateritia (Hering, 1928)
- Pallastica meloui (Riel, 1909)
- Pallastica pallens (Bethune-Baker, 1908)
- Pallastica rubinia Zolotuhin & Gurkovich, 2009
- Pallastica sericeofasciata (Aurivillius, 1921)
- Philotherma jacchus Möschler, 1887
- Philotherma sordida Aurivillius, 1905
- Pseudolyra despecta (Le Cerf, 1922)
- Pseudometa andersoni Tams, 1925
- Pseudometa choba (Druce, 1899)
- Pseudometa pagetodes Tams, 1929
- Sena donaldsoni (Holland, 1901)
- Sena prompta (Walker, 1855)
- Sena scotti (Tams, 1931)
- Sophyrita argibasis (Mabille, 1893)
- Stoermeriana callizona Tams, 1931
- Stoermeriana cervina (Aurivillius, 1927)
- Stoermeriana coilotoma (Bethune-Baker, 1911)
- Stoermeriana fusca (Aurivillius, 1905)
- Stoermeriana graberi (Dewitz, 1881)
- Stoermeriana ocellata Tams, 1929
- Stoermeriana sjostedti (Aurivillius, 1902)
- Stoermeriana tessmanni (Strand, 1912)
- Stoermeriana versicolora Kühne, 2008
- Streblote butiti (Bethune-Baker, 1906)
- Streblote sodalium (Aurivillius, 1915)
- Theophasida kawai Zolotuhin & Prozorov, 2010
- Trabala charon Druce, 1910

== Lecithoceridae ==
- Eridachtha calamopis Meyrick, 1920
- Eridachtha phaeochlora Meyrick, 1920
- Lecithocera sceptrarcha Meyrick, 1920

== Lemoniidae ==
- Sabalia jacksoni Sharpe, 1890
- Sabalia picarina Walker, 1865

== Limacodidae ==
- Caffricola kenyensis Talbot, 1932
- Casphalia elongata Jordan, 1915
- Chrysopoloma crawshayi Aurivillius, 1904
- Coenobasis farouki Wiltshire, 1947
- Coenobasis postflavida Hampson, 1910
- Ctenolita melanosticta (Bethune-Baker, 1909)
- Delorhachis kitale West, 1940
- Gavara camptogramma Hampson, 1910
- Gavara velutina Walker, 1857
- Halseyia bisecta (Butler, 1898)
- Halseyia similis (Hering, 1937)
- Latoia albicosta (Hampson, 1910)
- Lembopteris puella Butler, 1898
- Macroplectra albescens Hampson, 1910
- Macroplectra fuscifusa Hampson, 1910
- Macroplectra obliquilinea Hampson, 1910
- Narosa nephochloeropis Bethune-Baker, 1909
- Niphadolepis auricincta Butler, 1898
- Omocena syrtis (Schaus & Clements, 1893)
- Parapluda incincta (Hampson, 1909)
- Parapluda monogramma (Hampson, 1910)
- Scotinocerides conspersa (Kirby, 1896)
- Scotinocerides microsticta (Bethune-Baker, 1911)
- Scotinochroa inconsequens Butler, 1897
- Zinara cymatoides West, 1937

== Lymantriidae ==
- Aclonophlebia flavinotata Butler, 1898
- Aclonophlebia poecilanthes (Collenette, 1931)
- Aclonophlebia triangulifera Hampson, 1910
- Aroa discalis Walker, 1855
- Aroa incerta Rogenhofer, 1891
- Bracharoa mixta (Snellen, 1872)
- Bracharoa quadripunctata (Wallengren, 1875)
- Carpenterella chionobosca Collenette, 1960
- Casama hemippa Swinhoe, 1906
- Casama impura (Hering, 1926)
- Collenettema crocipes (Boisduval, 1833)
- Creagra liturata (Guérin-Méneville, 1844)
- Cropera testacea Walker, 1855
- Crorema evanescens (Hampson, 1910)
- Crorema fuscinotata (Hampson, 1910)
- Crorema setinoides (Holland, 1893)
- Dasychira aeschra (Hampson, 1926)
- Dasychira chorista Hering, 1926
- Dasychira gonophoroides Collenette, 1939
- Dasychira ilesha Collenette, 1931
- Dasychira lulua Collenette, 1937
- Dasychira ocellifera (Holland, 1893)
- Dasychira punctifera (Walker, 1857)
- Dasychira robusta (Walker, 1855)
- Dasychira sphaleroides Hering, 1926
- Dasychira stegmanni Grünberg, 1910
- Dasychira umbricolora Hampson, 1910
- Eudasychira calliprepes (Collenette, 1933)
- Eudasychira dina (Hering, 1926)
- Eudasychira georgiana (Fawcett, 1900)
- Eudasychira proleprota (Hampson, 1905)
- Euproctis bigutta Holland, 1893
- Euproctis confluens Hering, 1926
- Euproctis conizona Collenette, 1933
- Euproctis consocia Walker, 1865
- Euproctis cryphia Collenette, 1960
- Euproctis dewitzi (Grünberg, 1907)
- Euproctis molunduana Aurivillius, 1925
- Euproctis neavei Tams, 1924
- Euproctis nessa Swinhoe, 1903
- Euproctis nigrifinis (Swinhoe, 1903)
- Euproctis pallida (Kirby, 1896)
- Euproctis perpusilla Hering, 1926
- Euproctis rubricosta Fawcett, 1917
- Euproctis sericaria (Tams, 1924)
- Euproctis utilis Swinhoe, 1903
- Euproctis xanthosoma Hampson, 1910
- Griveaudyria ila (Swinhoe, 1904)
- Homoeomeria flavicapilla (Wallengren, 1860)
- Hyaloperina nudiuscula Aurivillius, 1904
- Jacksoniana striata (Collenette, 1937)
- Knappetra fasciata (Walker, 1855)
- Lacipa albula Fawcett, 1917
- Lacipa flavitincta Hampson, 1910
- Lacipa florida (Swinhoe, 1903)
- Lacipa gracilis Hopffer, 1857
- Lacipa impuncta Butler, 1898
- Lacipa jefferyi (Collenette, 1931)
- Lacipa melanosticta Hampson, 1910
- Lacipa ostra (Swinhoe, 1903)
- Lacipa sundara (Swinhoe, 1903)
- Laelia bifascia Hampson, 1905
- Laelia eutricha Collenette, 1931
- Laelia extorta (Distant, 1897)
- Laelia figlina Distant, 1899
- Laelia fracta Schaus & Clements, 1893
- Laelia gigantea Hampson, 1910
- Laelia gwelila (Swinhoe, 1903)
- Laelia lavia Swinhoe, 1903
- Laelia rogersi Bethune-Baker, 1913
- Leucoma flavifrons (Hampson, 1910)
- Leucoma melanochila (Hering, 1926)
- Leucoma monosticta (Butler, 1898)
- Leucoma parva (Plötz, 1880)
- Lymantria hemipyra Collenette, 1932
- Lymantria tacita Hering, 1927
- Marbla paradoxa (Hering, 1926)
- Marblepsis kakamega Collenette, 1937
- Marblepsis macrocera (Sharpe, 1890)
- Marblepsis tiphia (Swinhoe, 1903)
- Mylantria xanthospila (Plötz, 1880)
- Naroma nigrolunata Collenette, 1931
- Naroma varipes (Walker, 1865)
- Neomardara africana (Holland, 1893)
- Ogoa simplex Walker, 1856
- Olapa fulviceps Hampson, 1910
- Olapa tavetensis (Holland, 1892)
- Orgyia hopkinsi Collenette, 1937
- Palasea arete (Fawcett, 1915)
- Palasea conspersa (Hering, 1927)
- Palasea gondona (Swinhoe, 1903)
- Palasea melia (Fawcett, 1915)
- Palasea melissa (Fawcett, 1915)
- Paramarbla beni (Bethune-Baker, 1909)
- Paramarbla catharia (Collenette, 1933)
- Paramarbla lindblomi (Aurivillius, 1921)
- Pirga bipuncta Hering, 1926
- Pirga loveni Aurivillius, 1921
- Pirga magna Swinhoe, 1903
- Porthesaroa lacipa Hering, 1926
- Porthesaroa noctua Hering, 1926
- Pteredoa monosticta (Butler, 1898)
- Pteredoa siderea Hering, 1926
- Rhodesana mintha Fawcett, 1917
- Rhypopteryx diplogramma Hering, 1927
- Rhypopteryx hemiphanta Collenette, 1955
- Rhypopteryx pachytaenia (Hering, 1926)
- Rhypopteryx psoloconiama Collenette, 1960
- Rhypopteryx summissa Hering, 1927
- Rhypopteryx triangulifera (Hampson, 1910)
- Rhypopteryx xuthosticta (Collenette, 1938)
- Ruanda eleuteriopsis Hering, 1926
- Sphragista kitchingi (Bethune-Baker, 1909)
- Stilpnaroma venosa Hering, 1926
- Stracena kamengo Collenette, 1936
- Stracena promelaena (Holland, 1893)
- Stracena striata Schultze, 1934
- Stracilla ghesquierei Collenette, 1937
- Tamsita habrotima (Tams, 1930)
- Tamsita ochthoeba (Hampson, 1920)

== Lyonetiidae ==
- Platacmaea cretiseca Meyrick, 1920

== Metarbelidae ==
- Aethiopina argentifera Gaede, 1929
- Kroonia dallastai Lehmann, 2010
- Kroonia natalica (Hampson, 1910)
- Lebedodes endomela (Bethune-Baker, 1909)
- Lebedodes johni Lehmann, 2008
- Lebedodes naevius Fawcett, 1916
- Lebedodes velutina Le Cerf, 1914
- Metarbela alluaudi Le Cerf, 1914
- Metarbela cinereolimbata Le Cerf, 1914
- Metarbela dialeuca Hampson, 1910
- Metarbela diodonta Hampson, 1916
- Metarbela distincta Le Cerf, 1922
- Metarbela haberlandorum Lehmann, 1997
- Metarbela latifasciata Gaede, 1929
- Metarbela nubifera (Bethune-Baker, 1909)
- Metarbela pallescens Le Cerf, 1914
- Metarbela perstriata Hampson, 1916
- Metarbela shimonii Lehmann, 2008
- Metarbela simillima (Hampson, 1910)
- Metarbelodes obliqualinea (Bethune-Baker, 1909)
- Mountelgonia arcifera (Hampson, 1909)
- Mountelgonia lumbuaensis Lehmann, 2013
- Mountelgonia percivali Lehmann, 2013
- Mountelgonia thikaensis Lehmann, 2013
- Ortharbela rufula (Hampson, 1910)
- Ortharbela tetrasticta (Hampson, 1910)
- Paralebedella shimonii Lehmann, 2009
- Salagena albonotata (Butler, 1898)
- Salagena atridiscata Hampson, 1910
- Salagena bennybytebieri Lehmann, 2008
- Salagena charlottae Lehmann, 2008
- Salagena eustrigata Hampson, 1916
- Salagena irrorata Le Cerf, 1914
- Salagena narses Fawcett, 1916
- Salagena quentinlukei Lehmann, 2008
- Salagena tessellata Distant, 1897
- Teragra simplicius Le Cerf, 1922
- Teragra trimaculata Gaede, 1929

== Nepticulidae ==
- Stigmella pelanodes (Meyrick, 1920)

== Noctuidae ==
- Abrostola brevipennis (Walker, 1858)
- Abrostola confusa Dufay, 1958
- Abrostola triopis Hampson, 1902
- Achaea catella Guenée, 1852
- Achaea finita (Guenée, 1852)
- Achaea illustrata Walker, 1858
- Achaea lienardi (Boisduval, 1833)
- Acontia aarviki Hacker, Legrain & Fibiger, 2008
- Acontia albatrigona Hacker, Legrain & Fibiger, 2008
- Acontia antica Walker, 1862
- Acontia apatelia (Swinhoe, 1907)
- Acontia atripars Hampson, 1914
- Acontia aurelia Hacker, Legrain & Fibiger, 2008
- Acontia basifera Walker, 1857
- Acontia binominata (Butler, 1892)
- Acontia caeruleopicta Hampson, 1916
- Acontia caffraria (Cramer, 1777)
- Acontia callima Bethune-Baker, 1911
- Acontia carnescens (Hampson, 1910)
- Acontia dichroa (Hampson, 1914)
- Acontia discoidea Hopffer, 1857
- Acontia discoidoides Hacker, Legrain & Fibiger, 2008
- Acontia ectorrida (Hampson, 1916)
- Acontia goateri Hacker, Legrain & Fibiger, 2010
- Acontia guttifera Felder & Rogenhofer, 1874
- Acontia hampsoni Hacker, Legrain & Fibiger, 2008
- Acontia hausmanni Hacker, 2010
- Acontia hemixanthia (Hampson, 1910)
- Acontia hoppei Hacker, Legrain & Fibiger, 2008
- Acontia hortensis Swinhoe, 1884
- Acontia insocia (Walker, 1857)
- Acontia leucotrigona (Hampson, 1905)
- Acontia mascheriniae (Berio, 1985)
- Acontia melaphora (Hampson, 1910)
- Acontia miogona (Hampson, 1916)
- Acontia natalis (Guenée, 1852)
- Acontia niphogona (Hampson, 1909)
- Acontia notha Hacker, Legrain & Fibiger, 2010
- Acontia nubila Hampson, 1910
- Acontia obliqua Hacker, Legrain & Fibiger, 2010
- Acontia opalinoides Guenée, 1852
- Acontia porphyrea (Butler, 1898)
- Acontia purpurata Hacker, Legrain & Fibiger, 2010
- Acontia purpureofacta Hacker, Legrain & Fibiger, 2010
- Acontia schreieri Hacker, Legrain & Fibiger, 2010
- Acontia secta Guenée, 1852
- Acontia semialba Hampson, 1910
- Acontia sublactea Hacker, Legrain & Fibiger, 2008
- Acontia szunyoghyi Hacker, Legrain & Fibiger, 2010
- Acontia tanzaniae Hacker, Legrain & Fibiger, 2010
- Acontia torrefacta (Distant, 1898)
- Acontia trimaculata Aurivillius, 1879
- Acontia versicolora Hacker, 2010
- Acontia wiltshirei Hacker, Legrain & Fibiger, 2008
- Acrapex brunnea Hampson, 1910
- Acrapex curvata Hampson, 1902
- Acrapex rhabdoneura Hampson, 1910
- Adisura atkinsoni Moore, 1881
- Aegocera brevivitta Hampson, 1901
- Aegocera rectilinea Boisduval, 1836
- Agoma trimenii (Felder, 1874)
- Agrotana jacksoni Bethune-Baker, 1911
- Agrotis biconica Kollar, 1844
- Agrotis longidentifera (Hampson, 1903)
- Agrotis segetum ([Denis & Schiffermüller], 1775)
- Aletia consanguis (Guenée, 1852)
- Aletia tincta (Walker, 1858)
- Amazonides ascia D. S. Fletcher, 1961
- Amazonides epipyria (Hampson, 1903)
- Amazonides fuscirufa (Hampson, 1903)
- Amazonides griseofusca (Hampson, 1913)
- Amazonides ustula (Hampson, 1913)
- Amyna axis Guenée, 1852
- Amyna magnifoveata Hampson, 1918
- Amyna punctum (Fabricius, 1794)
- Androlymnia clavata Hampson, 1910
- Anoba rufitermina Hampson, 1926
- Anoba sinuata (Fabricius, 1775)
- Anomis erosa (Hübner, 1818)
- Anomis involuta Walker, 1857
- Anomis polymorpha Hampson, 1926
- Anomis sabulifera (Guenée, 1852)
- Apospasta fuscirufa (Hampson, 1905)
- Apospasta venata (Hampson, 1905)
- Ariathisa abyssinia (Guenée, 1852)
- Ariathisa semiluna (Hampson, 1909)
- Asota speciosa (Drury, 1773)
- Aspidifrontia binagwahoi Laporte, 1978
- Aspidifrontia radiata Hampson, 1905
- Aspidifrontia sagitta Berio, 1964
- Athetis anomoeosis Hampson, 1909
- Athetis glauca (Hampson, 1902)
- Athetis glaucopis (Bethune-Baker, 1911)
- Athetis hyperaeschra Hampson, 1909
- Athetis ignava (Guenée, 1852)
- Athetis melanosticta Hampson, 1909
- Athetis micra (Hampson, 1902)
- Athetis nitens (Saalmüller, 1891)
- Athetis pigra (Guenée, 1852)
- Athetis scotopis (Bethune-Baker, 1911)
- Audea fatilega (Felder & Rogenhofer, 1874)
- Audea melanoplaga Hampson, 1902
- Autoba admota (Felder & Rogenhofer, 1874)
- Axylia coniorta (Hampson, 1903)
- Bamra glaucopasta (Bethune-Baker, 1911)
- Bocula horus (Fawcett, 1916)
- Brevipecten calimanii (Berio, 1939)
- Brevipecten cornuta Hampson, 1902
- Brevipecten marmoreata Hacker & Fibiger, 2007
- Brevipecten tessenei Berio, 1939
- Calesia zambesita Walker, 1865
- Calliodes pretiosissima Holland, 1892
- Callopistria latreillei (Duponchel, 1827)
- Callopistria maillardi (Guenée, 1862)
- Caradrina atriluna Guenée, 1852
- Carcharoda flavirosea Hampson, 1910
- Carpostalagma pulverulentus Talbot, 1929
- Catephia abrostolica Hampson, 1926
- Catephia sciras Fawcett, 1916
- Catephia metaleuca Hampson, 1926
- Catephia scylla Fawcett, 1916
- Catephia serapis Fawcett, 1916
- Catephia sospita Fawcett, 1916
- Cerocala masaica Hampson, 1913
- Cerynea endotrichalis Hampson, 1910
- Cerynea ignealis Hampson, 1910
- Cerynea thermesialis (Walker, 1866)
- Chabuata amoeba Hampson, 1905
- Chalciope delta (Boisduval, 1833)
- Chelecala trefoliata (Butler, 1898)
- Chrysodeixis acuta (Walker, [1858])
- Chrysodeixis eriosoma (Doubleday, 1843)
- Corgatha drepanodes Hampson, 1910
- Cortyta canescens Walker, 1858
- Cortyta remigiana Hampson, 1913
- Crameria amabilis (Drury, 1773)
- Cretonia atrisigna Hampson, 1910
- Cretonia ethiopica Hampson, 1910
- Cryphia leucomelaena (Hampson, 1908)
- Crypsotidia maculifera (Staudinger, 1898)
- Crypsotidia mesosema Hampson, 1913
- Ctenoplusia fracta (Walker, 1857)
- Ctenoplusia limbirena (Guenée, 1852)
- Ctenoplusia camptogamma (Hampson, 1910)
- Cucullia rufescens Hampson, 1906
- Cuneisigna cumamita (Bethune-Baker, 1911)
- Cuneisigna rivulata (Hampson, 1902)
- Cyligramma fluctuosa (Drury, 1773)
- Cyligramma latona (Cramer, 1775)
- Cyligramma limacina (Guérin-Méneville, 1832)
- Dicerogastra proleuca (Hampson, 1913)
- Digama africana Swinhoe, 1907
- Digama serratula Talbot, 1932
- Dysgonia abnegans (Walker, 1858)
- Dysgonia angularis (Boisduval, 1833)
- Dysgonia erectata (Hampson, 1902)
- Dysgonia torrida (Guenée, 1852)
- Ectolopha marginata Hampson, 1910
- Ectolopha viridescens Hampson, 1902
- Egnasia vicaria (Walker, 1866)
- Egybolis vaillantina (Stoll, 1790)
- Elyptron leucosticta (Hampson, 1909)
- Entomogramma pardus Guenée, 1852
- Epharmottomena sublimbata Berio, 1894
- Epischausia dispar (Rothschild, 1896)
- Erebus walkeri (Butler, 1875)
- Ericeia congregata (Walker, 1858)
- Ericeia inangulata (Guenée, 1852)
- Ethiopica hesperonota Hampson, 1909
- Ethiopica umbra Le Cerf, 1922
- Eublemma anachoresis (Wallengren, 1863)
- Eublemma baccalix (Swinhoe, 1886)
- Eublemma bicolora Bethune-Baker, 1911
- Eublemma brunneosa Bethune-Baker, 1911
- Eublemma chlorochroa Hampson, 1910
- Eublemma cochylioides (Guenée, 1852)
- Eublemma decora (Walker, 1869)
- Eublemma exigua (Walker, 1858)
- Eublemma flavistriata Hampson, 1910
- Eublemma foedosa (Guenée, 1852)
- Eublemma gayneri (Rothschild, 1901)
- Eublemma hypozonata Hampson, 1910
- Eublemma leucozona Hampson, 1910
- Eublemma minutoides Poole, 1989
- Eublemma nyctichroa Hampson, 1910
- Eublemma ornatula (Felder & Rogenhofer, 1874)
- Eublemma perobliqua Hampson, 1910
- Eublemma psamathea Hampson, 1910
- Eublemma ragusana (Freyer, 1844)
- Eublemma reducta Butler, 1894
- Eublemma roseocincta Hampson, 1910
- Eublemma seminivea Hampson, 1896
- Eublemma therma Hampson, 1910
- Eublemma xanthocraspis Hampson, 1910
- Eublemmoides apicimacula (Mabille, 1880)
- Eudocima divitiosa (Walker, 1869)
- Eudocima materna (Linnaeus, 1767)
- Eulocastra aethiops (Distant, 1898)
- Eulocastra hypotaenia (Wallengren, 1860)
- Euplexia azyga Hampson, 1908
- Euplexia chalybsa Hampson, 1908
- Euplexia melanocycla Hampson, 1908
- Euplexia rhoda Hampson, 1908
- Eustrotia amydrozona Hampson, 1910
- Eustrotia citripennis Hampson, 1910
- Eustrotia cumalinea Bethune-Baker, 1911
- Eustrotia decissima (Walker, 1865)
- Eustrotia diascia Hampson, 1910
- Eustrotia megalena (Mabille, 1900)
- Eustrotia melanopis Hampson, 1910
- Eustrotia trigonodes Hampson, 1910
- Eustrotiopis chlorota Hampson, 1926
- Eutelia amatrix Walker, 1858
- Eutelia bowkeri (Felder & Rogenhofer, 1874)
- Eutelia discitriga Walker, 1865
- Eutelia symphonica Hampson, 1902
- Euxoa axiliodes Hampson, 1903
- Euxootera atrisparsa (Hampson, 1903)
- Euxootera melanomesa (Hampson, 1913)
- Exathetis strigata (Hampson, 1911)
- Feliniopsis africana (Schaus & Clements, 1893)
- Feliniopsis connivens (Felder & Rogenhofer, 1874)
- Feliniopsis consummata (Walker, 1857)
- Feliniopsis duponti (Laporte, 1974)
- Feliniopsis nigribarbata (Hampson, 1908)
- Feliniopsis opposita (Walker, 1865)
- Feliniopsis parvuloides Hacker, 2010
- Feliniopsis talhouki (Wiltshire, 1983)
- Grammodes congenita Walker, 1858
- Grammodes exclusiva Pagenstecher, 1907
- Grammodes geometrica (Fabricius, 1775)
- Grammodes stolida (Fabricius, 1775)
- Hadena bulgeri (Felder & Rogenhofer, 1874)
- Hadjina atrinota Hampson, 1909
- Heliocheilus cana (Hampson, 1903)
- Heliocheilus discalis (Hampson, 1903)
- Heliocheilus multiradiata (Hampson, 1902)
- Heliocheilus perdentata (Hampson, 1903)
- Heliophisma klugii (Boisduval, 1833)
- Hemituerta mahdi (Pagenstecher, 1903)
- Heraclia africana (Butler, 1875)
- Heraclia aisha (Kirby, 1891)
- Heraclia flavisignata (Hampson, 1912)
- Heraclia gruenbergi (Wichgraf, 1911)
- Heraclia hypercompoides (Butler, 1895)
- Heraclia karschi (Holland, 1897)
- Heraclia monslunensis (Hampson, 1901)
- Heraclia nandi Kiriakoff, 1974
- Heraclia perdix (Druce, 1887)
- Heraclia poggei (Dewitz, 1879)
- Heraclia superba (Butler, 1875)
- Heraclia thruppi (Butler, 1886)
- Heteropalpia robusta Wiltshire, 1988
- Honeyia clearchus (Fawcett, 1916)
- Hopetounia marginata Hampson, 1926
- Hypena obacerralis Walker, 1859
- Hypena striolalis Aurivillius, 1910
- Hypena vulgatalis Walker, 1859
- Hypocala rostrata (Fabricius, 1794)
- Hypoperigea medionota Hampson, 1920
- Hypopyra africana (Kirby, 1896)
- Hypopyra capensis Herrich-Schäffer, 1854
- Hypopyra rufescens (Kirby, 1896)
- Hypotacha isthmigera Wiltshire, 1968
- Hypotacha ochribasalis (Hampson, 1896)
- Iambia thwaitesi (Moore, 1885)
- Idia pernix (Townsend, 1958)
- Janseodes melanospila (Guenée, 1852)
- Leucania acrapex (Hampson, 1905)
- Leucania bilineata (Hampson, 1905)
- Leucania citrinotata (Hampson, 1905)
- Leucania clavifera (Hampson, 1907)
- Leucania confluens (Bethune-Baker, 1909)
- Leucania leucogramma (Hampson, 1905)
- Leucania melianoides Möschler, 1883
- Leucania nebulosa Hampson, 1902
- Leucania pectinata (Hampson, 1905)
- Leucania phaea Hampson, 1902
- Leucania praetexta Townsend, 1955
- Leucania sarca Hampson, 1902
- Leucania tacuna Felder & Rogenhofer, 1874
- Leucania tenebra (Hampson, 1905)
- Leucania usta Hampson, 1902
- Lithacodia blandula (Guenée, 1862)
- Lophoptera litigiosa (Boisduval, 1833)
- Lophorache fulvirufa Hampson, 1910
- Lophotidia trisema Hampson, 1913
- Marathyssa cuneata (Saalmüller, 1891)
- Marca proclinata Saalmüller, 1891
- Marcipa carcassoni Pelletier, 1975
- Masalia albiseriata (Druce, 1903)
- Masalia beatrix (Moore, 1881)
- Masalia bimaculata (Moore, 1888)
- Masalia disticta (Hampson, 1902)
- Masalia fissifascia (Hampson, 1903)
- Masalia flavistrigata (Hampson, 1903)
- Masalia galatheae (Wallengren, 1856)
- Masalia latinigra (Hampson, 1907)
- Masalia leucosticta (Hampson, 1902)
- Masalia perstriata (Hampson, 1903)
- Masalia transvaalica (Distant, 1902)
- Matopo actinophora Hampson, 1909
- Matopo descarpentriesi (Laporte, 1975)
- Maxera marchalii (Boisduval, 1833)
- Melanephia endophaea Hampson, 1926
- Melanephia nigrescens (Wallengren, 1856)
- Mentaxya albifrons (Geyer, 1837)
- Mentaxya ignicollis (Walker, 1857)
- Mentaxya indigna (Herrich-Schäffer, 1854)
- Mentaxya muscosa Geyer, 1837
- Mentaxya rimosa (Guenée, 1852)
- Metachrostis quinaria (Moore, 1881)
- Metappana ethiopica (Hampson, 1907)
- Micragrotis acydonta Hampson, 1903
- Micragrotis cinerosa Bethune-Baker, 1911
- Micragrotis lacteata Hampson, 1903
- Mitrophrys ansorgei (Rothschild, 1897)
- Mitrophrys menete (Cramer, 1775)
- Mocis mayeri (Boisduval, 1833)
- Mocis mutuaria (Walker, 1858)
- Mocis repanda (Fabricius, 1794)
- Mocis undata (Fabricius, 1775)
- Mythimna poliastis (Hampson, 1902)
- Nodaria externalis Guenée, 1854
- Nyodes viridirufa (Hampson, 1918)
- Odontestra albivitta Hampson, 1905
- Oedicodia limbata Butler, 1898
- Oedicodia violascens Hampson, 1910
- Oligia ambigua (Walker, 1858)
- Omphalestra geraea (Hampson, 1907)
- Omphalestra submedianata (Hampson, 1905)
- Omphaletis ethiopica Hampson, 1909
- Ophiusa finifascia (Walker, 1858)
- Oraesia emarginata (Fabricius, 1794)
- Oraesia provocans Walker, [1858]
- Oraesia wintgensi (Strand, 1909)
- Ozarba accincta (Distant, 1898)
- Ozarba apicalis Hampson, 1910
- Ozarba atrifera Hampson, 1910
- Ozarba bipartita (Hampson, 1902)
- Ozarba flavescens Hampson, 1910
- Ozarba heliastis (Hampson, 1902)
- Ozarba hypoxantha (Wallengren, 1860)
- Ozarba isocampta Hampson, 1910
- Ozarba lepida Saalmüller, 1891
- Ozarba megaplaga Hampson, 1910
- Ozarba nyanza (Felder & Rogenhofer, 1874)
- Ozarba sinua Hampson, 1910
- Ozarba terribilis Berio, 1940
- Ozarba tricuspis Hampson, 1910
- Pandesma robusta (Walker, 1858)
- Parachalciope mahura (Felder & Rogenhofer, 1874)
- Parachalciope trigonometrica Hampson, 1913
- Parafodina pentagonalis (Butler, 1894)
- Pericyma atrifusa (Hampson, 1902)
- Pericyma mendax (Walker, 1858)
- Pericyma metaleuca Hampson, 1913
- Phaegorista enarges Tams, 1930
- Phaegorista leucomelas (Herrich-Schäffer, 1855)
- Photedes homora (Bethune-Baker, 1911)
- Phytometra curvifera (Hampson, 1926)
- Phytometra magalium (Townsend, 1958)
- Phytometra rhodopa (Bethune-Baker, 1911)
- Plecoptera approximans Hampson, 1926
- Plecoptera diplogramma Hampson, 1926
- Plecoptera hypoxantha Hampson, 1926
- Plecoptera melanoscia Hampson, 1926
- Plecopterodes synethes Hampson, 1913
- Plusiodonta basirhabdota Hampson, 1926
- Plusiodonta macra Hampson, 1926
- Plusiodonta megista Hampson, 1926
- Polia atrirena Hampson, 1905
- Polydesma umbricola Boisduval, 1833
- Prionofrontia nyctiscia Hampson, 1926
- Proconis abrostoloides Hampson, 1902
- Procriosis albizona Hampson, 1918
- Procriosis dileuca Hampson, 1910
- Proschaliphora citricostata Hampson, 1901
- Pseudcraspedia punctata Hampson, 1898
- Pseudomicrodes rufigrisea Hampson, 1910
- Pseudozarba mianoides (Hampson, 1893)
- Rhabdophera hansali (Felder & Rogenhofer, 1874)
- Rhanidophora piguerator Hampson, 1926
- Rhesala moestalis (Walker, 1866)
- Rhesala punctisigna Hampson, 1926
- Rhynchina taruensis Butler, 1898
- Rivula lophosoma Hampson, 1926
- Rougeotia osellai Berio, 1978
- Rougeotia praetexta Townsend, 1956
- Sesamia epunctifera Hampson, 1902
- Sesamia roseoflammata Pinhey, 1956
- Simplicia extinctalis (Zeller, 1852)
- Simplicia inflexalis Guenée, 1854
- Soloe fumipennis Hampson, 1910
- Soloe plicata Pinhey, 1952
- Soloella orientis Kühne, 2007
- Sommeria culta Hübner, 1831
- Sphingomorpha chlorea (Cramer, 1777)
- Spodoptera cilium Guenée, 1852
- Spodoptera exempta (Walker, 1857)
- Spodoptera exigua (Hübner, 1808)
- Spodoptera littoralis (Boisduval, 1833)
- Spodoptera mauritia (Boisduval, 1833)
- Stenosticta grisea Hampson, 1912
- Stilbotis basalis (Berio, 1978)
- Stilbotis georgyi Laporte, 1984
- Stilbotis jouanini Laporte, 1975
- Syngrapha circumflexa (Linnaeus, 1767)
- Tathorhynchus leucobasis Bethune-Baker, 1911
- Thiacidas berenice (Fawcett, 1916)
- Thiacidas fasciata (Fawcett, 1917)
- Thiacidas fuscomacula Hacker & Zilli, 2010
- Thiacidas hampsoni (Hacker, 2004)
- Thiacidas orientalis Hacker & Zilli, 2010
- Thiacidas permutata Hacker & Zilli, 2007
- Thiacidas schausi (Hampson, 1905)
- Thiacidas senex (Bethune-Baker, 1911)
- Thiacidas smythi (Gaede, 1939)
- Thiacidas subhampsoni Hacker & Zilli, 2010
- Thiacidas triangulata (Gaede, 1939)
- Thyas arcifera (Hampson, 1913)
- Thysanoplusia sestertia (Felder & Rogenhofer, 1874)
- Timora adamsoni Pinhey, 1956
- Toana flaviceps Hampson, 1918
- Tolpia atripuncta Hampson, 1926
- Tracheplexia lucia (Felder & Rogenhofer, 1974)
- Trichoplusia ni (Hübner, [1803])
- Trichoplusia orichalcea (Fabricius, 1775)
- Trigonodes hyppasia (Cramer, 1779)
- Tuerta cyanopasta Hampson, 1907
- Tycomarptes inferior (Guenée, 1852)
- Tytroca alabuensis Wiltshire, 1970
- Ugia albilinea Hampson, 1926
- Ulotrichopus eugeniae Saldaitis & Ivinskis, 2010
- Ulotrichopus phaeopera Hampson, 1913
- Ulotrichopus primulina (Hampson, 1902)
- Uncula tristigmatias (Hampson, 1902)
- Vietteania torrentium (Guenée, 1852)
- Vittaplusia vittata (Wallengren, 1856)
- Xanthomera leucoglene (Mabille, 1880)
- Zalaca snelleni (Wallengren, 1875)
- Zethesides bettoni (Butler, 1898)

== Nolidae ==
- Arcyophora dives (Butler, 1898)
- Blenina squamifera (Wallengren, 1860)
- Bryophilopsis tarachoides Mabille, 1900
- Characoma submediana Wiltshire, 1986
- Earias biplaga Walker, 1866
- Earias cupreoviridis (Walker, 1862)
- Earias insulana (Boisduval, 1833)
- Eligma laetepicta Oberthür, 1893
- Garella nubilosa Hampson, 1912
- Giaura leucotis (Hampson, 1905)
- Maurilia arcuata (Walker, [1858])
- Meganola jacobi Agassiz, 2009
- Meganola melanosticta (Hampson, 1914)
- Meganola reubeni Agassiz, 2009
- Negeta luminosa (Walker, 1858)
- Nola chionea Hampson, 1911
- Nola diplozona Hampson, 1914
- Nola leucalea Hampson, 1907
- Nola melaleuca (Hampson, 1901)
- Nola melanoscelis (Hampson, 1914)
- Nola phaeocraspis (Hampson, 1909)
- Nola progonia (Hampson, 1914)
- Nycteola malachitis (Hampson, 1912)
- Odontestis striata Hampson, 1912
- Oedicraspis subfervida Hampson, 1912
- Pardasena melanosticta Hampson, 1912
- Pardasena roeselioides (Walker, 1858)
- Pardasena virgulana (Mabille, 1880)
- Risoba diplogramma Hampson, 1912
- Risoba obstructa Moore, 1881
- Risoba sticticraspis Hampson, 1912
- Selepa leucogonia (Hampson, 1905)
- Selepa nephelozona (Hampson, 1905)
- Xanthodes dinarodes (Hampson, 1912)

== Notodontidae ==
- Achaera ochribasis (Hampson, 1910)
- Afrocerura leonensis (Hampson, 1910)
- Antheua liparidioides (Rothschild, 1910)
- Antheua simplex Walker, 1855
- Antheua trifasciata (Hampson, 1909)
- Antheua woerdeni (Snellen, 1872)
- Bisolita rubrifascia (Hampson, 1910)
- Clostera solitaria Kiriakoff, 1962
- Desmeocraera decorata (Wichgraf, 1922)
- Desmeocraera tripuncta Janse, 1920
- Epicerura plumosa Kiriakoff, 1962
- Epicerura steniptera (Hampson, 1910)
- Epidonta eroki Bethune-Baker, 1911
- Eulavinia lavinia (Fawcett, 1916)
- Eutimia marpissa Wallengren, 1858
- Nepheliphora nubifera (Hampson, 1910)
- Phalera princei Grünberg, 1909
- Polienus capillata (Wallengren, 1875)
- Psalisodes atrifasciata Hampson, 1910
- Psalisodes discalis (Hampson, 1910)
- Psalisodes xylochroa (Hampson, 1910)
- Rasemia macrodonta (Hampson, 1909)
- Simesia dasychiroides (Butler, 1898)
- Stenostaura harperi Agassiz, 2009
- Tmetopteryx dorsimaculata Kiriakoff, 1965
- Tmetopteryx maura Kiriakoff, 1965
- Trotonotus bettoni Butler, 1898
- Xanthodonta nigrovittata (Aurivilius, 1921)
- Xanthodonta unicornis Kiriakoff, 1961

== Oecophoridae ==
- Tortilia rimulata (Meyrick, 1920)

== Plutellidae ==
- Genostele fornicata Meyrick, 1920
- Paraxenistis africana Mey, 2007
- Paraxenistis serrata Mey, 2007
- Plutella xylostella (Linnaeus, 1758)

== Psychidae ==
- Acanthopsyche calamochroa (Hampson, 1910)
- Ctenocompa amydrota Meyrick, 1920
- Ctenocompa famula Meyrick, 1920
- Melasina hyacinthias Meyrick, 1920
- Melasina ichnophora Meyrick, 1920
- Melasina olenitis Meyrick, 1914
- Melasina spumosa Meyrick, 1920
- Melasina stabularia Meyrick, 1908
- Melasina varicosa Meyrick, 1920
- Narycia acharis Meyrick, 1920
- Narycia exalbida Meyrick, 1920
- Narycia nubilosa Meyrick, 1920
- Typhonia bettoni (Butler, 1898)

== Pterophoridae ==
- Agdistis aberdareana Arenberger, 1988
- Agdistis kenyana Arenberger, 1988
- Agdistis korana Arenberger, 1988
- Agdistis linnaei Gielis, 2008
- Agdistis malitiosa Meyrick, 1909
- Agdistis obstinata Meyrick, 1920
- Agdistis riftvalleyi Arenberger, 2001
- Amblyptilia direptalis (Walker, 1864)
- Apoxyptilus anthites (Meyrick, 1936)
- Bipunctiphorus etiennei Gibeaux, 1994
- Crassuncus chappuisi Gibeaux, 1994
- Emmelina amseli (Bigot, 1969)
- Emmelina bigoti Gibeaux, 1990
- Emmelina monodactyla (Linnaeus, 1758)
- Exelastis atomosa (Walsingham, 1885)
- Exelastis ebalensis (Rebel, 1907)
- Hellinsia conscius (Meyrick, 1920)
- Megalorhipida leptomeres (Meyrick, 1886)
- Megalorhipida leucodactylus (Fabricius, 1794)
- Merrifieldia improvisa Arenberger, 2001
- Oxyptilus insomnis (Townsend, 1956)
- Picardia eparches (Meyrick, 1931)
- Platyptilia aarviki Gielis, 2008
- Platyptilia humida Meyrick, 1920
- Platyptilia molopias Meyrick, 1906
- Platyptilia morophaea Meyrick, 1920
- Platyptilia picta Meyrick, 1913
- Platyptilia rhyncholoba Meyrick, 1924
- Platyptilia sciophaea Meyrick, 1920
- Platyptilia thiosoma Meyrick, 1920
- Pselnophorus jaechi (Arenberger, 1993)
- Pterophorus albidus (Zeller, 1852)
- Pterophorus candidalis (Walker, 1864)
- Pterophorus cleronoma (Meyrick, 1920)
- Pterophorus massai Gielis, 1991
- Pterophorus rhyparias (Meyrick, 1908)
- Sphenarches anisodactylus (Walker, 1864)
- Stenodacma wahlbergi (Zeller, 1852)
- Stenoptilia conicephala Gielis, 1990
- Stenoptilia ionota Meyrick, 1920
- Stenoptilia melanoloncha Meyrick, 1927
- Stenoptilia zophodactylus (Duponchel, 1840)
- Stenoptilodes taprobanes (Felder & Rogenhofer, 1875)
- Titanoptilus melanodonta Hampson, 1905
- Walsinghamiella illustris (Townsend, 1958)

== Pyralidae ==
- Aglossa fumifusalis Hampson, 1916
- Anobostra varians (Butler, 1898)
- Ematheudes straminella Snellen, 1872
- Endotricha consobrinalis Zeller, 1852
- Endotricha ellisoni Whalley, 1963
- Endotricha vinolentalis Ragonot, 1891
- Lamoria imbella (Walker, 1864)
- Mussidia nigrivenella Ragonot, 1888
- Paraglossa atrisquamalis Hampson, 1906
- Pempelia morosalis (Saalmüller, 1880)
- Phycitodes albistriata Hampson, 1917
- Pithyllis metachryseis (Hampson, 1906)
- Pyralis galactalis Hampson, 1916

== Saturniidae ==
- Argema besanti Rebel, 1895
- Argema mimosae (Boisduval, 1847)
- Aurivillius arata (Westwood, 1849)
- Aurivillius seydeli Rougeot, 1962
- Bunaea aslauga Kirby, 1877
- Bunaeopsis hersilia (Westwood, 1849)
- Bunaeopsis jacksoni (Jordan, 1908)
- Bunaeopsis licharbas (Maassen & Weymer, 1885)
- Bunaeopsis oubie (Guérin-Méneville, 1849)
- Campimoptilum boulardi (Rougeot, 1974)
- Campimoptilum hollandi (Butler, 1898)
- Campimoptilum kuntzei (Dewitz, 1881)
- Cinabra hyperbius (Westwood, 1881)
- Decachorda aspersa (Felder, 1874)
- Decachorda bouvieri Hering, 1929
- Decachorda fulvia (Druce, 1886)
- Decachorda mombasana Stoneham, 1962
- Decachorda rosea Aurivillius, 1898
- Eosia digennaroi Bouyer, 2008
- Eosia insignis Le Cerf, 1911
- Epiphora albidus (Druce, 1886)
- Epiphora antinorii (Oberthür, 1880)
- Epiphora bauhiniae (Guérin-Méneville, 1832)
- Epiphora congolana (Bouvier, 1929)
- Epiphora intermedia (Rougeot, 1955)
- Epiphora magdalena Grünberg, 1909
- Epiphora mythimnia (Westwood, 1849)
- Epiphora rectifascia Rothschild, 1907
- Gonimbrasia anna (Maassen & Weymer, 1885)
- Gonimbrasia conradsi (Rebel, 1906)
- Gonimbrasia hoehnelii (Rogenhofer, 1891)
- Gonimbrasia occidentalis Rothschild, 1907
- Gonimbrasia rectilineata (Sonthonnax, 1899)
- Gonimbrasia tyrrhea (Cramer, 1775)
- Gonimbrasia wahlbergii (Boisduval, 1847)
- Gonimbrasia zambesina (Walker, 1865)
- Goodia unguiculata Bouvier, 1936
- Gynanisa albescens Sonthonnax, 1904
- Gynanisa kenya Darge, 2008
- Gynanisa maja (Klug, 1836)
- Gynanisa westwoodi Rothschild, 1895
- Holocerina angulata (Aurivillius, 1893)
- Holocerina istsariensis Stoneham, 1962
- Holocerina smilax (Westwood, 1849)
- Imbrasia epimethea (Drury, 1772)
- Imbrasia ertli Rebel, 1904
- Lobobunaea acetes (Westwood, 1849)
- Lobobunaea goodi (Holland, 1893)
- Lobobunaea jeanneli Rougeot, 1959
- Lobobunaea kuehnei Naumann, 2008
- Lobobunaea phaedusa (Drury, 1782)
- Ludia arguta Jordan, 1922
- Ludia delegorguei (Boisduval, 1847)
- Ludia dentata (Hampson, 1891)
- Ludia hansali Felder, 1874
- Ludia orinoptena Karsch, 1892
- Ludia pseudovetusta Rougeot, 1978
- Melanocera menippe (Westwood, 1849)
- Melanocera pinheyi Lemaire & Rougeot, 1974
- Melanocera sufferti (Weymer, 1896)
- Melanocera widenti Terral & Darge, 1991
- Micragone cana (Aurivillius, 1893)
- Nudaurelia anthinoides Rougeot, 1978
- Nudaurelia belayneshae Rougeot, 1978
- Nudaurelia capdevillei Rougeot, 1979
- Nudaurelia dione (Fabricius, 1793)
- Nudaurelia eblis Strecker, 1876
- Nudaurelia emini (Butler, 1888)
- Nudaurelia krucki Hering, 1930
- Nudaurelia macrothyris (Rothschild, 1906)
- Orthogonioptilum adiegetum Karsch, 1892
- Pselaphelia flavivitta (Walker, 1862)
- Pselaphelia vandenberghei Bouyer, 1992
- Pseudaphelia apollinaris (Boisduval, 1847)
- Pseudobunaea cleopatra (Aurivillius, 1893)
- Pseudobunaea deaconi (Stoneham, 1962)
- Pseudobunaea epithyrena (Maassen & Weymer, 1885)
- Pseudobunaea irius (Fabricius, 1793)
- Pseudobunaea tyrrhena (Westwood, 1849)
- Rohaniella pygmaea (Maassen & Weymer, 1885)
- Tagoropsis flavinata (Walker, 1865)
- Tagoropsis hanningtoni (Butler, 1883)
- Tagoropsis rougeoti D. S. Fletcher, 1952
- Urota sinope (Westwood, 1849)
- Usta angulata Rothschild, 1895
- Usta wallengrenii (C. & R. Felder, 1859)
- Yatanga smithi (Holland, 1892)

== Sesiidae ==
- Camaegeria massai Bartsch & Berg, 2012
- Chamanthedon leucocera Hampson, 1919
- Homogyna alluaudi Le Cerf, 1911
- Lophoceps abdominalis Hampson, 1919
- Macrotarsipus albipunctus Hampson, 1893
- Macrotarsipus microthyris Hampson, 1919
- Melittia amblyphaea Hampson, 1919
- Melittia haematopis Fawcett, 1916
- Melittia lentistriata Hampson, 1919
- Melittia natalensis Butler, 1874
- Melittia xanthogaster Hampson, 1919
- Paranthrene xanthopyga Hampson, 1919
- Synanthedon erythromma Hampson, 1919
- Tipulamima pyrosoma Hampson, 1919

== Sphingidae ==
- Acanthosphinx guessfeldti (Dewitz, 1879)
- Acherontia atropos (Linnaeus, 1758)
- Agrius convolvuli (Linnaeus, 1758)
- Andriasa contraria Walker, 1856
- Antinephele achlora Holland, 1893
- Antinephele anomala (Butler, 1882)
- Antinephele camerounensis Clark, 1937
- Antinephele marcida Holland, 1893
- Atemnora westermannii (Boisduval, 1875)
- Basiothia aureata (Karsch, 1891)
- Basiothia charis (Boisduval, 1875)
- Callosphingia circe (Fawcett, 1915)
- Centroctena imitans (Butler, 1882)
- Centroctena rutherfordi (Druce, 1882)
- Ceridia mira Rothschild & Jordan, 1903
- Chaerocina dohertyi Rothschild & Jordan, 1903
- Chloroclanis virescens (Butler, 1882)
- Coelonia fulvinotata (Butler, 1875)
- Daphnis nerii (Linnaeus, 1758)
- Dovania poecila Rothschild & Jordan, 1903
- Ellenbeckia monospila Rothschild & Jordan, 1903
- Euchloron megaera (Linnaeus, 1758)
- Falcatula falcata (Rothschild & Jordan, 1903)
- Hippotion aporodes Rothschild & Jordan, 1912
- Hippotion balsaminae (Walker, 1856)
- Hippotion chloris Rothschild & Jordan, 1907
- Hippotion dexippus Fawcett, 1915
- Hippotion eson (Cramer, 1779)
- Hippotion irregularis (Walker, 1856)
- Hippotion moorei Jordan, 1926
- Hippotion osiris (Dalman, 1823)
- Hippotion rebeli Rothschild & Jordan, 1903
- Hippotion rosae (Butler, 1882)
- Hippotion roseipennis (Butler, 1882)
- Hippotion socotrensis (Rebel, 1899)
- Hippotion stigma (Rothschild & Jordan, 1903)
- Leucostrophus alterhirundo d'Abrera, 1987
- Likoma apicalis Rothschild & Jordan, 1903
- Likoma crenata Rothschild & Jordan, 1907
- Lophostethus dumolinii (Angas, 1849)
- Macroglossum trochilus (Hübner, 1823)
- Macropoliana ferax (Rothschild & Jordan, 1916)
- Macropoliana natalensis (Butler, 1875)
- Microclanis erlangeri (Rothschild & Jordan, 1903)
- Neoclanis basalis (Walker, 1866)
- Neopolyptychus compar (Rothschild & Jordan, 1903)
- Neopolyptychus serrator (Jordan, 1929)
- Nephele accentifera (Palisot de Beauvois, 1821)
- Nephele aequivalens (Walker, 1856)
- Nephele bipartita Butler, 1878
- Nephele comma Hopffer, 1857
- Nephele discifera Karsch, 1891
- Nephele funebris (Fabricius, 1793)
- Nephele monostigma Clark, 1925
- Nephele rosae Butler, 1875
- Nephele xylina Rothschild & Jordan, 1910
- Platysphinx constrigilis (Walker, 1869)
- Poliana buchholzi (Plötz, 1880)
- Poliana micra Rothschild & Jordan, 1903
- Poliana wintgensi (Strand, 1910)
- Poliodes roseicornis Rothschild & Jordan, 1903
- Polyptychoides digitatus (Karsch, 1891)
- Polyptychoides erosus (Jordan, 1923)
- Polyptychoides grayii (Walker, 1856)
- Polyptychus affinis Rothschild & Jordan, 1903
- Praedora leucophaea Rothschild & Jordan, 1903
- Praedora marshalli Rothschild & Jordan, 1903
- Pseudoclanis kenyae Clark, 1928
- Pseudoclanis postica (Walker, 1856)
- Rhodafra marshalli Rothschild & Jordan, 1903
- Rufoclanis fulgurans (Rothschild & Jordan, 1903)
- Rufoclanis numosae (Wallengren, 1860)
- Temnora albilinea Rothschild, 1904
- Temnora crenulata (Holland, 1893)
- Temnora curtula Rothschild & Jordan, 1908
- Temnora eranga (Holland, 1889)
- Temnora iapygoides (Holland, 1889)
- Temnora mirabilis Talbot, 1932
- Temnora plagiata Walker, 1856
- Temnora pseudopylas (Rothschild, 1894)
- Temnora pylades Rothschild & Jordan, 1903
- Temnora spiritus (Holland, 1893)
- Temnora subapicalis Rothschild & Jordan, 1903
- Temnora zantus (Herrich-Schäffer, 1854)
- Theretra monteironis (Butler, 1882)
- Xanthopan morganii (Walker, 1856)

== Thyrididae ==
- Arniocera albiguttata Talbot, 1928
- Arniocera amoena Jordan, 1907
- Arniocera auriguttata Hopffer, 1857
- Arniocera cyanoxantha (Mabille, 1893)
- Arniocera ericata Butler, 1898
- Arniocera erythropyga (Wallengren, 1860)
- Arniocera imperialis Butler, 1898
- Arniocera poecila Jordan, 1907
- Arniocera sternecki Rogenhofer, 1891
- Cecidothyris parobifera Whalley, 1971
- Chrysotypus vittiferalis (Gaede, 1917)
- Dilophura caudata (Jordan, 1907)
- Dysodia fenestratella Warren, 1900
- Dysodia fumida Whalley, 1968
- Dysodia intermedia (Walker, 1865)
- Dysodia lutescens Whalley, 1968
- Hapana carcealis Whalley, 1971
- Hypolamprus quaesitus Whalley, 1971
- Kuja carcassoni Whalley, 1971
- Marmax vicaria (Walker, 1854)
- Nemea betousalis (Gaede, 1917)
- Netrocera basalis Jordan, 1907
- Netrocera diffinis Jordan, 1907
- Netrocera hemichrysa (Hampson, 1910)
- Netrocera setioides Felder, 1874
- Striglina minutula (Saalmüller, 1880)

== Tineidae ==
- Acridotarsa melipecta (Meyrick, 1915)
- Archemitra iorrhoa Meyrick, 1920
- Ceratophaga ethadopa (Meyrick, 1938)
- Ceratophaga vastellus (Zeller, 1852)
- Ceratophaga xanthastis (Meyrick, 1908)
- Cylicobathra argocoma (Meyrick, 1914)
- Cylicobathra chionarga Meyrick, 1920
- Dinica aspirans (Meyrick, 1920)
- Edosa crassivalva (Gozmány, 1968)
- Edosa melanostoma (Meyrick, 1908)
- Erechthias pentatypa (Meyrick, 1920)
- Hapsifera glebata Meyrick, 1908
- Hapsifera ignobilis Meyrick, 1919
- Hapsifera lithocentra Meyrick, 1920
- Hapsifera nidicola Meyrick, 1935
- Hapsifera ochroptila Meyrick, 1908
- Hapsifera pachypsaltis Gozmány, 1965
- Hapsifera paraglareosa Gozmány, 1968
- Hapsifera revoluta Meyrick, 1914
- Hapsifera rhodoptila Meyrick, 1920
- Hapsifera septica Meyrick, 1908
- Leptozancla talaroscia Meyrick, 1920
- Machaeropteris magnifica Gozmány, 1968
- Mitrogona laevis Meyrick, 1920
- Monopis liparota Meyrick, 1920
- Monopis rutilicostella (Stainton, 1860)
- Myrmecozela isopsamma Meyrick, 1920
- Opogona anisacta Meyrick, 1920
- Opogona tanydora Meyrick, 1920
- Pachypsaltis pachystoma (Meyrick, 1920)
- Pelecystola decorata Meyrick, 1920
- Perissomastix breviberbis (Meyrick, 1933)
- Perissomastix catapulta Gozmány, 1968
- Perissomastix marcescens (Meyrick, 1908)
- Perissomastix ruwenzorica Gozmány & Vári, 1973
- Phalloscardia semiumbrata (Meyrick, 1920)
- Phthoropoea oenochares (Meyrick, 1920)
- Pitharcha marmorata Gozmány, 1968
- Tiquadra lichenea Walsingham, 1897
- Tracheloteina eccephala (Meyrick, 1914)
- Wegneria scaeozona (Meyrick, 1920)

== Tischeriidae ==
- Coptotriche kenyensis Mey, 2010

== Tortricidae ==
- Accra plumbeana Razowski, 1966
- Acleris kinangopana Razowski, 1964
- Acleris thylacitis (Meyrick, 1920)
- Actihema hemiacta (Meyrick, 1920)
- Actihema msituni Aarvik, 2010
- Actihema simpsonae Aarvik, 2010
- Aethes illota (Meyrick, 1914)
- Afroploce karsholti Aarvik, 2004
- Afroploce turiana Aarvik, 2004
- Apotoforma kakamegae Razowski, 2012
- Bactra sinassula Diakonoff, 1963
- Bactra stagnicolana Zeller, 1852
- Cnephasia galeotis Meyrick, 1920
- Cnephasia incinerata Meyrick, 1920
- Cnephasia melliflua Meyrick, 1914
- Cnephasia taganista Meyrick, 1920
- Cochylimorpha exoterica (Meyrick, 1924)
- Cornesia arabuco Razowski, 2012
- Cornesia molytes Razowski, 1993
- Cosmorrhyncha acrocosma (Meyrick, 1908)
- Cosmorrhyncha microcosma Aarvik, 2004
- Crocidosema plebejana Zeller, 1847
- Cryptaspasma caryothicta (Meyrick, 1920)
- Cryptaspasma phycitinana Aarvik, 2005
- Cryptaspasma subtilis Diakonoff, 1959
- Ctenopseustis haplodryas Meyrick, 1920
- Cydia chrysocosma (Meyrick, 1920)
- Cydia leptogramma (Meyrick, 1913)
- Eccopsis aegidia (Meyrick, 1932)
- Eccopsis agassizi Aarvik, 2004
- Eccopsis deprinsi Aarvik, 2004
- Eccopsis incultana (Walker, 1863)
- Eccopsis nebulana Walsingham, 1891
- Eccopsis praecedens Walsingham, 1897
- Eccopsis tucki Aarvik, 2004
- Eccopsis wahlbergiana Zeller, 1852
- Epiblema riciniata (Meyrick, 1911)
- Epichorista benevola Meyrick, 1920
- Epichorista mesosceptra Meyrick, 1920
- Epichorista passaleuta Meyrick, 1920
- Epichorista prodigiosa Meyrick, 1920
- Epichorista psoropis Meyrick, 1920
- Epichoristodes licmaea (Meyrick, 1920)
- Eucosma antirrhoa Meyrick, 1920
- Eucosma cyphospila Meyrick, 1920
- Eucosma inscita Meyrick, 1913
- Eucosma metagypsa Meyrick, 1920
- Eucosma pharangodes Meyrick, 1920
- Eucosma superciliosa Meyrick, 1920
- Eugnosta misella Razowski, 1993
- Eugnosta percnoptila (Meyrick, 1933)
- Eupoecilia kruegeriana Razowski, 1993
- Falseuncaria aberdarensis Aarvik, 2010
- Fulcrifera halmyris (Meyrick, 1909)
- Fulcrifera periculosa (Meyrick, 1913)
- Gypsonoma paradelta (Meyrick, 1925)
- Leguminovora glycinivorella (Matsumura, 1898)
- Lobesia harmonia (Meyrick, 1908)
- Megalota archana Aarvik, 2004
- Megalota purpurana Aarvik, 2004
- Megalota rhopalitis (Meyrick, 1920)
- Metamesia elegans (Walsingham, 1881)
- Metendothenia balanacma (Meyrick, 1914)
- Multiquaestia agassizi Aarvik & Karisch, 2009
- Multiquaestia dallastai Aarvik & Karisch, 2009
- Olethreutes clavifera (Meyrick, 1920)
- Olethreutes nimbosa (Meyrick, 1920)
- Orilesa mediocris (Meyrick, 1914)
- Panegyra sokokana Razowski, 2012
- Paraccra chorogiae Razowski, 2012
- Paraeccopsis insellata (Meyrick, 1920)
- Phtheochroa aarviki Razowski & J. W. Brown, 2012
- Phtheochroa kenyana Aarvik, 2010
- Procrica intrepida (Meyrick, 1912)
- Procrica parva Razowski, 2002
- Sycacantha nereidopa (Meyrick, 1927)
- Tortrix chalicodes Meyrick, 1920
- Tortrix dinota Meyrick, 1918
- Tortrix exedra Meyrick, 1920
- Tortrix mitrota Meyrick, 1920
- Tortrix poliochra Meyrick, 1920
- Tortrix triadelpha Meyrick, 1920
- Xenosocia elgonica Karisch, 2008

== Uraniidae ==
- Dirades angulifera Warren, 1902
- Epiplema carbo Warren, 1902
- Epiplema dohertyi Warren, 1904
- Epiplema negro Warren, 1901
- Epiplema nymphaeata Warren, 1902
- Epiplema perpulchra Warren, 1902
- Epiplema semipicta Warren, 1904
- Heteroplema dependens Warren, 1902
- Leucoplema ansorgei (Warren, 1901)
- Leucoplema triumbrata (Warren, 1902)
- Urapteroides recurvata Warren, 1898

== Xyloryctidae ==
- Scythris invisa Meyrick, 1920

== Zygaenidae ==
- Astyloneura biplagata (Bethune-Baker, 1911)
- Astyloneura cupreitincta (Hampson, 1920)
- Astyloneura difformis (Jordan, 1907)
- Epiorna abessynica (Koch, 1865)
- Saliunca aenescens Hampson, 1920
- Saliunca fulviceps Hampson, 1920
- Saliunca kamilila Bethune-Baker, 1911
- Saliunca meruana Aurivillius, 1910
