= Patissa atrilinealis =

Scientific classification
- Kingdom: Animalia
- Phylum: Arthropoda
- Class: Insecta
- Order: Lepidoptera
- Family: Crambidae
- Genus: Patissa
- Species: P. atrilinealis

Binomial name
- Patissa atrilinealis Hampson, 1919

Species of moth

Patissa atrilinealis is a moth in the family Crambidae. It was described by George Hampson in 1919. It is found in Kenya.

== See also ==
- List of moths of Kenya
