= Scopula accentuata =

Scientific classification
- Kingdom: Animalia
- Phylum: Arthropoda
- Clade: Pancrustacea
- Class: Insecta
- Order: Lepidoptera
- Family: Geometridae
- Genus: Scopula
- Species: S. accentuata

Binomial name
- Scopula accentuata (Guenée, [1858])

Synonyms
- Acidalia accentuata Guenee, 1858; Scopula accenturiata Walker, 1861 [misspelling of accentuata]; Acidalia dentigerata Walker, 1863; Scopula exgiuaria Prout, 1932 [misspelling of exiguaria]; Boarmia exiguaria Walker, 1860; Scopula exiquaria Janse, 1917 [misspelling of exiguaria]; Acidalia rudisaria Walker, 1861

Species of geometer moths in subfamily Sterrhinae

Scopula accentuata is a moth of the family Geometridae. It is found in the Democratic Republic of Congo, Kenya and South Africa.
