= Asura spinata =

Scientific classification
- Domain: Eukaryota
- Kingdom: Animalia
- Phylum: Arthropoda
- Class: Insecta
- Order: Lepidoptera
- Superfamily: Noctuoidea
- Family: Erebidae
- Subfamily: Arctiinae
- Genus: Asura
- Species: A. spinata

Binomial name
- Asura spinata Kühne, 2007

Synonyms
- Tumicla spinata (Kühne, 2007)

Species of moth

Asura spinata is a moth of the family Erebidae. It was described by Lars Kühne in 2007. It is found in Kenya and the Democratic Republic of the Congo.
