= Elachista kakamegensis =

Scientific classification
- Kingdom: Animalia
- Phylum: Arthropoda
- Clade: Pancrustacea
- Class: Insecta
- Order: Lepidoptera
- Family: Elachistidae
- Genus: Elachista
- Species: E. kakamegensis

Binomial name
- Elachista kakamegensis Sruoga & De Prins, 2009

Species of moth

Elachista kakamegensis is a moth of the family Elachistidae that is endemic to Kenya.

The wingspan is about 5.3 mm for males and 6.8 mm for females.

== Etymology ==
The species name refers to Kakamega, the type locality.
