= Phyllonorycter tsavensis =

Scientific classification
- Domain: Eukaryota
- Kingdom: Animalia
- Phylum: Arthropoda
- Class: Insecta
- Order: Lepidoptera
- Family: Gracillariidae
- Genus: Phyllonorycter
- Species: P. tsavensis

Binomial name
- Phyllonorycter tsavensis de Prins, 2012

Species of moth

Phyllonorycter tsavensis is a moth of the family Gracillariidae. It is found in Kenya and South Africa. The habitat consists of east African savannah.

The length of the forewings is 2.2 mm.
