= Scopula candidaria =

Scientific classification
- Domain: Eukaryota
- Kingdom: Animalia
- Phylum: Arthropoda
- Class: Insecta
- Order: Lepidoptera
- Family: Geometridae
- Genus: Scopula
- Species: S. candidaria

Binomial name
- Scopula candidaria (Warren, 1902)

Synonyms
- Pylarge candidaria Warren, 1902

Species of geometer moth in subfamily Sterrhinae

Scopula candidaria is a moth of the family Geometridae. It was described by Warren in 1902. It is found in Kenya, the Democratic Republic of Congo and Uganda.
