= Ethmia ditreta =

Scientific classification
- Kingdom: Animalia
- Phylum: Arthropoda
- Class: Insecta
- Order: Lepidoptera
- Family: Depressariidae
- Genus: Ethmia
- Species: E. ditreta

Binomial name
- Ethmia ditreta Meyrick, 1920

Synonyms
- Ethmia arabica Amsel, 1961

Species of moth

Ethmia ditreta is a moth in the family Depressariidae. It is found in Kenya and Yemen.
