= Eupithecia anguinata =

Scientific classification
- Domain: Eukaryota
- Kingdom: Animalia
- Phylum: Arthropoda
- Class: Insecta
- Order: Lepidoptera
- Family: Geometridae
- Genus: Eupithecia
- Species: E. anguinata

Binomial name
- Eupithecia anguinata (Warren, 1902)

Synonyms
- Tephroclystia anguinata Warren, 1902

Species of moth

Eupithecia anguinata is a moth in the family Geometridae. It is found in Kenya.
