= Scopula spoliata =

Scientific classification
- Kingdom: Animalia
- Phylum: Arthropoda
- Class: Insecta
- Order: Lepidoptera
- Family: Geometridae
- Genus: Scopula
- Species: S. spoliata

Binomial name
- Scopula spoliata (Walker, 1861)

Synonyms
- Acidalia spoliata Walker, 1861; Acidalia pygarata Wallengren, 1863

Species of geometer moth in subfamily Sterrhinae

Scopula spoliata is a moth of the family Geometridae. First described by Francis Walker in 1861, it is found in Kenya, Malawi, Somalia, South Africa and Zambia.
