= Pyrausta sanguifusalis =

Scientific classification
- Kingdom: Animalia
- Phylum: Arthropoda
- Class: Insecta
- Order: Lepidoptera
- Family: Crambidae
- Genus: Pyrausta
- Species: P. sanguifusalis

Binomial name
- Pyrausta sanguifusalis Hampson, 1913

Species of moth

Pyrausta sanguifusalis is a moth in the family Crambidae. It was described by George Hampson in 1913. It is found in Kenya and Tanzania.
