= Phyllonorycter kazuri =

Scientific classification
- Domain: Eukaryota
- Kingdom: Animalia
- Phylum: Arthropoda
- Class: Insecta
- Order: Lepidoptera
- Family: Gracillariidae
- Genus: Phyllonorycter
- Species: P. kazuri

Binomial name
- Phyllonorycter kazuri de Prins, 2012

Species of moth

Phyllonorycter kazuri is a moth of the family Gracillariidae. It is found in eastern Kenya where its habitat consists primarily of savannah, at an altitude of about 500 meters.

== Etymology ==
The specific epithet means "small and beautiful" in Swahili.
