= Scopula cassioides =

Scientific classification
- Kingdom: Animalia
- Phylum: Arthropoda
- Clade: Pancrustacea
- Class: Insecta
- Order: Lepidoptera
- Family: Geometridae
- Genus: Scopula
- Species: S. cassioides

Binomial name
- Scopula cassioides Prout, 1932

Species of geometer moth in subfamily Sterrhinae

Scopula cassioides is a moth of the family Geometridae. It was described by Prout in 1932. It is endemic to Kenya.
