= Phyllonorycter ocimellus =

Scientific classification
- Domain: Eukaryota
- Kingdom: Animalia
- Phylum: Arthropoda
- Class: Insecta
- Order: Lepidoptera
- Family: Gracillariidae
- Genus: Phyllonorycter
- Species: P. ocimellus

Binomial name
- Phyllonorycter ocimellus de Prins, 2012

Species of moth

Phyllonorycter ocimellus is a moth of the family Gracillariidae. It is found in eastern and western Kenya in humid, secondary forests at an altitude of about 1,600 meters.

The length of the forewings is 3.1–3.4 mm.
