= Phyllonorycter hibiscola =

Scientific classification
- Domain: Eukaryota
- Kingdom: Animalia
- Phylum: Arthropoda
- Class: Insecta
- Order: Lepidoptera
- Family: Gracillariidae
- Genus: Phyllonorycter
- Species: P. hibiscola

Binomial name
- Phyllonorycter hibiscola de Prins, 2012

Species of moth

Phyllonorycter hibiscola is a moth of the family Gracillariidae. It is found in western Kenya in primary Guineo-Congolian rain forest.

The length of the forewings is 2.1–2.4 mm.
