= Scopula dissonans =

Scientific classification
- Domain: Eukaryota
- Kingdom: Animalia
- Phylum: Arthropoda
- Class: Insecta
- Order: Lepidoptera
- Family: Geometridae
- Genus: Scopula
- Species: S. dissonans

Binomial name
- Scopula dissonans (Warren, 1897)

Synonyms
- Craspedia dissonans Warren, 1897

Species of geometer moth in subfamily Sterrhinae

Scopula dissonans is a moth of the family Geometridae. It was described by William Warren in 1897. It is found in the Democratic Republic of the Congo, Ethiopia, Kenya, Nigeria, South Africa, Tanzania and Uganda.
