= Ethmia bicolorella =

Scientific classification
- Kingdom: Animalia
- Phylum: Arthropoda
- Class: Insecta
- Order: Lepidoptera
- Family: Depressariidae
- Genus: Ethmia
- Species: E. bicolorella

Binomial name
- Ethmia bicolorella Guenée, 1879

Species of moth

Ethmia bicolorella is a moth in the family Depressariidae. It is found in Kenya.
