= Eupithecia mendosaria =

Scientific classification
- Domain: Eukaryota
- Kingdom: Animalia
- Phylum: Arthropoda
- Class: Insecta
- Order: Lepidoptera
- Family: Geometridae
- Genus: Eupithecia
- Species: E. mendosaria

Binomial name
- Eupithecia mendosaria (C. Swinhoe, 1904)

Synonyms
- Tephroclystia mendosaria C. Swinhoe, 1904

Species of moth

Eupithecia mendosaria is a moth in the family Geometridae first described by Charles Swinhoe in 1904. It is found in Ethiopia, Kenya and South Africa.
