= Eupithecia orbaria =

Scientific classification
- Domain: Eukaryota
- Kingdom: Animalia
- Phylum: Arthropoda
- Class: Insecta
- Order: Lepidoptera
- Family: Geometridae
- Genus: Eupithecia
- Species: E. orbaria

Binomial name
- Eupithecia orbaria (C. Swinhoe, 1904)

Synonyms
- Tephroclystia orbaria C. Swinhoe, 1904

Species of moth

Eupithecia orbaria is a moth in the family Geometridae first described by Charles Swinhoe in 1904. It is found in Kenya.
