= Eilema aurantisquamata =

Scientific classification
- Kingdom: Animalia
- Phylum: Arthropoda
- Clade: Pancrustacea
- Class: Insecta
- Order: Lepidoptera
- Superfamily: Noctuoidea
- Family: Erebidae
- Subfamily: Arctiinae
- Genus: Eilema
- Species: E. aurantisquamata

Binomial name
- Eilema aurantisquamata (Hampson, 1918)

Synonyms
- Ilema aurantisquamata Hampson, 1918

Species of moth

Eilema aurantisquamata is a moth of the subfamily Arctiinae. It is found in Kenya and Malawi.
