= Phyllonorycter turensis =

Scientific classification
- Domain: Eukaryota
- Kingdom: Animalia
- Phylum: Arthropoda
- Class: Insecta
- Order: Lepidoptera
- Family: Gracillariidae
- Genus: Phyllonorycter
- Species: P. turensis

Binomial name
- Phyllonorycter turensis de Prins, 2012

Species of moth

Phyllonorycter turensis is a moth of the family Gracillariidae. It is found in the savannah of the Rift Valley in Kenya.

The length of the forewings is 2.81 mm.
