= Ethmia cirrhosoma =

Scientific classification
- Kingdom: Animalia
- Phylum: Arthropoda
- Class: Insecta
- Order: Lepidoptera
- Family: Depressariidae
- Genus: Ethmia
- Species: E. cirrhosoma

Binomial name
- Ethmia cirrhosoma Meyrick, 1920

Species of moth

Ethmia cirrhosoma is a moth in the family Depressariidae. It is found in Kenya.
