= Scopula acyma =

Scientific classification
- Domain: Eukaryota
- Kingdom: Animalia
- Phylum: Arthropoda
- Class: Insecta
- Order: Lepidoptera
- Family: Geometridae
- Genus: Scopula
- Species: S. acyma

Binomial name
- Scopula acyma Prout, 1932

Species of geometer moths in subfamily Sterrhinae

Scopula acyma is a moth of the family Geometridae. It was described by Prout in 1932. It is endemic to Kenya.
