= Phyllonorycter acutulus =

Scientific classification
- Domain: Eukaryota
- Kingdom: Animalia
- Phylum: Arthropoda
- Class: Insecta
- Order: Lepidoptera
- Family: Gracillariidae
- Genus: Phyllonorycter
- Species: P. acutulus

Binomial name
- Phyllonorycter acutulus de Prins, 2012

Species of moth

Phyllonorycter acutulus is a moth of the family Gracillariidae. It is found in Kenya in high altitude alpine meadows and low shrub zone in the eastern part of the Albertine Rift Mountains.

The length of the forewings is 3.56 mm.
