= Scopula technessa =

Scientific classification
- Domain: Eukaryota
- Kingdom: Animalia
- Phylum: Arthropoda
- Class: Insecta
- Order: Lepidoptera
- Family: Geometridae
- Genus: Scopula
- Species: S. technessa

Binomial name
- Scopula technessa Prout, 1932

Species of geometer moth in subfamily Sterrhinae

Scopula technessa is a moth of the family Geometridae. It is found in Kenya. It was first described by Prout in 1932.
