= Eupithecia oblongipennis =

Scientific classification
- Domain: Eukaryota
- Kingdom: Animalia
- Phylum: Arthropoda
- Class: Insecta
- Order: Lepidoptera
- Family: Geometridae
- Genus: Eupithecia
- Species: E. oblongipennis

Binomial name
- Eupithecia oblongipennis (Warren, 1902)

Synonyms
- Chloroclystis oblongipennis Warren, 1902

Species of moth

Eupithecia oblongipennis is a moth in the family Geometridae. It is found in Kenya.
