= Eupithecia amphiplex =

Scientific classification
- Kingdom: Animalia
- Phylum: Arthropoda
- Clade: Pancrustacea
- Class: Insecta
- Order: Lepidoptera
- Family: Geometridae
- Genus: Eupithecia
- Species: E. amphiplex

Binomial name
- Eupithecia amphiplex Prout L.B., 1932

Species of moth

Eupithecia amphiplex is a moth in the family Geometridae. It is found in the Democratic Republic of Congo and Kenya.
