= Phyllonorycter rongensis =

Scientific classification
- Domain: Eukaryota
- Kingdom: Animalia
- Phylum: Arthropoda
- Class: Insecta
- Order: Lepidoptera
- Family: Gracillariidae
- Genus: Phyllonorycter
- Species: P. rongensis

Binomial name
- Phyllonorycter rongensis de Prins, 2012

Species of moth

Phyllonorycter rongensis is a moth of the family Gracillariidae. It is found in the Albertine Rift valley in Kenya.

The length of the forewings is 2.7 mm.
