= Phyllonorycter lantanae =

Scientific classification
- Kingdom: Animalia
- Phylum: Arthropoda
- Clade: Pancrustacea
- Class: Insecta
- Order: Lepidoptera
- Family: Gracillariidae
- Genus: Phyllonorycter
- Species: P. lantanae

Binomial name
- Phyllonorycter lantanae (Vári, 1961)

Synonyms
- Lithocolletis lantanae Vári, 1961

Species of moth

Phyllonorycter lantanae is a moth of the family Gracillariidae. It is known from South Africa and Kenya.

The length of the forewings is 1.9 mm.
