= Scopula crawshayi =

Scientific classification
- Domain: Eukaryota
- Kingdom: Animalia
- Phylum: Arthropoda
- Class: Insecta
- Order: Lepidoptera
- Family: Geometridae
- Genus: Scopula
- Species: S. crawshayi

Binomial name
- Scopula crawshayi Prout, 1932

Species of geometer moth in subfamily Sterrhinae

Scopula crawshayi is a moth of the family Geometridae. It was named by Prout in 1932. It is endemic to Kenya.
