= Scopula vitiosaria =

Scientific classification
- Kingdom: Animalia
- Phylum: Arthropoda
- Class: Insecta
- Order: Lepidoptera
- Family: Geometridae
- Genus: Scopula
- Species: S. vitiosaria

Binomial name
- Scopula vitiosaria (C. Swinhoe, 1904)

Synonyms
- Emmiltis vitiosaria C. Swinhoe, 1904

Species of geometer moth in subfamily Sterrhinae

Scopula vitiosaria is a moth of the family Geometridae first described by Charles Swinhoe in 1904. It is found in Kenya.
