= Scopula lactea =

Scientific classification
- Domain: Eukaryota
- Kingdom: Animalia
- Phylum: Arthropoda
- Class: Insecta
- Order: Lepidoptera
- Family: Geometridae
- Genus: Scopula
- Species: S. lactea

Binomial name
- Scopula lactea (Warren, 1900)

Synonyms
- Leucoxena lactea Warren, 1900

Species of geometer moth in subfamily Sterrhinae

Scopula lactea is a moth of the family Geometridae. It was described by William Warren in 1900. It is endemic to Kenya.

== Taxonomy ==
Scopula lactea is a junior secondary homonym of Lycauges lactea described by Arthur Gardiner Butler in 1879 and requires a replacement name.
