= Scopula atricapilla =

Scientific classification
- Domain: Eukaryota
- Kingdom: Animalia
- Phylum: Arthropoda
- Class: Insecta
- Order: Lepidoptera
- Family: Geometridae
- Genus: Scopula
- Species: S. atricapilla

Binomial name
- Scopula atricapilla Prout, 1934

Species of geometer moth in subfamily Sterrhinae

Scopula atricapilla is a moth of the family Geometridae. It is found in the Democratic Republic of Congo, Kenya and Uganda.

== Subspecies ==
- Scopula atricapilla atricapilla
- Scopula atricapilla harithensis Wiltshire, 1990
