= Pyrausta sthenialis =

Scientific classification
- Domain: Eukaryota
- Kingdom: Animalia
- Phylum: Arthropoda
- Class: Insecta
- Order: Lepidoptera
- Family: Crambidae
- Genus: Pyrausta
- Species: P. sthenialis

Binomial name
- Pyrausta sthenialis Hampson in Poulton, 1916

Species of moth

Pyrausta sthenialis is a moth in the family Crambidae. It was described by George Hampson in 1916. It is found in Kenya.
