= Eilema intermixta =

Scientific classification
- Domain: Eukaryota
- Kingdom: Animalia
- Phylum: Arthropoda
- Class: Insecta
- Order: Lepidoptera
- Superfamily: Noctuoidea
- Family: Erebidae
- Subfamily: Arctiinae
- Genus: Eilema
- Species: E. intermixta

Binomial name
- Eilema intermixta Kühne, 2007

Synonyms
- Lepidilema intermixta (Kühne, 2007)

Species of moth

Eilema intermixta is a moth of the subfamily Arctiinae. It was described by Lars Kühne in 2007. It is found in Kenya. The species formerly known as Katha intermixta in India and Sri Lanka are known to be the same species, but evidence of this is not documented.
