= Phyllonorycter obandai =

Scientific classification
- Domain: Eukaryota
- Kingdom: Animalia
- Phylum: Arthropoda
- Class: Insecta
- Order: Lepidoptera
- Family: Gracillariidae
- Genus: Phyllonorycter
- Species: P. obandai

Binomial name
- Phyllonorycter obandai De Prins & Mozuraitis, 2006

Species of moth

Phyllonorycter obandai is a moth of the family Gracillariidae. It is known from the Rift Valley in the Central and Western provinces of Kenya.

The length of the forewings is 3–3.3 millimetres (0.12–0.13 in). Adults are on wing from early December to early April.
