= Scopula rufisalsa =

Scientific classification
- Domain: Eukaryota
- Kingdom: Animalia
- Phylum: Arthropoda
- Class: Insecta
- Order: Lepidoptera
- Family: Geometridae
- Genus: Scopula
- Species: S. rufisalsa

Binomial name
- Scopula rufisalsa (Warren, 1897)

Synonyms
- Induna rufisalsa Warren, 1897

Species of geometer moth in subfamily Sterrhinae

Scopula rufisalsa is a moth of the family Geometridae. It is found in Kenya, South Africa and Zambia.

== Subspecies ==
- Scopula rufisalsa rufisalsa (South Africa)
- Scopula rufisalsa pallidisalsa Prout, 1932 (Kenya)
