= Eupithecia tetraglena =

Scientific classification
- Kingdom: Animalia
- Phylum: Arthropoda
- Clade: Pancrustacea
- Class: Insecta
- Order: Lepidoptera
- Family: Geometridae
- Genus: Eupithecia
- Species: E. tetraglena

Binomial name
- Eupithecia tetraglena L. B. Prout, 1932

Species of moth

Eupithecia tetraglena is a moth in the family Geometridae. It is found in Kenya.

== Subspecies ==
- Eupithecia tetraglena tetraglena
- Eupithecia tetraglena amplior D. S. Fletcher, 1958
