= Lecithocera sceptrarcha =

Scientific classification
- Kingdom: Animalia
- Phylum: Arthropoda
- Class: Insecta
- Order: Lepidoptera
- Family: Lecithoceridae
- Genus: Lecithocera
- Species: L. sceptrarcha

Binomial name
- Lecithocera sceptrarcha Meyrick, 1920

Species of moth in the genus Lecithocera

Lecithocera sceptrarcha is a moth in the family Lecithoceridae. It was described by Edward Meyrick in 1920. It is found in Kenya.
