= Eupithecia ecplyta =

Scientific classification
- Kingdom: Animalia
- Phylum: Arthropoda
- Clade: Pancrustacea
- Class: Insecta
- Order: Lepidoptera
- Family: Geometridae
- Genus: Eupithecia
- Species: E. ecplyta

Binomial name
- Eupithecia ecplyta Prout L.B., 1932

Species of moth

Eupithecia ecplyta is a moth in the family Geometridae. It is found in Kenya.
