= Phyllonorycter silvicola =

Scientific classification
- Domain: Eukaryota
- Kingdom: Animalia
- Phylum: Arthropoda
- Class: Insecta
- Order: Lepidoptera
- Family: Gracillariidae
- Genus: Phyllonorycter
- Species: P. silvicola

Binomial name
- Phyllonorycter silvicola de Prins, 2012

Species of moth

Phyllonorycter silvicola is a moth of the family Gracillariidae. It is found in western Kenya at the eastern edge of primary rainforests intermixed with savannah vegetation.

The length of the forewings is 2.7 mm.
