= Eupithecia semiflavata =

Scientific classification
- Domain: Eukaryota
- Kingdom: Animalia
- Phylum: Arthropoda
- Class: Insecta
- Order: Lepidoptera
- Family: Geometridae
- Genus: Eupithecia
- Species: E. semiflavata

Binomial name
- Eupithecia semiflavata (Warren, 1902)

Synonyms
- Tephroclystia semiflavata Warren, 1902

Species of moth

Eupithecia semiflavata is a moth in the family Geometridae. It is found in Kenya.
