= Scopula alma =

Scientific classification
- Domain: Eukaryota
- Kingdom: Animalia
- Phylum: Arthropoda
- Class: Insecta
- Order: Lepidoptera
- Family: Geometridae
- Genus: Scopula
- Species: S. alma

Binomial name
- Scopula alma Prout, 1920

Species of geometer moth in subfamily Sterrhinae

Scopula alma is a moth of the family Geometridae. It was described by Louis B. Prout in 1920. It is found in Kenya, Uganda, and South Africa.

The wingspan is 19–21 mm (0.75–0.83 in) for males.
