= Pyrausta bostralis =

Scientific classification
- Kingdom: Animalia
- Phylum: Arthropoda
- Class: Insecta
- Order: Lepidoptera
- Family: Crambidae
- Genus: Pyrausta
- Species: P. bostralis

Binomial name
- Pyrausta bostralis (Hampson, 1919)

Synonyms
- Argyria bostralis Hampson, 1919

Species of moth

Pyrausta bostralis is a moth in the family Crambidae. It was described by George Hampson in 1919. It is found in Kenya.
