= Eupithecia psiadiata =

Scientific classification
- Domain: Eukaryota
- Kingdom: Animalia
- Phylum: Arthropoda
- Class: Insecta
- Order: Lepidoptera
- Family: Geometridae
- Genus: Eupithecia
- Species: E. psiadiata

Binomial name
- Eupithecia psiadiata Townsend, 1952

Species of moth

Eupithecia psiadiata is a moth in the family Geometridae. It is found in Kenya.

The larvae feed on Psiadia arabica.
