= Eupithecia immensa =

Scientific classification
- Domain: Eukaryota
- Kingdom: Animalia
- Phylum: Arthropoda
- Class: Insecta
- Order: Lepidoptera
- Family: Geometridae
- Genus: Eupithecia
- Species: E. immensa

Binomial name
- Eupithecia immensa (Warren, 1902)

Synonyms
- Tephroclystia immensa Warren, 1902

Species of moth

Eupithecia immensa is a moth in the family Geometridae. It is found in Kenya.
