= Amata dissimilis =

Scientific classification
- Domain: Eukaryota
- Kingdom: Animalia
- Phylum: Arthropoda
- Class: Insecta
- Order: Lepidoptera
- Superfamily: Noctuoidea
- Family: Erebidae
- Subfamily: Arctiinae
- Genus: Amata
- Species: A. dissimilis

Binomial name
- Amata dissimilis (Bethune-Baker, 1911)

Synonyms
- Syntomis dissimilis Bethune-Baker, 1911

Species of moth

Amata dissimilis is a moth of the family Erebidae. It was described by George Thomas Bethune-Baker in 1911. It is found in Kenya.
