= Phyllonorycter agassizi =

Scientific classification
- Domain: Eukaryota
- Kingdom: Animalia
- Phylum: Arthropoda
- Class: Insecta
- Order: Lepidoptera
- Family: Gracillariidae
- Genus: Phyllonorycter
- Species: P. agassizi

Binomial name
- Phyllonorycter agassizi de Prins, 2012

Species of moth

Phyllonorycter agassizi is a moth of the family Gracillariidae. It is found in Kenya in savannah areas.

The length of the forewings is 3.3 mm.
