= Eupithecia albistillata =

Scientific classification
- Kingdom: Animalia
- Phylum: Arthropoda
- Clade: Pancrustacea
- Class: Insecta
- Order: Lepidoptera
- Family: Geometridae
- Genus: Eupithecia
- Species: E. albistillata

Binomial name
- Eupithecia albistillata Prout L.B., 1932

Species of moth

Eupithecia albistillata is a moth in the family Geometridae. It is found in Kenya.
