= Pyrausta haematidalis =

Scientific classification
- Kingdom: Animalia
- Phylum: Arthropoda
- Clade: Pancrustacea
- Class: Insecta
- Order: Lepidoptera
- Family: Crambidae
- Genus: Pyrausta
- Species: P. haematidalis

Binomial name
- Pyrausta haematidalis Hampson, 1913

Species of moth

Pyrausta haematidalis is a moth in the family Crambidae. It was described by George Hampson in 1913. It is found in Kenya and South Africa.
