= Eupithecia perculsaria =

Scientific classification
- Domain: Eukaryota
- Kingdom: Animalia
- Phylum: Arthropoda
- Class: Insecta
- Order: Lepidoptera
- Family: Geometridae
- Genus: Eupithecia
- Species: E. perculsaria

Binomial name
- Eupithecia perculsaria (C. Swinhoe, 1904)

Synonyms
- Tephroclystia perculsaria C. Swinhoe, 1904

Species of moth

Eupithecia perculsaria is a moth in the family Geometridae. It is found in Kenya and South Africa.

== Subspecies ==
- Eupithecia perculsaria perculsaria
- Eupithecia perculsaria influa L. B. Prout, 1932
