= Scopula dapharia =

Scientific classification
- Domain: Eukaryota
- Kingdom: Animalia
- Phylum: Arthropoda
- Class: Insecta
- Order: Lepidoptera
- Family: Geometridae
- Genus: Scopula
- Species: S. dapharia

Binomial name
- Scopula dapharia (C. Swinhoe, 1904)

Synonyms
- Lycauges dapharia C. Swinhoe, 1904

Species of geometer moth in subfamily Sterrhinae

Scopula dapharia is a moth of the family Geometridae first described by Charles Swinhoe in 1904. It is found in Kenya.
