= Scopula sevandaria =

Scientific classification
- Domain: Eukaryota
- Kingdom: Animalia
- Phylum: Arthropoda
- Class: Insecta
- Order: Lepidoptera
- Family: Geometridae
- Genus: Scopula
- Species: S. sevandaria

Binomial name
- Scopula sevandaria (C. Swinhoe, 1904)

Synonyms
- Lycauges sevandaria C. Swinhoe, 1904; Emmiltis peararia C. Swinhoe, 1904

Species of geometer moth in subfamily Sterrhinae

Scopula sevandaria is a moth of the family Geometridae first described by Charles Swinhoe in 1904. It is found in Kenya, Tanzania and Uganda.
