= Eupithecia mecodaedala =

Scientific classification
- Kingdom: Animalia
- Phylum: Arthropoda
- Clade: Pancrustacea
- Class: Insecta
- Order: Lepidoptera
- Family: Geometridae
- Genus: Eupithecia
- Species: E. mecodaedala

Binomial name
- Eupithecia mecodaedala L. B. Prout, 1932

Species of moth

Eupithecia mecodaedala is a moth in the family Geometridae. It is found in Kenya.

== Subspecies ==
- Eupithecia mecodaedala mecodaedala
- Eupithecia mecodaedala holmi D. S. Fletcher, 1958
