= Eupithecia proflua =

Scientific classification
- Kingdom: Animalia
- Phylum: Arthropoda
- Clade: Pancrustacea
- Class: Insecta
- Order: Lepidoptera
- Family: Geometridae
- Genus: Eupithecia
- Species: E. proflua

Binomial name
- Eupithecia proflua L. B. Prout, 1932

Species of moth

Eupithecia proflua is a moth in the family Geometridae. It is found in Kenya, Tanzania and Uganda.

== Subspecies ==
- Eupithecia proflua proflua
- Eupithecia proflua subvincta Prout, 1932
