= Amata consimilis =

Scientific classification
- Kingdom: Animalia
- Phylum: Arthropoda
- Class: Insecta
- Order: Lepidoptera
- Superfamily: Noctuoidea
- Family: Erebidae
- Subfamily: Arctiinae
- Genus: Amata
- Species: A. consimilis

Binomial name
- Amata consimilis (Hampson, 1901)

Synonyms
- Syntomis consimilis Hampson, 1901

Species of moth

Amata consimilis is a moth of the subfamily Arctiinae that was described by George Hampson in 1901. It is found in Kenya and Tanzania.
