= Phyllonorycter ololua =

Scientific classification
- Domain: Eukaryota
- Kingdom: Animalia
- Phylum: Arthropoda
- Class: Insecta
- Order: Lepidoptera
- Family: Gracillariidae
- Genus: Phyllonorycter
- Species: P. ololua

Binomial name
- Phyllonorycter ololua de Prins, 2012

Species of moth

Phyllonorycter ololua is a moth of the family Gracillariidae. It is found in Kenya in dry highland forest at about 1,500 meters with stands of very high trees.

The length of the forewings is 3.23 mm.
