= Scopula recurvinota =

Scientific classification
- Domain: Eukaryota
- Kingdom: Animalia
- Phylum: Arthropoda
- Class: Insecta
- Order: Lepidoptera
- Family: Geometridae
- Genus: Scopula
- Species: S. recurvinota

Binomial name
- Scopula recurvinota (Warren, 1902)

Synonyms
- Ptychopoda recurvinota Warren, 1902

Species of geometer moth in subfamily Sterrhinae

Scopula recurvinota is a moth of the family Geometridae. It is found in Kenya.
