= Ethmia ballistis =

Scientific classification
- Kingdom: Animalia
- Phylum: Arthropoda
- Class: Insecta
- Order: Lepidoptera
- Family: Depressariidae
- Genus: Ethmia
- Species: E. ballistis

Binomial name
- Ethmia ballistis Meyrick, 1908

Species of moth

Ethmia ballistis is a moth in the family Depressariidae. It is found in Kenya and Tanzania.

The female of this species has a wingspan of 29–31 mm (1.1–1.2 in).
