= Phyllonorycter mida =

Scientific classification
- Domain: Eukaryota
- Kingdom: Animalia
- Phylum: Arthropoda
- Class: Insecta
- Order: Lepidoptera
- Family: Gracillariidae
- Genus: Phyllonorycter
- Species: P. mida

Binomial name
- Phyllonorycter mida de Prins, 2012

Species of moth

Phyllonorycter mida is a moth of the family Gracillariidae. It is found in eastern Kenya and Yemen. The habitat consists of coastal areas of the Indian Ocean.

The length of the forewings is 1.82–2.07 mm.
