= Scopula fragilis =

Scientific classification
- Domain: Eukaryota
- Kingdom: Animalia
- Phylum: Arthropoda
- Class: Insecta
- Order: Lepidoptera
- Family: Geometridae
- Genus: Scopula
- Species: S. fragilis

Binomial name
- Scopula fragilis (Warren, 1903)

Synonyms
- Lycauges fragilis Warren, 1903

Species of geometer moth in subfamily Sterrhinae

Scopula fragilis is a moth of the family Geometridae. It was described by Warren in 1903. It is endemic to Kenya.
