= Pyrausta diatoma =

Scientific classification
- Kingdom: Animalia
- Phylum: Arthropoda
- Class: Insecta
- Order: Lepidoptera
- Family: Crambidae
- Genus: Pyrausta
- Species: P. diatoma

Binomial name
- Pyrausta diatoma Hampson, 1913

Synonyms
- Pionea rubritinctalis Hampson, 1916; Ecpyrrhorrhoe diatoma (Hampson, 1913)

Species of moth

Pyrausta diatoma is a moth in the family Crambidae. It was described by George Hampson in 1913. It is found in Kenya and South Africa.
