= Chelecala =

Scientific classification
- Kingdom: Animalia
- Phylum: Arthropoda
- Class: Insecta
- Order: Lepidoptera
- Superfamily: Noctuoidea
- Family: Noctuidae (?)
- Subfamily: Catocalinae
- Genus: Chelecala; Hampson, 1913
- Species: C. trefoliata

Binomial name
- Chelecala trefoliata Butler, 1898

Genus of moths

Chelecala is a monotypic moth genus of the family Noctuidae erected by George Hampson in 1913. Its only species, Chelecala trefoliata, was first described by Arthur Gardiner Butler in 1898. It is found in Kenya.
