= Pterophorus denticulata =

Scientific classification
- Kingdom: Animalia
- Phylum: Arthropoda
- Class: Insecta
- Order: Lepidoptera
- Family: Pterophoridae
- Genus: Pterophorus
- Species: P. denticulata

Binomial name
- Pterophorus denticulata (Yano, 1963)

Synonyms
- Aciptilia denticulata Yano, 1963

Species of plume moth

Pterophorus denticulata is a moth of the family Pterophoridae. It known from New Guinea and Micronesia.

The length of the forewings is about 9 mm.

== Taxonomy ==
Some authors treat is as a synonym of Pterophorus niveus.
