= Pterophorus ischnodactyla =

Scientific classification
- Kingdom: Animalia
- Phylum: Arthropoda
- Class: Insecta
- Order: Lepidoptera
- Family: Pterophoridae
- Genus: Pterophorus
- Species: P. ischnodactyla

Binomial name
- Pterophorus ischnodactyla (Treitschke, 1833)

Synonyms
- Alucita ischnodactyla Treitschke, 1833; Aciptilia actinodactyla Chrétien, 1891; Aciptilia eburnella Amsel, 1968

Species of plume moth

Pterophorus ischnodactyla is a moth of the family Pterophoridae. It is known from South Africa, Bahrain, Oman, Yemen, Iraq, Israel, Lebanon, Syria, Turkey, Pakistan, Mongolia, Libya, Algeria, Ukraine and southern Europe.

The larvae feed on Convolvulus cantabrica.
