= Pterophorus massai =

Scientific classification
- Kingdom: Animalia
- Phylum: Arthropoda
- Class: Insecta
- Order: Lepidoptera
- Family: Pterophoridae
- Genus: Pterophorus
- Species: P. massai

Binomial name
- Pterophorus massai Gielis, 1991

Species of plume moth

Pterophorus massai is a moth of the family Pterophoridae. It is found in Kenya.

The wingspan is about 25 mm. Adults have been recorded in August.

== Etymology ==
The species is named after the type locality.
