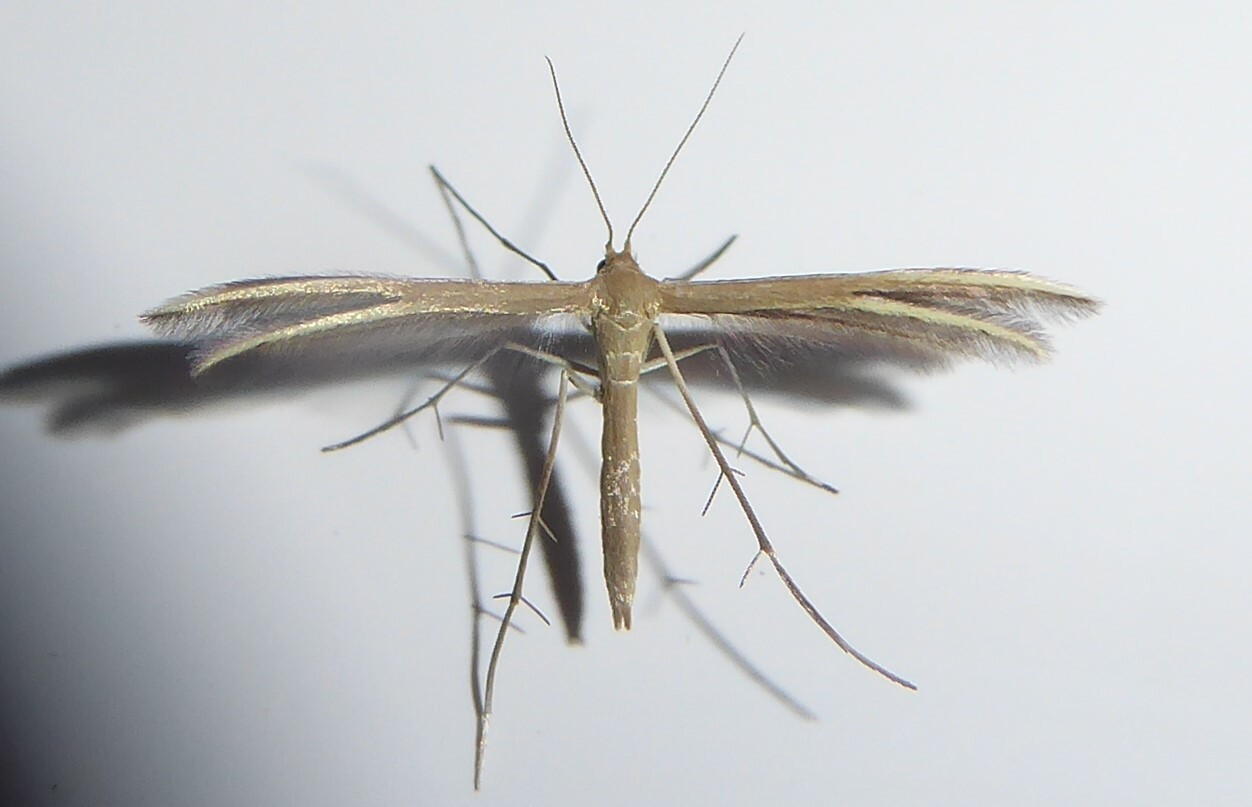

Scientific classification
- Kingdom: Animalia
- Phylum: Arthropoda
- Class: Insecta
- Order: Lepidoptera
- Family: Pterophoridae
- Genus: Pterophorus
- Species: P. innotatalis

Binomial name
- Pterophorus innotatalis Walker, 1864

Synonyms
- Aciptilia innotatalis (Walker, 1864); Alucita innotatalis (Walker, 1864)

= Pterophorus innotatalis =

Species of plume moth, endemic to New Zealand

Pterophorus innotatalis is a moth of the family Pterophoridae. It is endemic to New Zealand and has been found in the North, South and Ruapuke Islands. Adults of this species have been recorded as being on the wing from October to March as well as in August and prefers to inhabit grass or fern covered hills. The larvae are leaf miners and feed on Dichondra species, including Dichondra brevifolia and Dichondra repens.

== Taxonomy ==
This species was first described by Francis Walker in 1864 using a male specimen collected in Nelson by T. R. Oxley. In May 1885 Edward Meyrick placed this species within the Aciptilia genus. In 1913 Edward Meyrick placed Aciptilus furcatalis into the genus Alucita. In 1928 George Hudson discussed and illustrated this species, agreeing with the placement of this species in the Alucita genus. In 1988 J. S. Dugdale confirmed the placement of this species back into its original genus Pterophorus. In 1993 Cees Gielis discussed this species under the name Pterophorus innotatalis but placed it in a list where the species were regarded as having an uncertain status. The lectotype specimen is held at the Natural History Museum, London.

== Description ==
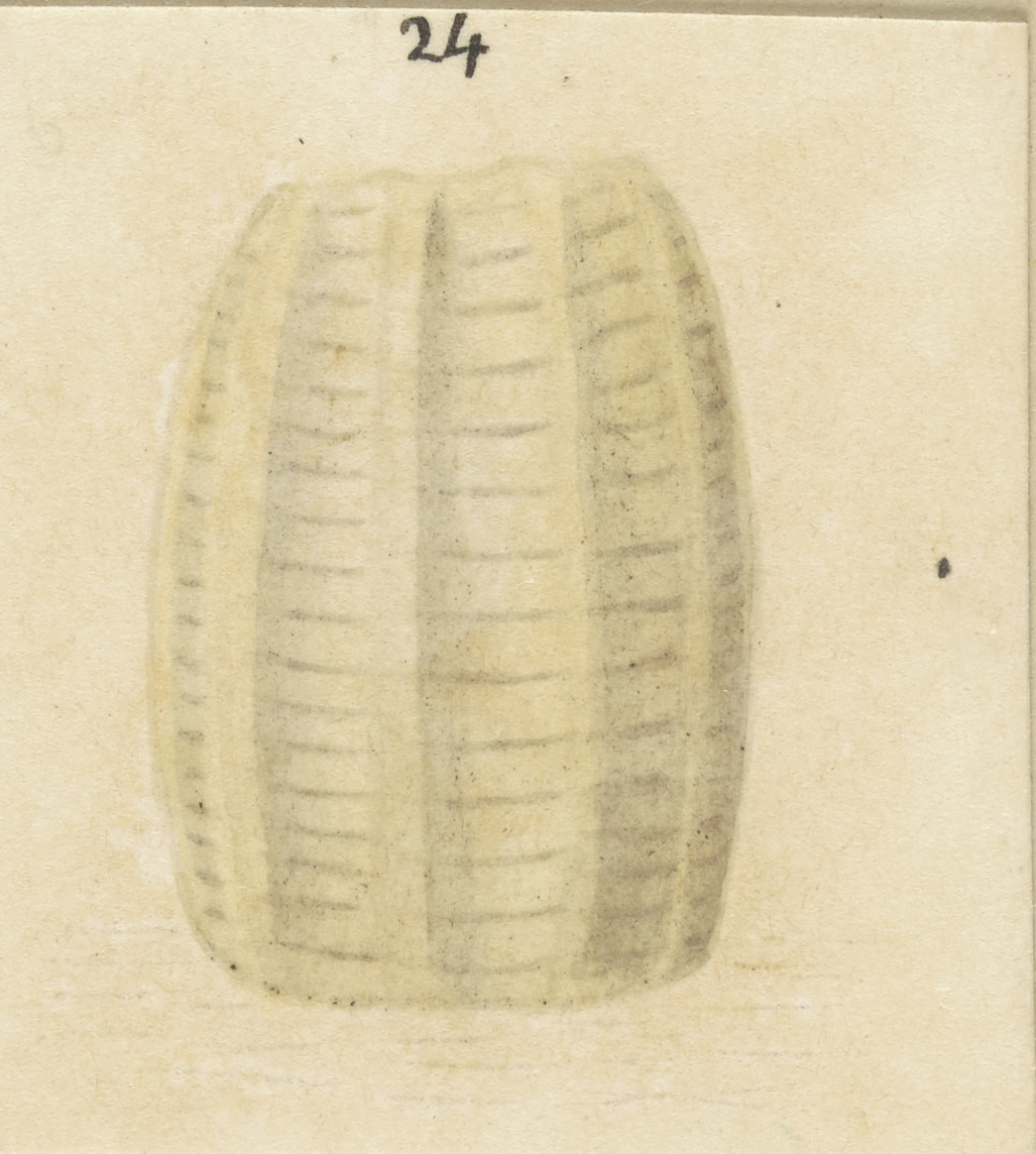
Illustration of egg of P. innotatlis.

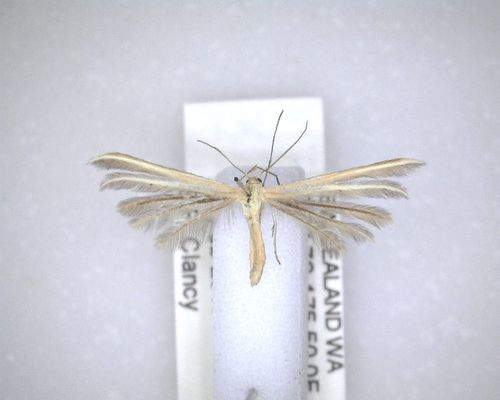
Specimen with P. innotatalis with spread wings.

The larvae of P. innotatlis are small and very hairy.

Walker described the adult of this species as follows:

Male. Pale ochraceous, slender. Legs silvery whitish, without any markings. Plumes of the wings extremely narrow. Fore wings unvaried, very acute. Hind wings cinereous-seneous, divided at the base into two plumes. Length of the body 4 lines; of the wings 10 lines.

Meyrick described the adult of this species as follows:

Male, female. — 15-16 mm. Head, palpi, antennae, thorax, and abdomen pale ochreous. Legs ochreous-whitish, anterior pair internally fuscous. Forewings pale whitish-yellowish, suffused with pale ochreous on anterior half : cilia dark fuscous, becoming yellow-whitish on costa before apex, on lower margin of second segment generally containing a black dot before middle and another beyond middle of segment. Hindwings dark grey; cilia fuscous-grey.

== Distribution ==
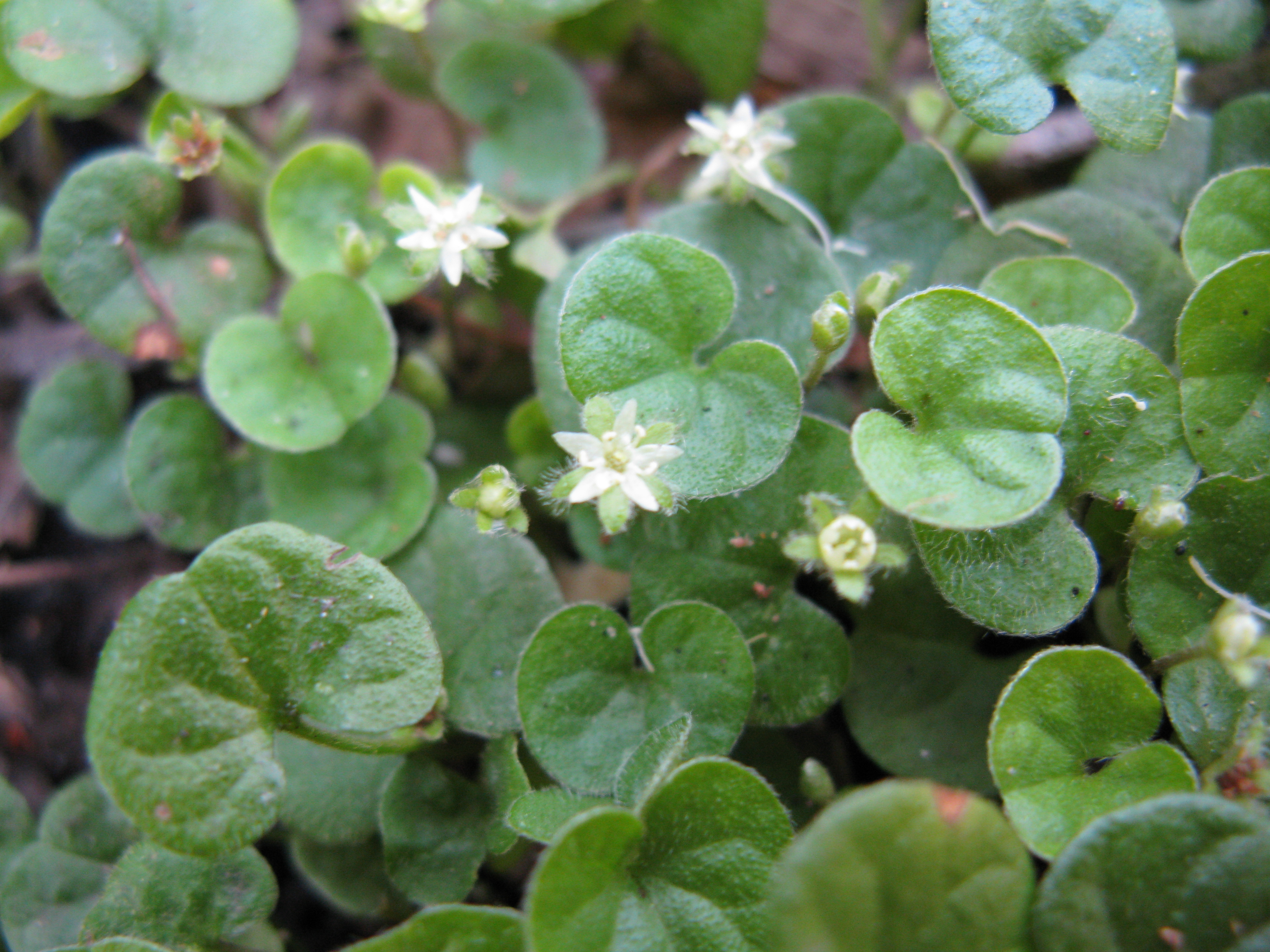
D. repens, host species of P. innotatlis.

This species is endemic to New Zealand. It has been recorded in the North and South Islands as well as at Ruapuke Island. It has been found at altitudes up to 1500 m.

== Behaviour ==
Adults of this species are on the wing from October to March but also in August, causing Hudson to hypothesise that it may have two or more broods a year.

== Habitat and host species ==
P. innotatalis inhabits grass or fern covered hills. The larvae are leaf miners and feed on Dichondra species, including Dichondra brevifolia and Dichondra repens. The last larval instar feeds on both sides of the leaf of their host species.
