= Pterophorus leucadactylus =

Scientific classification
- Kingdom: Animalia
- Phylum: Arthropoda
- Class: Insecta
- Order: Lepidoptera
- Family: Pterophoridae
- Genus: Pterophorus
- Species: P. leucadactylus

Binomial name
- Pterophorus leucadactylus (Walker, 1864)

Synonyms
- Aciptilus leucadactylus Walker, 1864; Pterophorus maolanensis Li, 2002

Species of plume moth

Pterophorus leucadactylus is a moth of the family Pterophoridae. It is known from Sri Lanka, Sumba, New Guinea, India, China, Taiwan, Malaya, Sumatra, Java, Borneo, the Philippines, Micronesia, the Bismarck Islands, the Solomon Islands, Australia and Vietnam.
