= Pterophorus lacteipennis =

Scientific classification
- Kingdom: Animalia
- Phylum: Arthropoda
- Class: Insecta
- Order: Lepidoptera
- Family: Pterophoridae
- Genus: Pterophorus
- Species: P. lacteipennis

Binomial name
- Pterophorus lacteipennis (Walker, 1864)

Synonyms
- Aciptilus lacteipennis Walker, 1864; Aciptilus similalis Walker, 1864; Aciptilia malacensis Zeller, 1877

Species of plume moth

Pterophorus lacteipennis is a moth of the family Pterophoridae described by Francis Walker in 1864. It is found in south and southeast Asia, including Taiwan, Burma, Borneo, the Solomon Islands, Australia and New Guinea.
