= Pterophorus lindneri =

Scientific classification
- Kingdom: Animalia
- Phylum: Arthropoda
- Class: Insecta
- Order: Lepidoptera
- Family: Pterophoridae
- Genus: Pterophorus
- Species: P. lindneri

Binomial name
- Pterophorus lindneri (Amsel, 1963)

Synonyms
- Aciptilia lindneri Amsel, 1963

Species of plume moth

Pterophorus lindneri is a moth of the family Pterophoridae. It is known from Ethiopia.

The species is shining white, without any dark scales.
