= Pterophorus kuningus =

Scientific classification
- Kingdom: Animalia
- Phylum: Arthropoda
- Class: Insecta
- Order: Lepidoptera
- Family: Pterophoridae
- Genus: Pterophorus
- Species: P. kuningus

Binomial name
- Pterophorus kuningus Arenberger, 1997

Species of plume moth

Pterophorus kuningus is a moth of the family Pterophoridae. It is found in south-east Asia.
