= Pterophorus elaeopus =

Scientific classification
- Kingdom: Animalia
- Phylum: Arthropoda
- Class: Insecta
- Order: Lepidoptera
- Family: Pterophoridae
- Genus: Pterophorus
- Species: P. elaeopus

Binomial name
- Pterophorus elaeopus (Meyrick, 1908)

Synonyms
- Alucita elaeopa Meyrick, 1908; Pterophorus elaeopa

Species of plume moth

Pterophorus elaeopus is a moth of the family Pterophoridae, native to Asia.

It is found in India, China Vietnam, Thailand, Laos, Malaysia and Indonesia.

The wingspan is 18–21 mm.
