= Pterophorus lieftincki =

Scientific classification
- Kingdom: Animalia
- Phylum: Arthropoda
- Class: Insecta
- Order: Lepidoptera
- Family: Pterophoridae
- Genus: Pterophorus
- Species: P. lieftincki

Binomial name
- Pterophorus lieftincki Gielis, 2000

Species of plume moth

Pterophorus lieftincki is a moth of the family Pterophoridae. It is found on western Java.
