= Pterophorus rhyparias =

Scientific classification
- Kingdom: Animalia
- Phylum: Arthropoda
- Class: Insecta
- Order: Lepidoptera
- Family: Pterophoridae
- Genus: Pterophorus
- Species: P. rhyparias

Binomial name
- Pterophorus rhyparias (Meyrick, 1908)

Synonyms
- Alucita rhyparias Meyrick, 1908; Alucita centrocrates Meyrick, 1933; Pterophorus viettei Bigot, 1964

Species of plume moth

Pterophorus rhyparias is a moth of the family Pterophoridae.

== Distribution ==
It is known from the Democratic Republic of Congo, Ethiopia, Kenya, Madagascar, Namibia, South Africa, Tanzania, Yemen, Uganda, Malawi and Zimbabwe.
