= Pterophorus bacteriopa =

Scientific classification
- Kingdom: Animalia
- Phylum: Arthropoda
- Class: Insecta
- Order: Lepidoptera
- Family: Pterophoridae
- Genus: Pterophorus
- Species: P. bacteriopa

Binomial name
- Pterophorus bacteriopa (Meyrick, 1922)

Synonyms
- Alucita bacteriopa Meyrick, 1922

Species of plume moth

Pterophorus bacteriopa is a moth of the family Pterophoridae. It is known from Tanzania.
