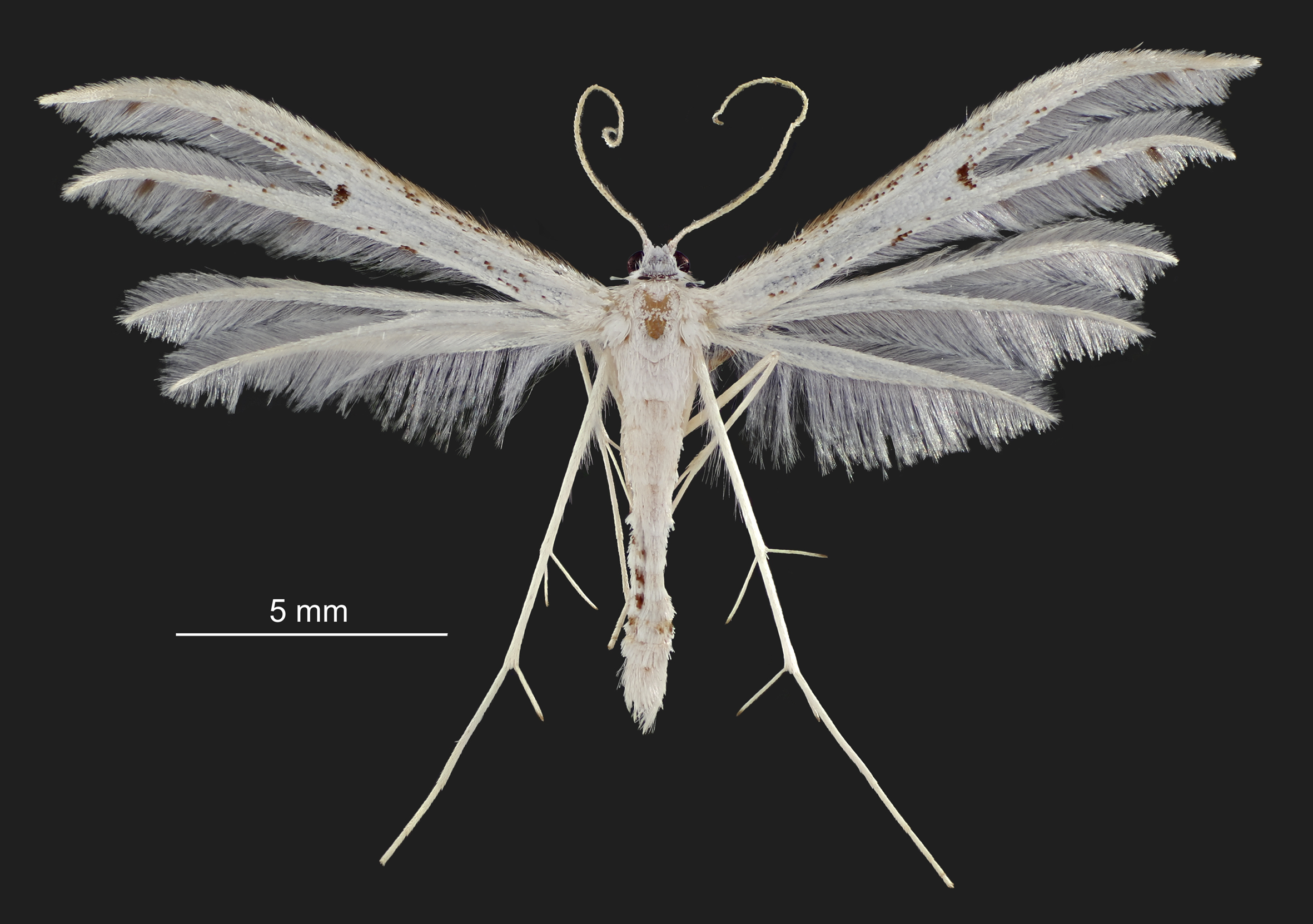
- Specimen from the New Zealand Arthropod Collection

Scientific classification
- Kingdom: Animalia
- Phylum: Arthropoda
- Class: Insecta
- Order: Lepidoptera
- Family: Pterophoridae
- Genus: Pterophorus
- Species: P. monospilalis

Binomial name
- Pterophorus monospilalis (Walker, 1864)

Synonyms
- Aciptilus monospilalis Walker, 1864; Aciptilus furcatalis var. β Walker, 1864; Aciptilus furcatalis var. γ Walker, 1864; Aciptila monospilalis Walker, 1864; Aciptilia patruelis Felder & Rogenhofer, 1875; Aciptilia lycosema Meyrick, 1885; Alucita monospilalis (Walker, 1864); Alucita lycosema (Meyrick, 1885)

= Pterophorus monospilalis =

Species of plume moth

Pterophorus monospilalis, the white plume moth, is a moth of the family Pterophoridae. It is endemic to New Zealand and occurs throughout the country. It inhabits native forest, parks and domestic gardens. Larvae are active during the day, are slow moving, and feed exposed. They feed on Araliaceae species as well as on Hedera helix, Meryta sinclairii, and Schefflera digitata. There are several broods in a year. Adult moths are on the wing from November until May and are attracted to light.

== Taxonomy ==
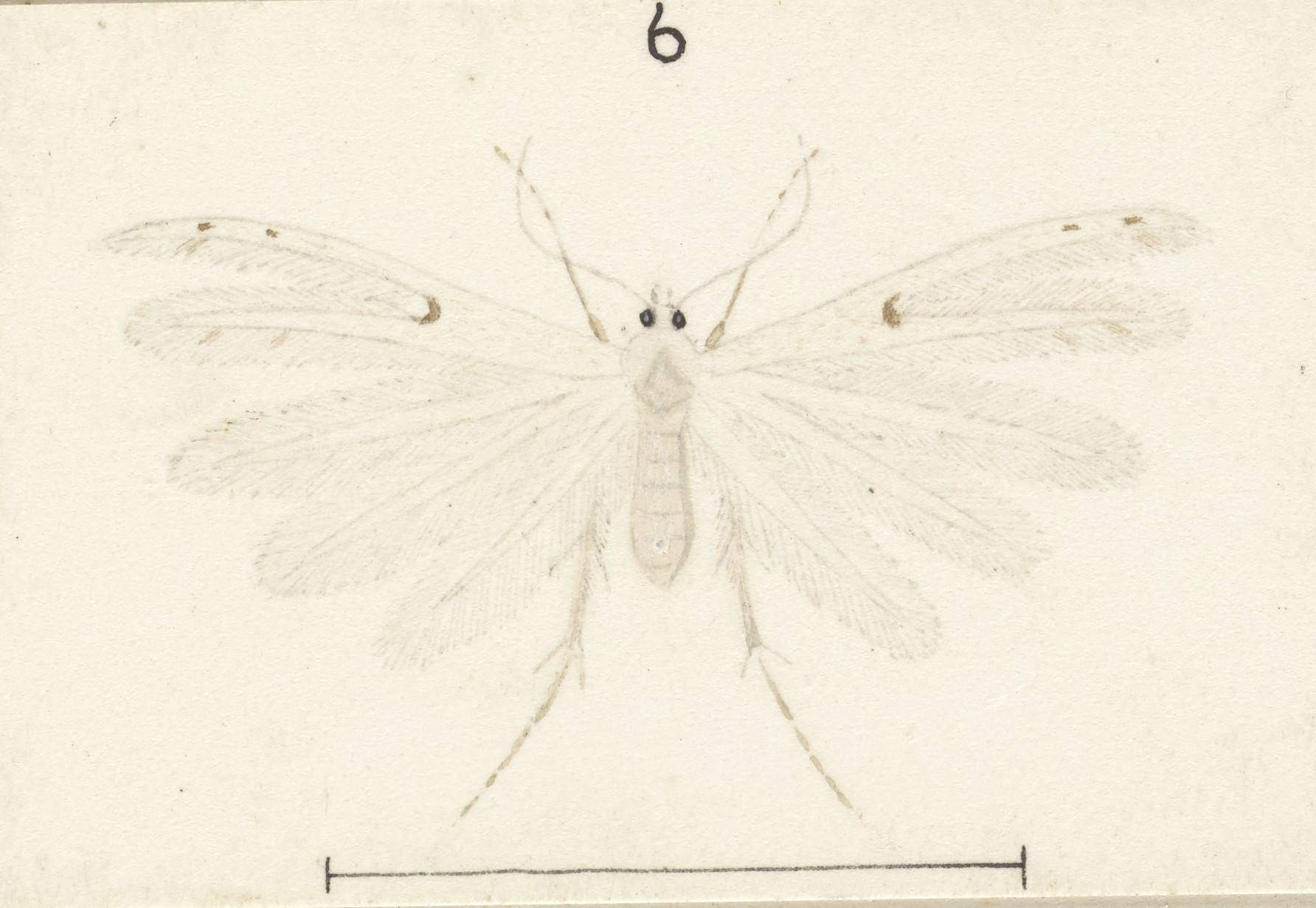
Illustration of female by George Hudson.

This species was first described by Francis Walker in 1864 and named Aciptilus monospilalis. In 1875 Cajetan von Felder and Alois Friedrich Rogenhofer, thinking they were describing a new species, named it Aciptilia patruelis. In 1885 Meyrick synonymised A. patruelis with A. monospilalis. In the same publication Meyrick, thinking he was describing a new species, also named this species as Aciptilia lycosema. Merick described both A. monospilalis and the newly named A. lycosema in greater detail in a later 1885 publication. In 1913 Meyrick placed both A. monospilalis and A. lycosema into the genus Alucita. This placement was followed by George Hudson in his 1928 book The butterflies and moths of New Zealand. In the same publication Hudson continued to treated A. lycosema as a separate species. In 1934 A. V. Chappell, while discussing the work Alfred Philpott had undertaken examining the genitalia of both A. monospilalis and A. lycosema, argued that the morphological similarities as well as the life histories of the two were sufficient to show that A. lycosema was a synonym of A. monospilalis. In 1988 John S. Dugdale synonymised the two varieties of the species Aciptilus furcatalis originally described by Walker in his 1864 publication into Pterophorus monospilalis. In 1993 Cees Gielis discussed this species under the name Pterophorus monospilalis but placed it in a list where the species were regarded as having an uncertain status. The male lectotype specimen, collected by D. Bolton in Auckland, is held at the Natural History Museum, London.

== Description ==
=== Egg ===
The egg of this species is elliptical shaped and coloured a very pale green with a faint honeycomb pattern on the flattened upper surface.

=== Larva ===
The mature larva was described by Chappell as follows:

13 mm. long; gradually tapering posteriorly; dorso-ventrally compressed, the ventral surface flat; 14 apparent segments; 16 legs; spiracles borne at ends of short protuberances. Head whitish with pale ochreous-brown markings on crown and sides, mouth-parts pale brown, ocelli brownish or reddish. Body semi-transparent, of a pale slightly yellowish delicate green through which the darker green alimentary canal is visible; the ventral surface much paler than the dorsal, being rather whitish. Variation in the intensity of green is but slight; some specimens slightly marked with black on anterior dorsal region, and flecked with pinkish or pale mauve. Setae numerous, arising from regular series of small verrucae; dorsal setae red-brown, the others white.

=== Pupa ===
The pupa is described by Chappell as being 10 mm long and coloured a very pale green with whitish shades on the wings and ventral portions. There is a noticeable black dorsal mark frequently present on lower thorax. The pupa often has pinkish-mauve marks. There are numerous setae with those on dorsal and lateral surfaces coloured a golden-brown, while those on ventral surface are white.

=== Adult ===
The wingspan of the adult moth is between 21–23 mm. The head, palpi, antennae, thorax, abdomen, and legs are white. The forewings are snow-white with a few brownish-ochreous scales, a blackish dot before the cleft and a minute one on the inner margin before the middle. The hindwings and cilia are snow-white.

This species has a form that has a brown streak on its forewing. This form can be confused with P. furcatalis but can be distinguished as the second plume is white where as with P. furcatalis that second plume is brown.

Life stages of Pterophorus monospilalis
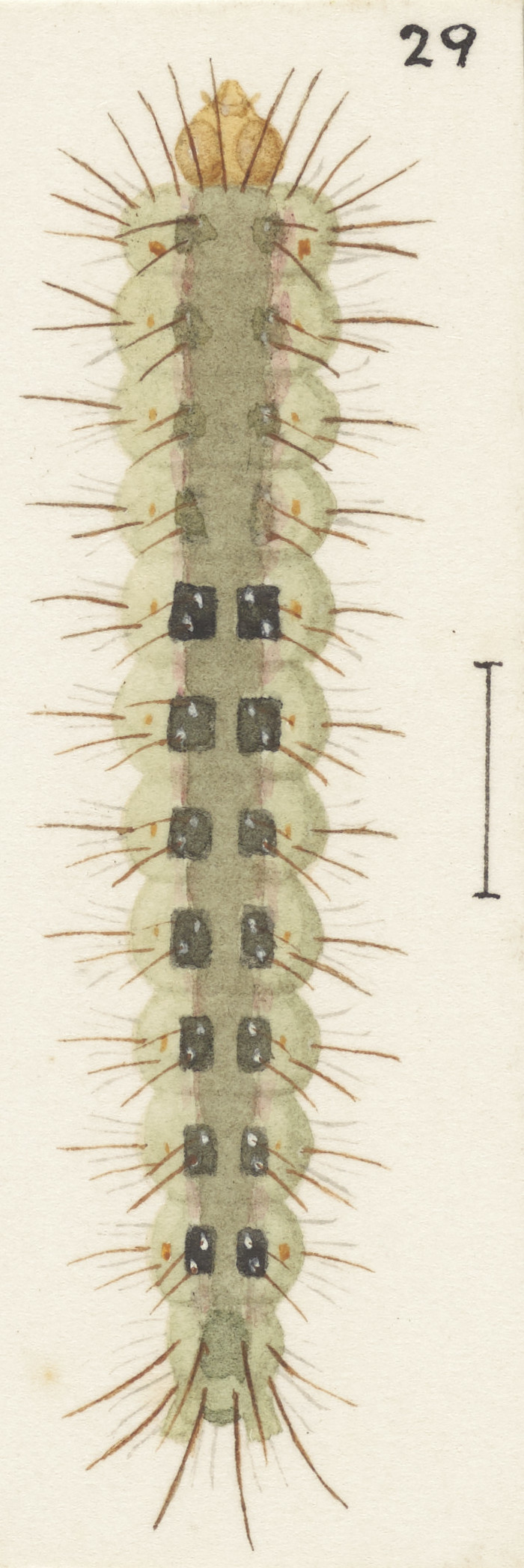
Larva

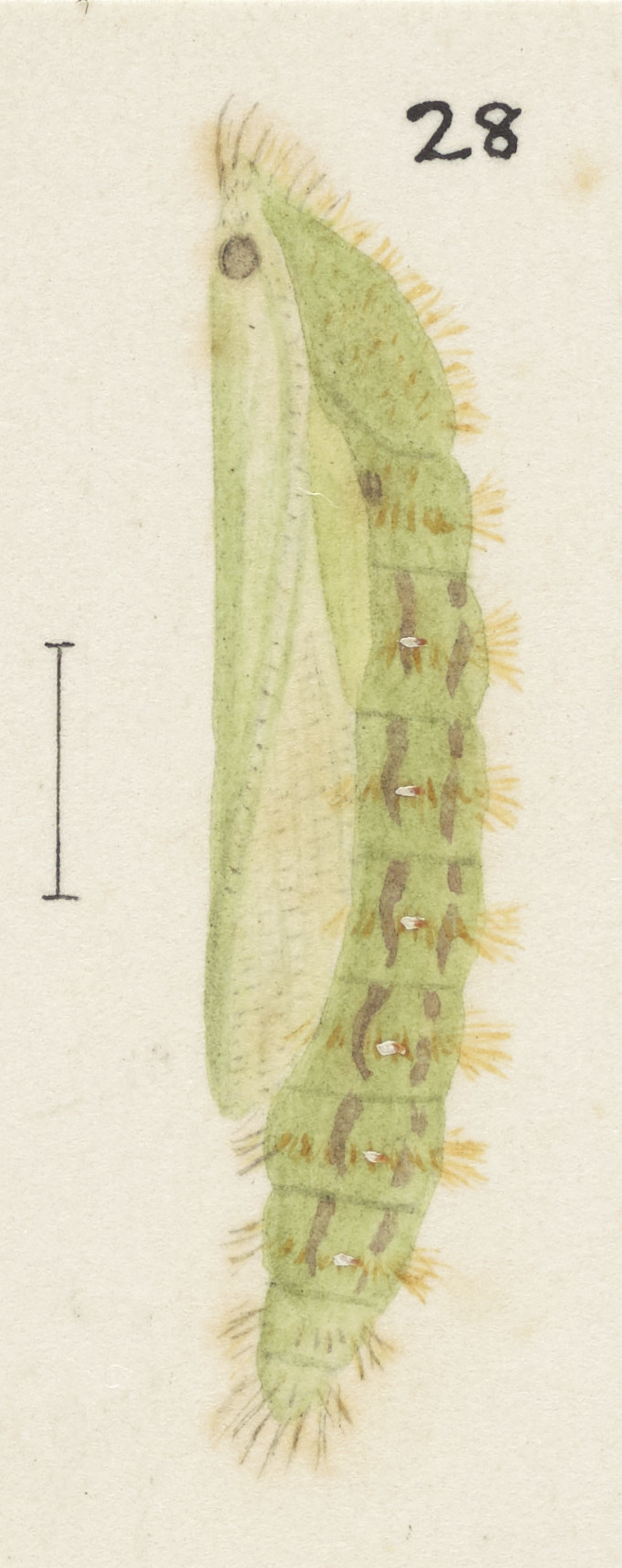
Pupa

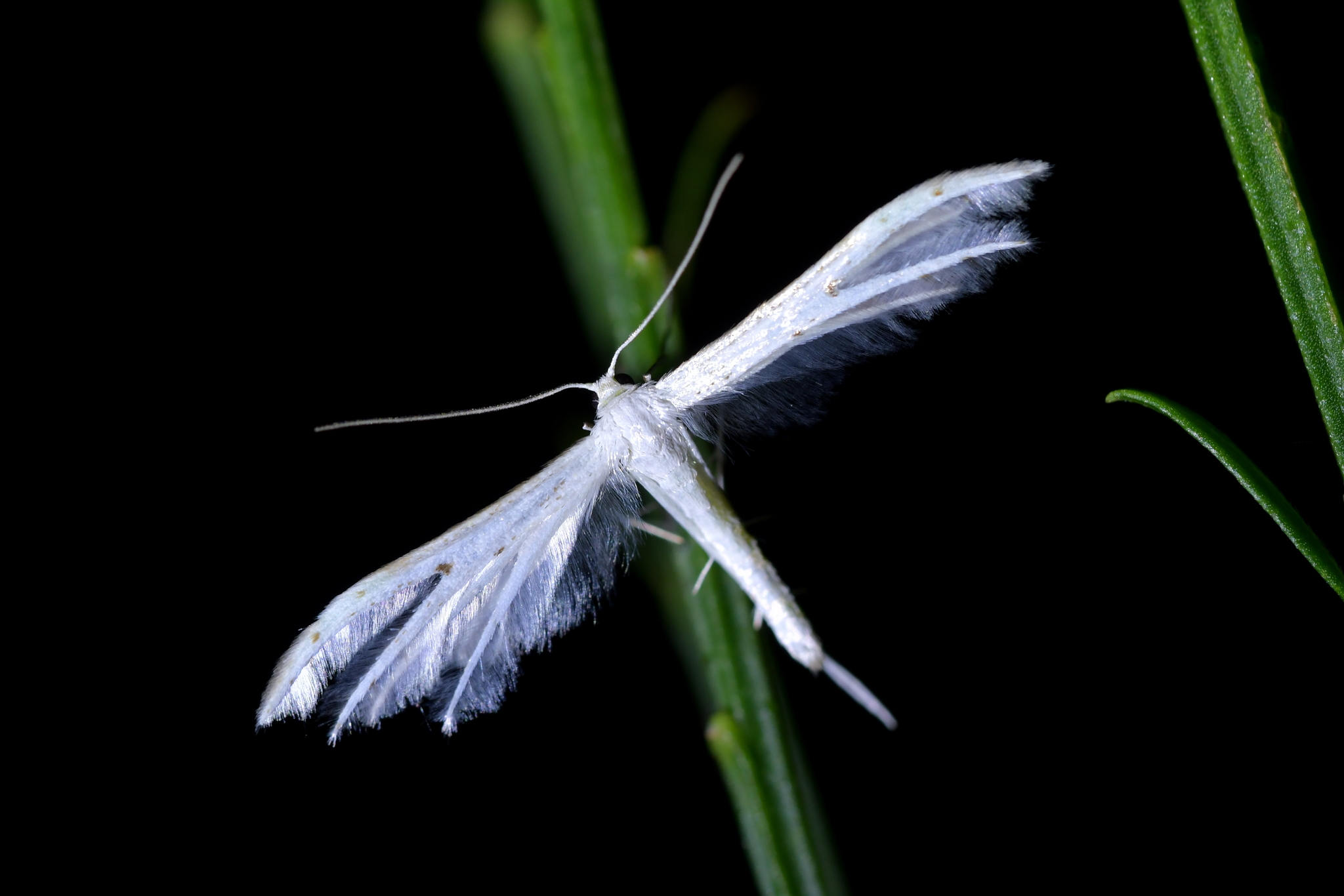
Adult

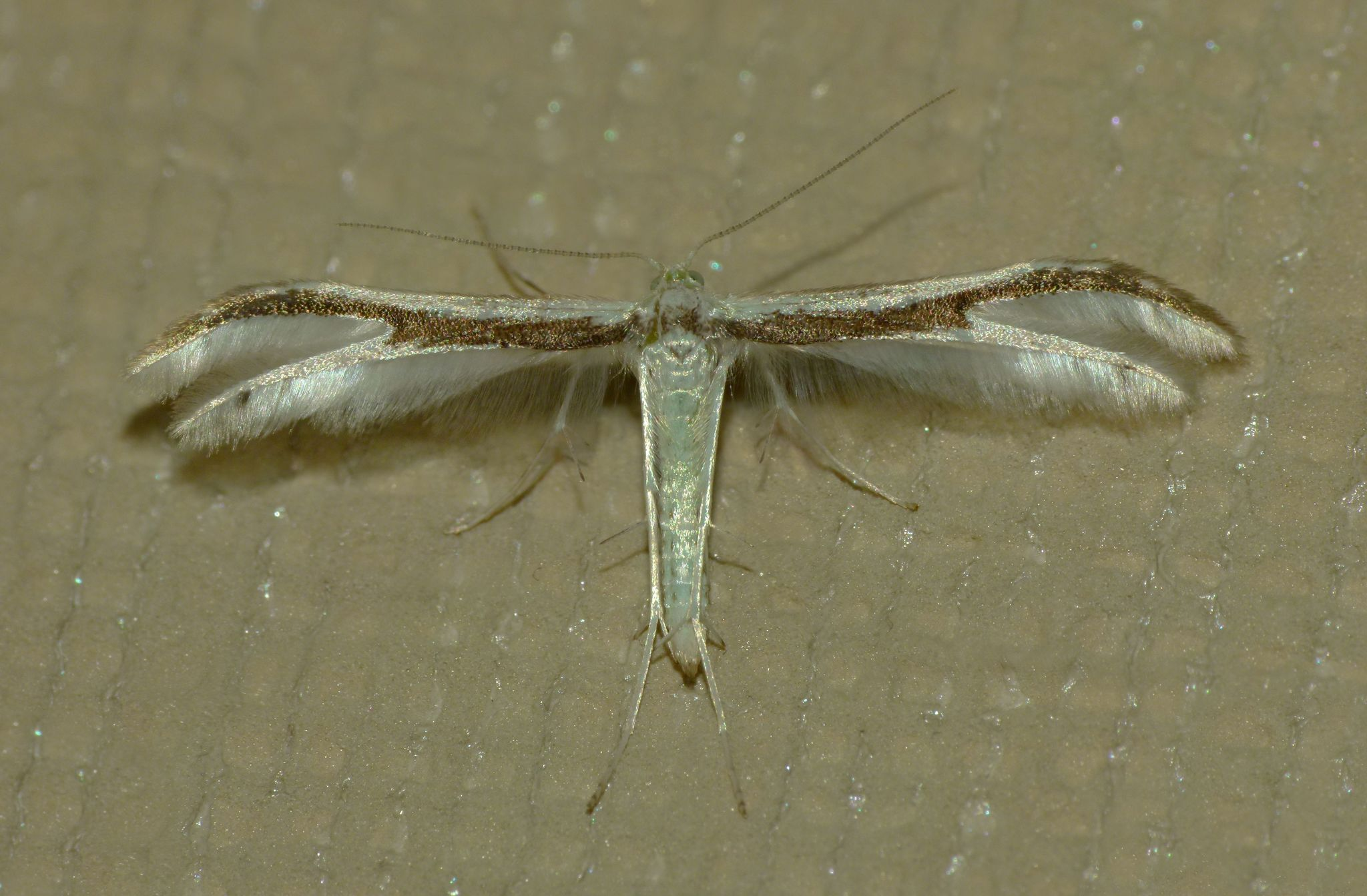
Adult, brown form

== Distribution ==
This species is endemic to New Zealand and can be found throughout the country. However it tends to be scarce in the northern parts of the North Island as well as in the southern parts of the South Island.

== Habitat and hosts ==
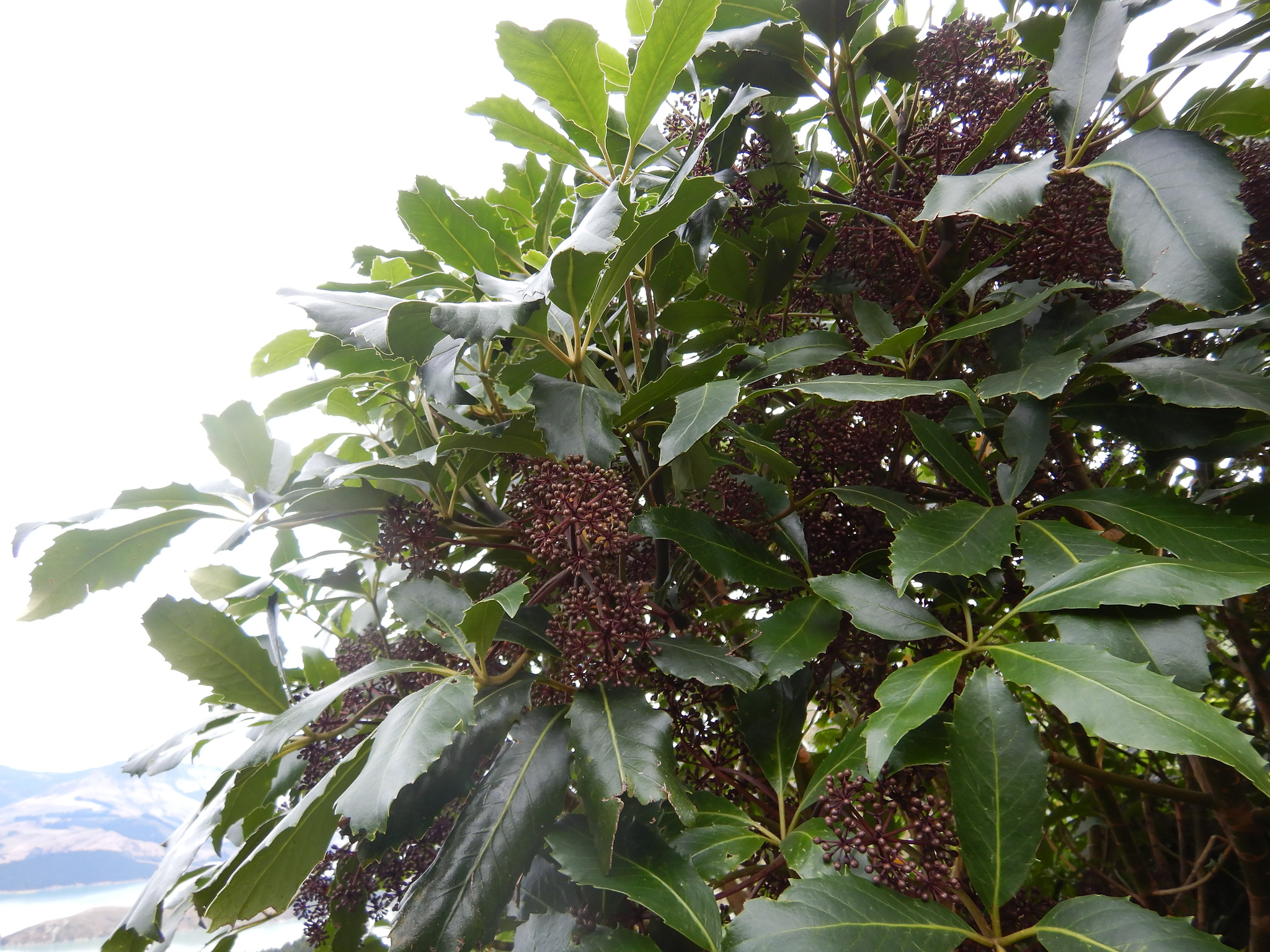
Larval host Pseudopanax arboreus.

The species inhabits native forest as well as domestic gardens and parks. The larvae feed on young new tips of Araliaceae species including Neopanax arboreus, Neopanax colensoi, and Pseudopanax lessonii as well as on Hedera helix, Meryta sinclairii, and Schefflera digitata.

== Life history and behaviour ==
The larvae of this species are diurnal, slow moving, and feed exposed without external protection. When they pupate the cocoon-less pupa is attached to the host plant leaf via a thread of silk. There are several broods in year. Adults are on the wing from November to May. It has been hypothesised that some adults from the autumn brood hibernate through winter. However it is more likely that the species exists in pupa through winter. They are nocturnal and are attracted to light.
