= Pterophorus virgo =

Scientific classification
- Kingdom: Animalia
- Phylum: Arthropoda
- Class: Insecta
- Order: Lepidoptera
- Family: Pterophoridae
- Genus: Pterophorus
- Species: P. virgo

Binomial name
- Pterophorus virgo (Strand, 1913)

Synonyms
- Alucita virgo Strand, 1913

Species of plume moth

Pterophorus virgo is a moth of the family Pterophoridae. It is known from Cameroon and Equatorial Guinea.
