= Pterophorus flavus =

Scientific classification
- Kingdom: Animalia
- Phylum: Arthropoda
- Class: Insecta
- Order: Lepidoptera
- Family: Pterophoridae
- Genus: Pterophorus
- Species: P. flavus

Binomial name
- Pterophorus flavus Arenberger, 1991

Species of plume moth

Pterophorus flavus is a moth of the family Pterophoridae. It is found in Nepal and northern India (Kumaon).

The wingspan is 17–25 mm. The forewings are yellow. Adults have been recorded in June, July and September.
