= Pterophorus cleronoma =

Scientific classification
- Kingdom: Animalia
- Phylum: Arthropoda
- Class: Insecta
- Order: Lepidoptera
- Family: Pterophoridae
- Genus: Pterophorus
- Species: P. cleronoma

Binomial name
- Pterophorus cleronoma (Meyrick, 1920)

Synonyms
- Alucita cleronoma Meyrick, 1920

Species of plume moth

Pterophorus cleronoma is a moth of the family Pterophoridae. It is known from Kenya.
