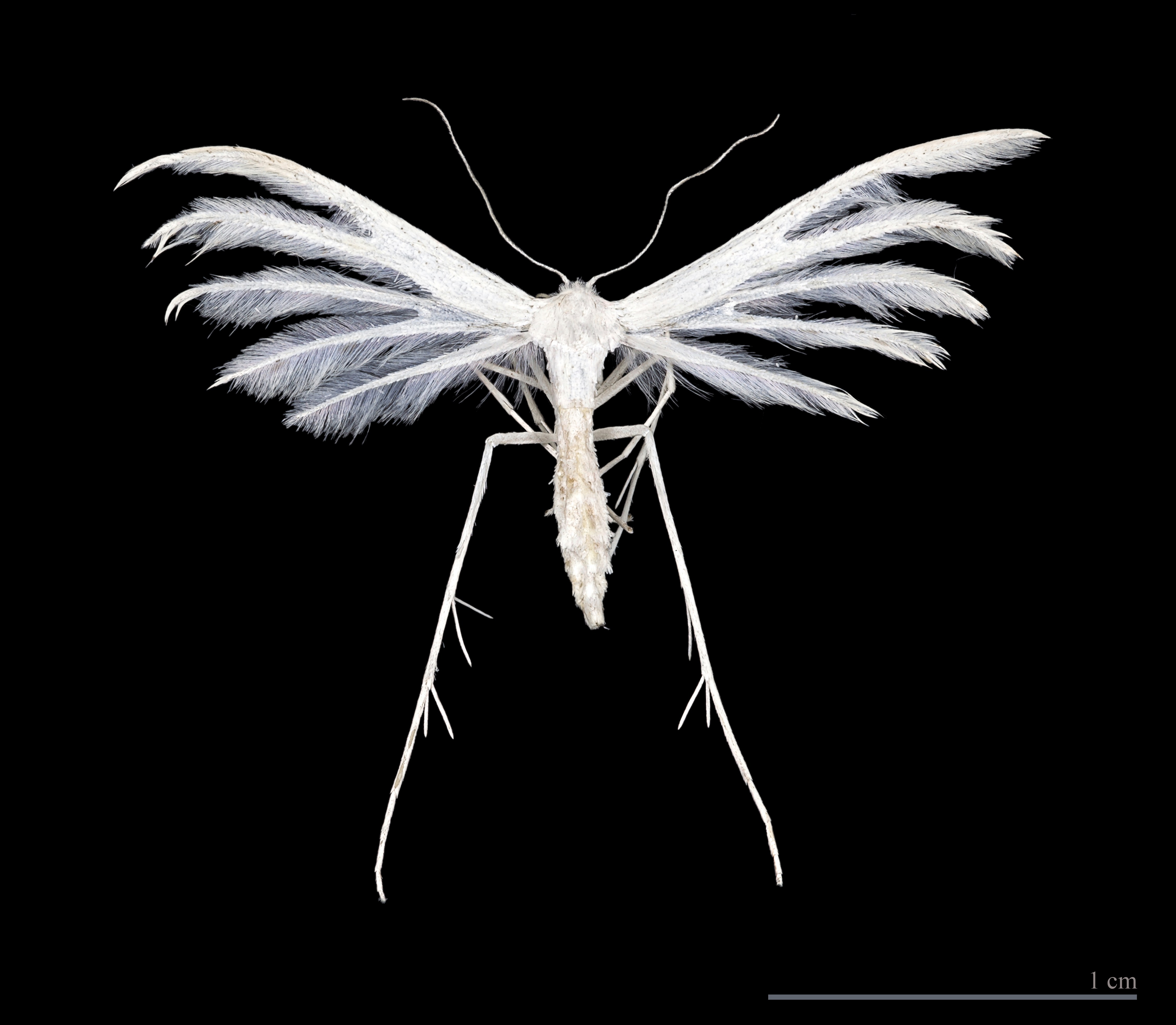
- Pterophorus pentadactyla

Scientific classification
- Kingdom: Animalia
- Phylum: Arthropoda
- Class: Insecta
- Order: Lepidoptera
- Family: Pterophoridae
- Tribe: Pterophorini
- Genus: Pterophorus; Schäffer, 1766

Synonyms
- Pterophorus Geoffroy, 1762 (suppressed); Plumiger Valmont-Bomare, 1791 (unavailable); Pterophora Hübner, 1806 (suppressed); Pterophora Hübner, 1822; Aciptilia Hübner, 1825; Aciptilus Zeller, 1841 (emendation); Ptorophorus Zeller, 1841 (incorrect spelling); Acoptilia Agassiz, 1847 (emendation); Acoptilus Agassiz, 1847 (emendation); Acyptilus de Graaf, 1859 (incorrect spelling); Alucita auct. nec Linnaeus, 1758

= Pterophorus =

Genus of moths

Pterophorus is a genus of moths in the family Pterophoridae.

== Species ==
The genus includes the following species:

- Pterophorus africanus Ustjuzhanin & Kovtunovich, 2010
- Pterophorus albidus (Zeller, 1852)
- Pterophorus aliubasignum Gielis, 2000
- Pterophorus ashanti Arenberger, 1995
- Pterophorus bacteriopa
- Pterophorus baliolus
- Pterophorus candidalis
- Pterophorus ceraunia
- Pterophorus chosokeialis
- Pterophorus cleronoma
- Pterophorus dallastai
- Pterophorus denticulata
- Pterophorus ebbei
- Pterophorus elaeopus
- Pterophorus erratus
- Pterophorus flavus
- Pterophorus furcatalis
- Pterophorus innotatalis
- Pterophorus ischnodactyla
- Pterophorus kuningus
- Pterophorus lacteipennis
- Pterophorus lamottei
- Pterophorus lampra
- Pterophorus legrandi
- Pterophorus leucadactylus
- Pterophorus lieftincki
- Pterophorus lindneri
- Pterophorus massai
- Pterophorus melanopoda
- Pterophorus monospilalis
- Pterophorus nigropunctatus
- Pterophorus niveodactyla
- Pterophorus niveus
- Pterophorus pentadactyla (Linnaeus, 1758)
- Pterophorus rhyparias
- Pterophorus spissa
- Pterophorus tinsuki
- Pterophorus uzungwe
- Pterophorus virgo
- Pterophorus volgensis (Moschler, 1862), 1862
- Pterophorus wahlbergi
