= Pterophorus lamottei =

Scientific classification
- Kingdom: Animalia
- Phylum: Arthropoda
- Clade: Pancrustacea
- Class: Insecta
- Order: Lepidoptera
- Family: Pterophoridae
- Genus: Pterophorus
- Species: P. lamottei

Binomial name
- Pterophorus lamottei Gibeaux, 1992

Species of plume moth

Pterophorus lamottei is a moth of the family Pterophoridae. It is known from Equatorial Guinea.
