= Pterophorus nigropunctatus =

Scientific classification
- Kingdom: Animalia
- Phylum: Arthropoda
- Class: Insecta
- Order: Lepidoptera
- Family: Pterophoridae
- Genus: Pterophorus
- Species: P. nigropunctatus

Binomial name
- Pterophorus nigropunctatus Arenberger, 1989

Species of plume moth

Pterophorus nigropunctatus is a moth of the family Pterophoridae. It is found in the Khasia Hills of Meghalaya, India.
