= Pterophorus melanopoda =

Scientific classification
- Kingdom: Animalia
- Phylum: Arthropoda
- Class: Insecta
- Order: Lepidoptera
- Family: Pterophoridae
- Genus: Pterophorus
- Species: P. melanopoda

Binomial name
- Pterophorus melanopoda (T.B. Fletcher, 1907)

Synonyms
- Alucita melanopoda T.B. Fletcher, 1907

Species of plume moth

Pterophorus melanopoda is a moth of the family Pterophoridae. It is found in India and Sri Lanka.

The wingspan is about 28 mm. The head, antennae, palpi, thorax and abdomen are pale glistening white. The forewings are pure glistening white, sprinkled with very minute black scales The hindwings are also pure glistening white, with a patch of faint fuscous on the costa of the first segment at three-quarters, and also on the inner margin of the second segment at three-quarters and at one-half. On the second segment, there is a moderate patch of black scales at one-half, and small black dots at three-quarters and at the apex.
