= Pterophorus chosokeialis =

Scientific classification
- Kingdom: Animalia
- Phylum: Arthropoda
- Class: Insecta
- Order: Lepidoptera
- Family: Pterophoridae
- Genus: Pterophorus
- Species: P. chosokeialis

Binomial name
- Pterophorus chosokeialis (Strand, 1922)

Synonyms
- Alucita chosokeialis Strand, 1922; Pterophorus chionadelpha (Meyrick, 1929); Alucita chionadelpha Meyrick, 1929; Pterophorus attenuatus Hao, Kendrick, Li, 2008

Species of plume moth

Pterophorus chosokeialis is a moth of the family Pterophoridae. It is found in Vietnam, Thailand, China (Hong Kong, Hainan, Fujian).
