= Pterophorus lampra =

Scientific classification
- Kingdom: Animalia
- Phylum: Arthropoda
- Clade: Pancrustacea
- Class: Insecta
- Order: Lepidoptera
- Family: Pterophoridae
- Genus: Pterophorus
- Species: P. lampra

Binomial name
- Pterophorus lampra (Bigot, 1969)

Synonyms
- Aciptilia lampra Bigot, 1969

Species of plume moth

Pterophorus lampra is a moth of the family Pterophoridae. It is known from the Democratic Republic of Congo, Cameroon, Gabon and Ivory Coast.

The forewings are purely white with some black scales near the base and inner margin of the first lobe.
