= Pterophorus ceraunia =

Scientific classification
- Kingdom: Animalia
- Phylum: Arthropoda
- Clade: Pancrustacea
- Class: Insecta
- Order: Lepidoptera
- Family: Pterophoridae
- Genus: Pterophorus
- Species: P. ceraunia

Binomial name
- Pterophorus ceraunia (Bigot, 1969)

Synonyms
- Aciptilia ceraunia Bigot, 1969

Species of plume moth

Pterophorus ceraunia is a moth of the family Pterophoridae. It is known from the Democratic Republic of Congo.

It is mostly white with distinct black fringe markings.

The larvae feed on Merremia hederacea and Oldenlandia corymbosa.
