= Pterophorus dallastai =

Scientific classification
- Kingdom: Animalia
- Phylum: Arthropoda
- Clade: Pancrustacea
- Class: Insecta
- Order: Lepidoptera
- Family: Pterophoridae
- Genus: Pterophorus
- Species: P. dallastai

Binomial name
- Pterophorus dallastai Gielis, 1991

Species of plume moth

Pterophorus dallastai is a moth of the family Pterophoridae. It is known from the Democratic Republic of Congo, South Africa and Malawi.

The wingspan is 24–28 mm. The species is characterized by the slightly ochreous tinge of the forewing. Adults have been recorded in March and April.

== Etymology ==
The species is named in honour of Dr. Ugo Dall'asta, curator of Lepidoptera at the Royal Museum for Central Africa.
