= Pterophorus ebbei =

Scientific classification
- Kingdom: Animalia
- Phylum: Arthropoda
- Class: Insecta
- Order: Lepidoptera
- Family: Pterophoridae
- Genus: Pterophorus
- Species: P. ebbei

Binomial name
- Pterophorus ebbei Arenberger, 1989

Species of plume moth

Pterophorus ebbei is a moth of the family Pterophoridae. It is known from New Guinea.
