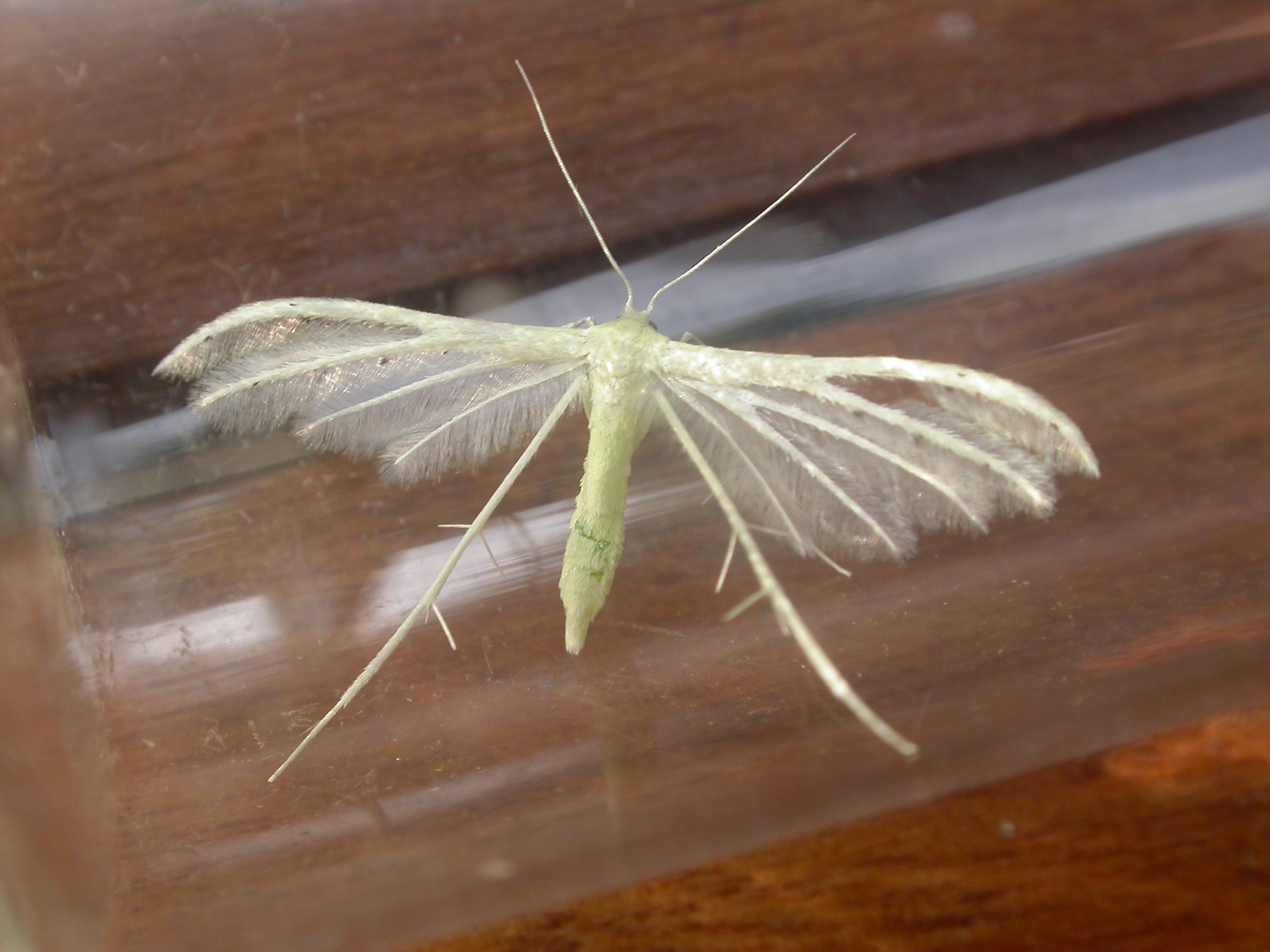

Scientific classification
- Kingdom: Animalia
- Phylum: Arthropoda
- Clade: Pancrustacea
- Class: Insecta
- Order: Lepidoptera
- Family: Pterophoridae
- Genus: Pterophorus
- Species: P. albidus

Binomial name
- Pterophorus albidus (Zeller, 1852)

Synonyms
- Aciptilia albidus Zeller, 1852; Alucita endogramma Meyrick, 1922; Aciptilia endogramma; Alucita endophaea Meyrick 1930; Pterophorus endophaea (Meyrick 1930); Pterophorus suffiata Yano 1963; Aciptilia suffiata

= Pterophorus albidus =

Species of plume moth

Pterophorus albidus is a moth of the family Pterophoridae. It is distributed in Africa, south and south-east Asia, including New Guinea and Australia, as well as Japan (Kyushu) and the Ryukyu Islands (Tokunoshima, Okinoerabujima, Okinawa).

The length of the forewings is 8–10 millimetres (0.31–0.39 in). The species is characterized by the faint yellow colour.

Larvae have been recorded feeding on Ipomoea nil.
