= Pterophorus aliubasignum =

Scientific classification
- Kingdom: Animalia
- Phylum: Arthropoda
- Class: Insecta
- Order: Lepidoptera
- Family: Pterophoridae
- Genus: Pterophorus
- Species: P. aliubasignum

Binomial name
- Pterophorus aliubasignum Gielis, 2000

Species of plume moth

Pterophorus aliubasignum is a moth of the family Pterophoridae. It is known from New Guinea.
