= Pterophorus africanus =

Scientific classification
- Kingdom: Animalia
- Phylum: Arthropoda
- Clade: Pancrustacea
- Class: Insecta
- Order: Lepidoptera
- Family: Pterophoridae
- Genus: Pterophorus
- Species: P. africanus

Binomial name
- Pterophorus africanus Ustjuzhanin et Kovtunovich, 2010

Species of plume moth

Pterophorus africanus is a moth of the family Pterophoridae. It is known from South Africa.
