= Pterophorus volgensis =

Scientific classification
- Kingdom: Animalia
- Phylum: Arthropoda
- Class: Insecta
- Order: Lepidoptera
- Family: Pterophoridae
- Genus: Pterophorus
- Species: P. volgensis

Binomial name
- Pterophorus volgensis (Moschler, 1862)

Synonyms
- Aciptilus volgensis Möschler, 1862; Oirata volgensis

Species of plume moth

Pterophorus volgensis is a moth of the family Pterophoridae. It is found in Russia (including the Ural Mountains).

The wingspan is 18–20 mm.

The larvae feed on Rindera tetraspis.
