= Pterophorus tinsuki =

Scientific classification
- Kingdom: Animalia
- Phylum: Arthropoda
- Clade: Pancrustacea
- Class: Insecta
- Order: Lepidoptera
- Family: Pterophoridae
- Genus: Pterophorus
- Species: P. tinsuki

Binomial name
- Pterophorus tinsuki Kovtunovich, 2003

Species of plume moth

Pterophorus tinsuki is a moth of the family Pterophoridae. It is found in India.
