= Pterophorus niveodactyla =

Scientific classification
- Kingdom: Animalia
- Phylum: Arthropoda
- Clade: Pancrustacea
- Class: Insecta
- Order: Lepidoptera
- Family: Pterophoridae
- Genus: Pterophorus
- Species: P. niveodactyla

Binomial name
- Pterophorus niveodactyla (Pagenstecher, 1900)

Synonyms
- Aciptilia niveodactyla Pagenstecher, 1900; Alucita niveodactyla

Species of plume moth

Pterophorus niveodactyla is a moth of the family Pterophoridae. It is found in Taiwan, China, India, Sri Lanka, Malaya, Java, Sumatra, the Philippines, Borneo, New Guinea, Micronesia, the Bismarck Islands, the Solomon Islands and São Tomé & Principe.

The length of the forewings is 8–9 mm. Adults have whitish wings without dark brown dots.

The larvae feed on the young leaves of Ipomoea species, eating the leaves from the outside and not entering within the unexpanded leaf. They are uniform pale yellowish-green and thickly studded with long tufts of whitish hairs. Pupation takes place in a green pupa, which is thickly covered with pale green hairs and with an interrupted dorsal and sub-dorsal row of black spots.
