= Pterophorus spissa =

Scientific classification
- Kingdom: Animalia
- Phylum: Arthropoda
- Clade: Pancrustacea
- Class: Insecta
- Order: Lepidoptera
- Family: Pterophoridae
- Genus: Pterophorus
- Species: P. spissa

Binomial name
- Pterophorus spissa (Bigot, 1969)

Synonyms
- Aciptilia spissa Bigot, 1969

Species of plume moth

Pterophorus spissa is a moth of the family Pterophoridae. It is known from the Republic of Congo, the Democratic Republic of Congo, Ghana and Nigeria.

The forewings are pure white, with small black spots at the inner margin of both lobes. The fringes display a distinct black-and-white pattern.
