= Pterophorus baliolus =

Scientific classification
- Kingdom: Animalia
- Phylum: Arthropoda
- Clade: Pancrustacea
- Class: Insecta
- Order: Lepidoptera
- Family: Pterophoridae
- Genus: Pterophorus
- Species: P. baliolus

Binomial name
- Pterophorus baliolus Bigot & Luquet, 1991

Species of plume moth

Pterophorus baliolus is a moth of the family Pterophoridae. It is known from Madagascar.
