= Pterophorus uzungwe =

Scientific classification
- Kingdom: Animalia
- Phylum: Arthropoda
- Class: Insecta
- Order: Lepidoptera
- Family: Pterophoridae
- Genus: Pterophorus
- Species: P. uzungwe

Binomial name
- Pterophorus uzungwe Gielis, 1991

Species of plume moth

Pterophorus uzungwe is a moth of the family Pterophoridae. It is known from Tanzania.

The wingspan is 18–19 mm. Adults have been recorded in August.

== Etymology ==
The species is named after the type locality.
