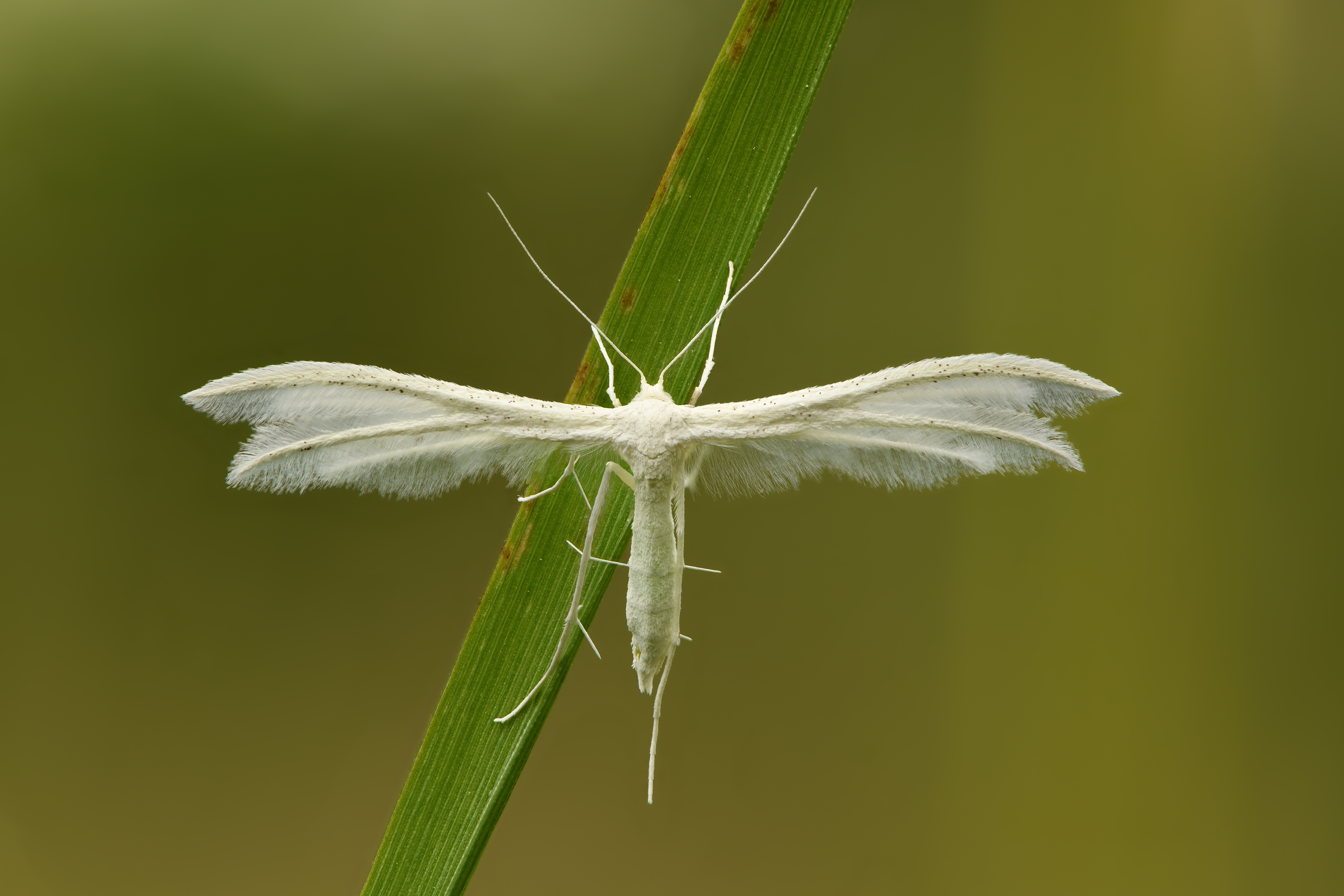

Scientific classification
- Kingdom: Animalia
- Phylum: Arthropoda
- Clade: Pancrustacea
- Class: Insecta
- Order: Lepidoptera
- Family: Pterophoridae
- Genus: Pterophorus
- Species: P. pentadactyla

Binomial name
- Pterophorus pentadactyla (Linnaeus, 1758)

Synonyms
- List: Aciptilia pentadactyla (Linnaeus, 1758); Phalaena tridactyla Scopoli, 1763; Alucita pentadactyla Denis & Schiffermüller, 1775; Alucita pentadactyla Hübner, [1805]; Aciptilia pentadactyla var. sulphurea Staudinger, 1880; Pterophorus pentadactylus (lapsus)

= Pterophorus pentadactyla =

Species of moth

Pterophorus pentadactyla, commonly known as the white plume moth, is a moth in the family Pterophoridae. It is found in the West Palearctic including North Africa and Europe. The wingspan is 26–34 mm (1.0–1.3 in). It is uniformly white, with the hind wing pair divided in three feathery plumes and the front pair in another two. The moths fly from June to August. The larvae feed on bindweed (Convolvulus species).

== Taxonomy ==
This moth was first described by Carl Linnaeus in 1758 in the 10th edition of Systema Naturae. He gave it the name Aciptilia pentadactyla, with the specific epithet being descriptive of the appearance of the wings, and coming from the Greek meaning "five fingers"; the insect was later transferred to the genus Pterophorus.

== Description ==
The white plume moth is a distinctive insect with a wingspan of 26 to 34 mm (1.0 to 1.3 in). The adult is pure white, the wings being divided into five slender feather-like plumes, two forming part of the forewing and three part of the hind wing. The insect is nocturnal, emerging at dusk, and is on the wing during June and July. The larvae are green, with a yellow dorsal stripe and tufts of pale hairs. The plume moth has a very unique resting position, during the day it sits on plants while in a T shape. It achieves this look by holding its unique split wings close to its body at right angles then, tightly rolling them into narrow rod cylinders.

== Distribution and habitat ==
This moth is found over much of Europe and the Middle East, as far east as Iran, also North Africa. In Britain, it is common in England and Wales but more local in southern Scotland and in the coastal parts of western, southern and eastern Ireland. It is typically found in rough grassland, on road verges and in gardens. The larva feeds on leaves and flowers of field bindweed, hedge bindweed and other members of the family Convolvulaceae. It hibernates, overwintering as a small larva. Recent sightings have been reported in The Democratic Republic of Congo which confirm that this moth is also present in Central Africa.

== Pest status ==
The sweet potato (Ipomoea batatas) is a member of the family Convolvulaceae, and in Nigeria, the larvae of the white plume moth feed on the plant. The moth is considered a pest species along with the sweet potato butterfly (Acraea acerata), leaf folders (Brachmia and Helcystogramma spp.), and sweet potato army worms (Spodoptera spp.).

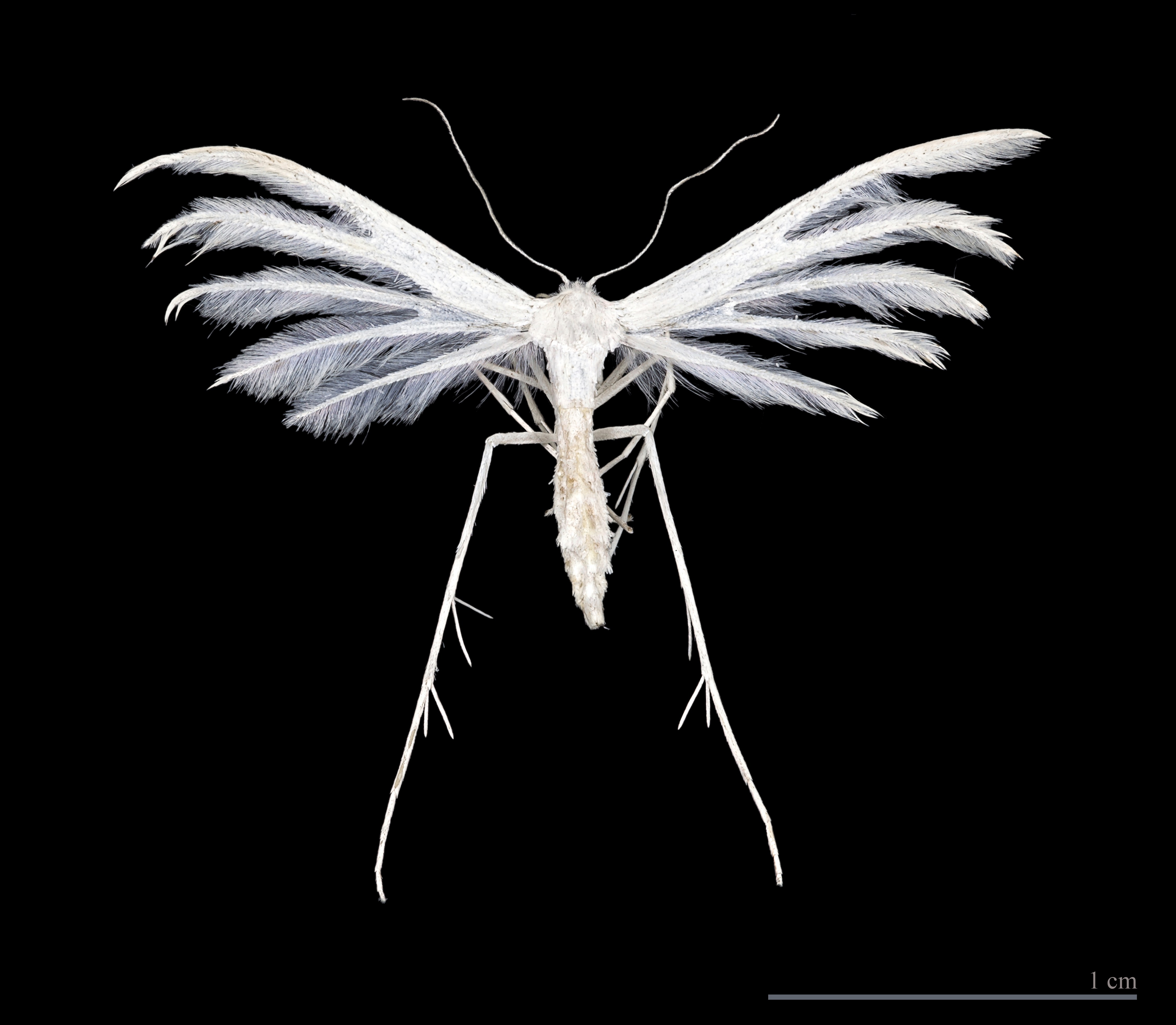
Adult male specimen

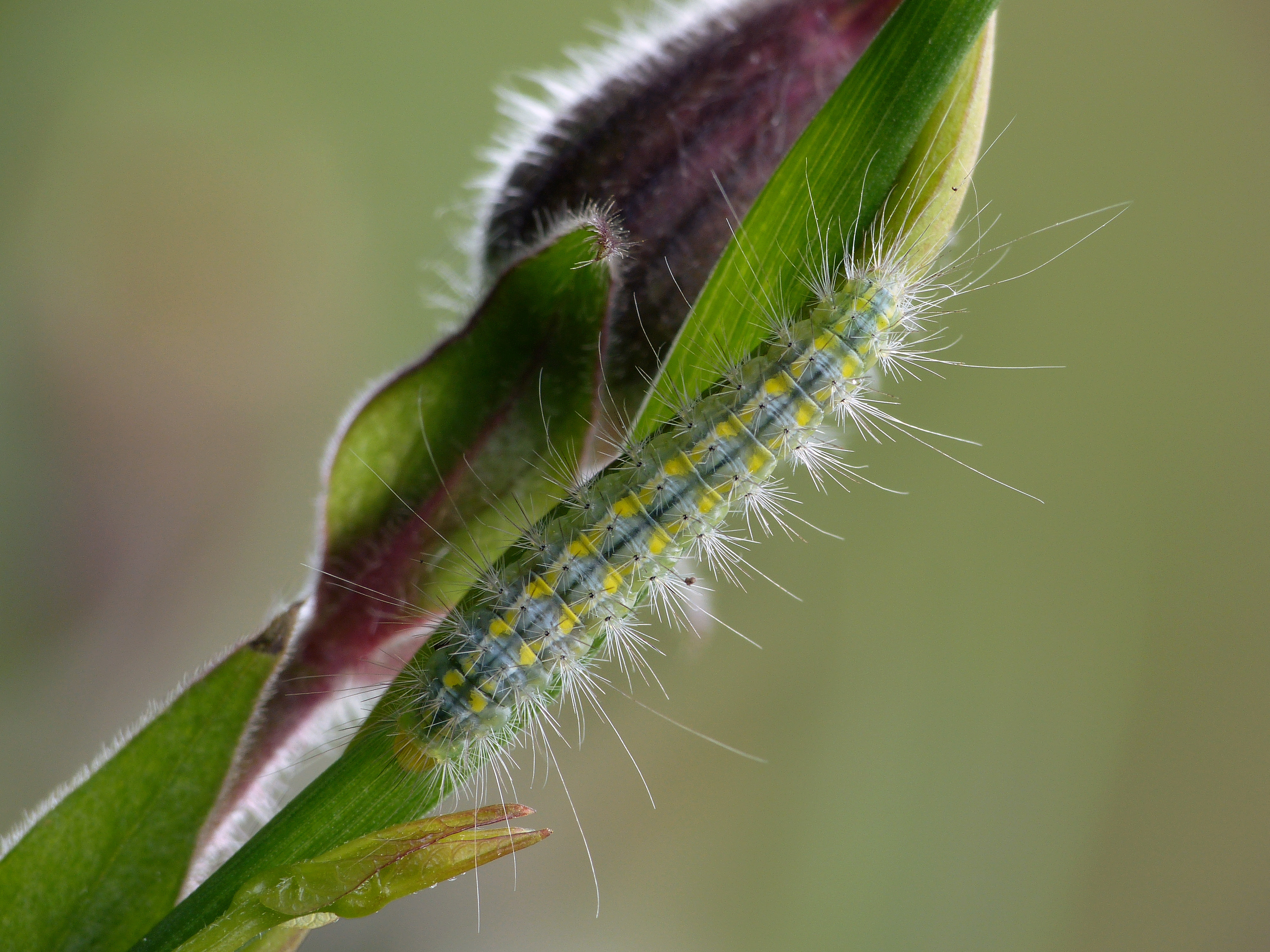
Larva
