= Pterophorus erratus =

Scientific classification
- Kingdom: Animalia
- Phylum: Arthropoda
- Class: Insecta
- Order: Lepidoptera
- Family: Pterophoridae
- Genus: Pterophorus
- Species: P. erratus

Binomial name
- Pterophorus erratus Gielis, 2000

Species of plume moth

Pterophorus erratus is a moth of the family Pterophoridae. It is found in Sabah on the island Borneo.
