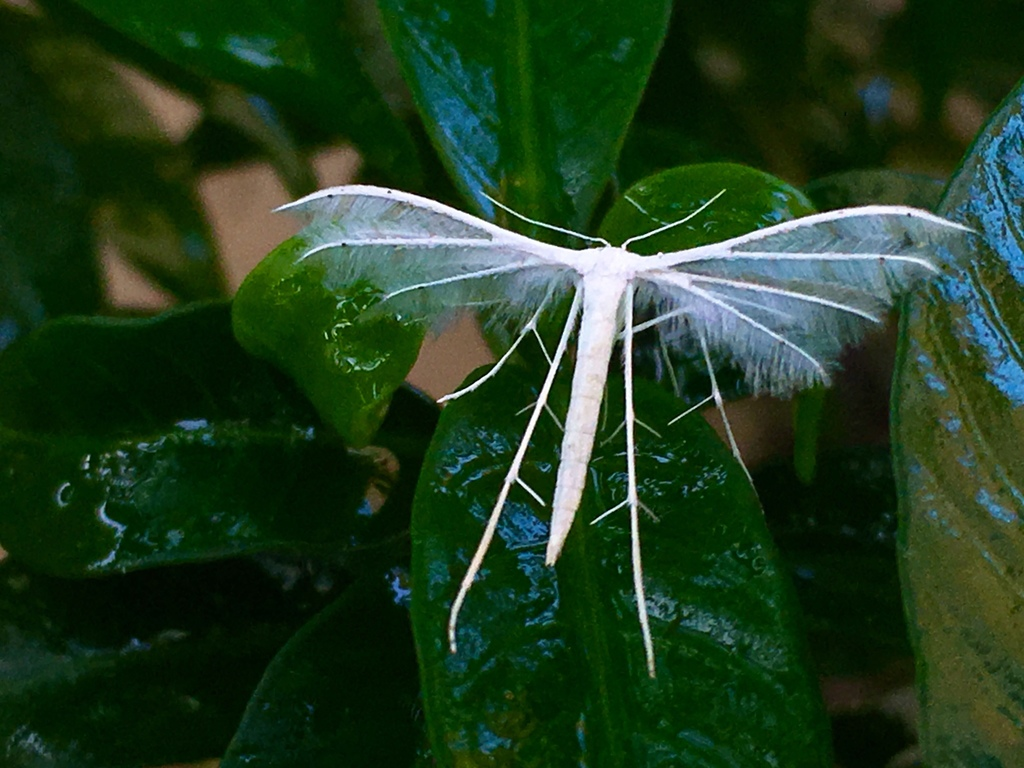

Scientific classification
- Kingdom: Animalia
- Phylum: Arthropoda
- Class: Insecta
- Order: Lepidoptera
- Family: Pterophoridae
- Genus: Pterophorus
- Species: P. niveus

Binomial name
- Pterophorus niveus (Snellen, 1903)

Synonyms
- Aciptilia niveus Snellen, 1903

= Pterophorus niveus =

Species of plume moth

Pterophorus niveus is a moth of the family Pterophoridae. It is found from Indonesia to the Solomon Islands and north to Luzon.
