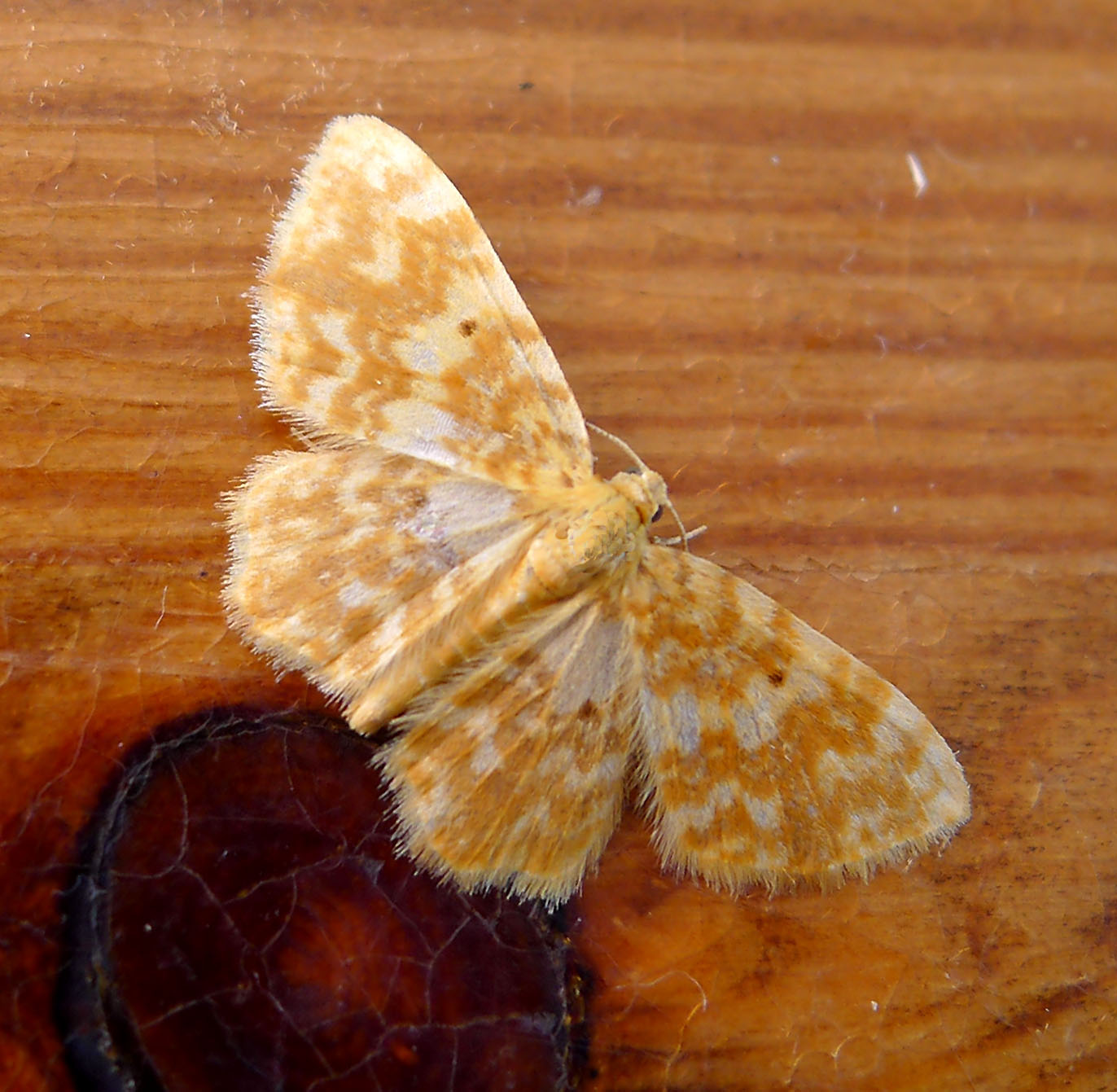
- Hydrelia flammeolaria

Scientific classification
- Kingdom: Animalia
- Phylum: Arthropoda
- Clade: Pancrustacea
- Class: Insecta
- Order: Lepidoptera
- Family: Geometridae
- Tribe: Asthenini
- Genus: Hydrelia; Hübner, 1825

Synonyms
- Autallacta Warren, 1893

= Hydrelia =

Genus of moths

Hydrelia is a genus of moths in the family Geometridae first described by Jacob Hübner in 1825.

== Species ==
- Hydrelia aggerata Prout, 1938
- Hydrelia albifera (Walker, 1866) - fragile white carpet moth
- Hydrelia arizana (Wileman, 1911)
- Hydrelia aurantiaca Hampson, 1903
- Hydrelia bella (Wileman, 1916)
- Hydrelia bicauliata Prout, 1914
- Hydrelia bicolorata (Moore, 1868)
- Hydrelia binotata Inoue, 1987
- Hydrelia brunneifasciata (Packard, 1876)
- Hydrelia castaria (Leech, 1897)
- Hydrelia chionata (Lederer, 1870)
- Hydrelia cingulata Hampson, 1896
- Hydrelia condensata (Walker, 1862)
- Hydrelia conspicuaria (Leech, 1897)
- Hydrelia controversa Inoue, 1982
- Hydrelia crocearia Hampson, 1896
- Hydrelia elegans (Inoue, 1982)
- Hydrelia enisaria Prout, 1926
- Hydrelia flammeolaria (Hufnagel, 1767) - small yellow wave
- Hydrelia flammulata (Bastelberger, 1911)
- Hydrelia flavidula (Warren, 1907)
- Hydrelia flavilinea (Warren, 1893)
- Hydrelia fuscocastanea Inoue, 1982
- Hydrelia gracilipennis Inoue, 1982
- Hydrelia impleta Prout, 1938
- Hydrelia inornata (Hulst, 1896)
- Hydrelia laetivirga Prout, 1934
- Hydrelia latsaria (Oberthur, 1893)
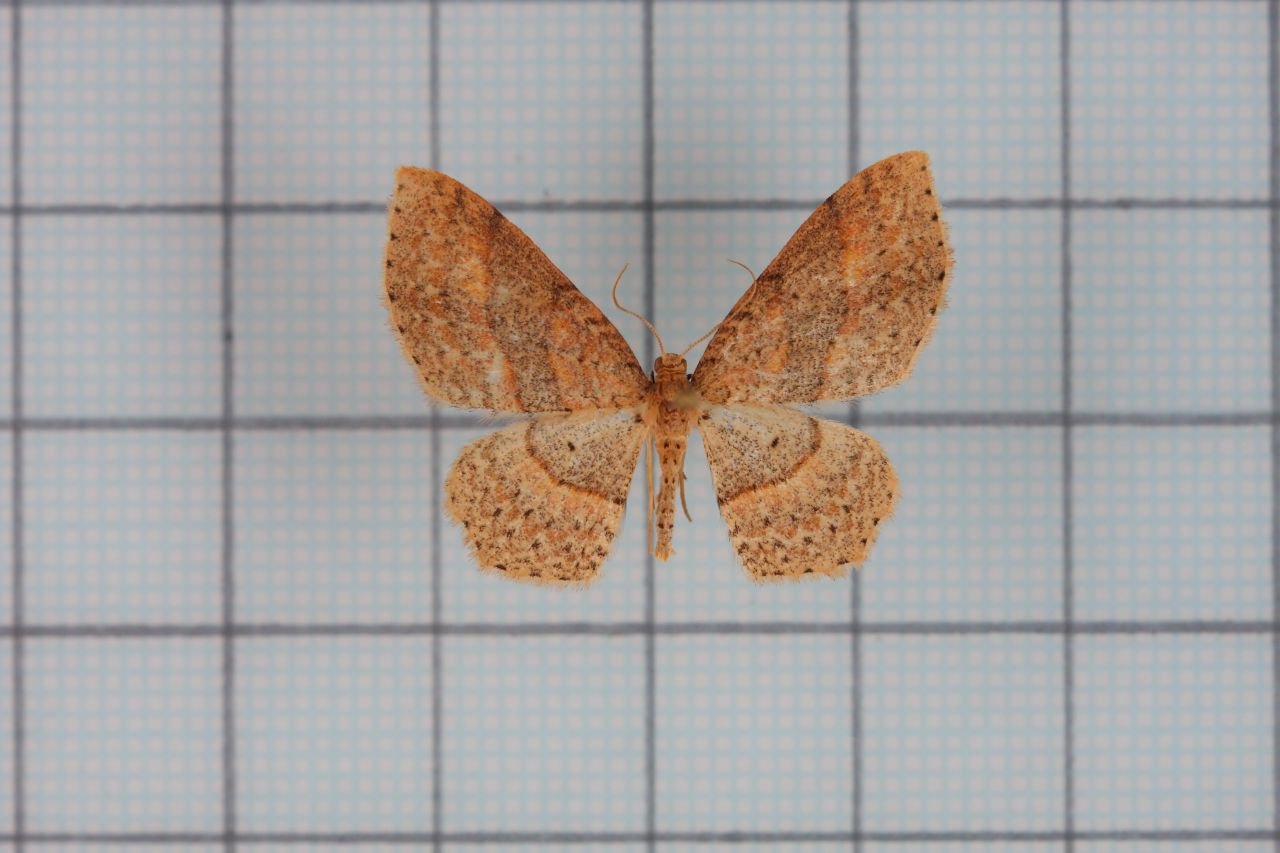
  Hydrelia arizana
- Hydrelia leucogramma Wehrli, 1931
- Hydrelia lineata (Warren, 1893)
- Hydrelia lucata (Guenee, 1857)
- Hydrelia luteosparsata Sterneck, 1928
- Hydrelia marginepunctata Warren, 1893
- Hydrelia microptera Inoue, 1987
- Hydrelia musculata (Staudinger, 1897)
- Hydrelia nepalensis Inoue, 1987
- Hydrelia nisaria (Christoph, 1881)
- Hydrelia ochrearia Leech, 1897
- Hydrelia ornata (Moore, 1868)
- Hydrelia parvularia (Leech, 1897)
- Hydrelia parvulata (Staudinger, 1897)
- Hydrelia pavonica Xue, 1999
- Hydrelia percandidata (Christoph, 1893)
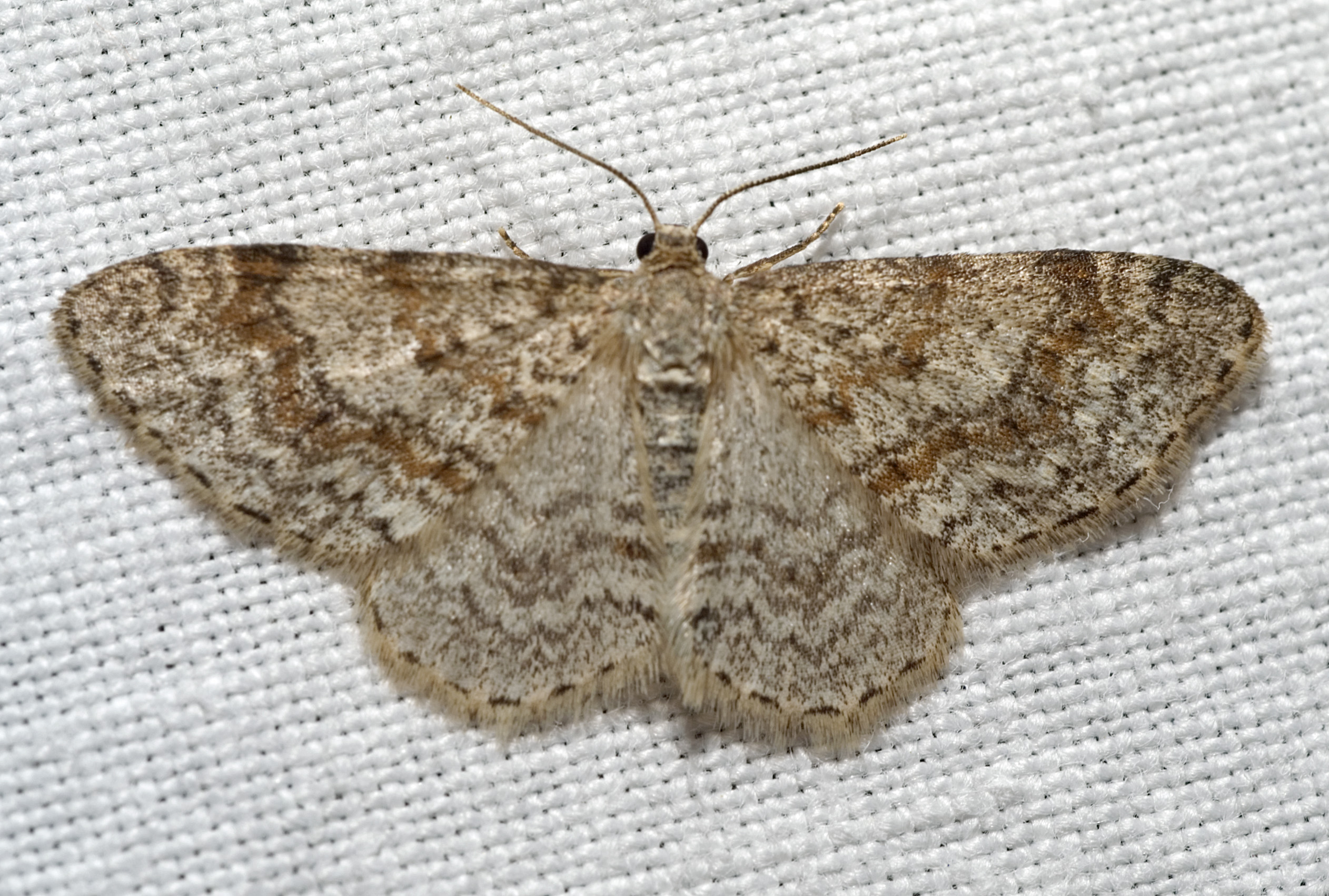
  Hydrelia sylvata
- Hydrelia rhodoptera Hampson, 1895
- Hydrelia rubraria Hampson, 1903
- Hydrelia rubricosta Inoue, 1982
- Hydrelia rubrilinea Inoue, 1987
- Hydrelia rubrivena Wileman, 1911
- Hydrelia rufigrisea (Warren, 1893)
- Hydrelia rufinota Hampson, 1896
- Hydrelia sanguiflua Hampson, 1896
- Hydrelia sanguiniplaga Swinhoe, 1902
- Hydrelia scotozona Yazaki, 1995
- Hydrelia sericea (Butler, 1880)
- Hydrelia shioyana (Matsumura, 1927)
- Hydrelia speciosa Inoue, 1992
- Hydrelia subcingulata Inoue, 1987
- Hydrelia sublatsaria Wehrli, 1938
- Hydrelia subobliquaria (Moore, 1868)
- Hydrelia subtestacea Inoue, 1982
- Hydrelia sylvata (Denis & Schiffermuller, 1775) - waved carpet
- Hydrelia tenera (Staudinger, 1897)
- Hydrelia terraenovae Krogerus, 1954
- Hydrelia ulula Bastelberger, 1911
- Hydrelia undularia (Leech, 1897)
- Hydrelia undulosata (Moore, 1888)

== Former species ==
- Asthenotricha argyridia (H. argyridia (Butler, 1894))
- Asthenotricha candace (H. candace Prout, 1929)
- Asthenotricha costalis (H. costalis Aurivillius, 1910)
- Asthenotricha meruana (H. meruana Aurivillius, 1910)
- Asthenotricha sjostedti (H. sjostedti Aurivillius, 1910)
