= H. nepalensis =

H. nepalensis may refer to:

- Haemaphysalis nepalensis, a hard tick
- Hamaspora nepalensis, a rust fungus
- Haplocosmia nepalensis, a true tarantula
- Haploporus nepalensis, a bracket fungus
- Hedera nepalensis, a perennial ivy
- Hemisodorcus nepalensis, a stag beetle
- Hepialiscus nepalensis, an Asian moth
- Hersilia nepalensis, a long-spinnered bark spider
- Heterometrus nepalensis, a giant forest scorpion
- Hexatoma nepalensis, a crane fly
- Himalmartensus nepalensis, a three-clawed spider
- Himalphalangium nepalensis, a daddy longlegs
- Hoplia nepalensis, a scarab beetle
- Hydrelia nepalensis, an Asian moth
- Hydrocotyle nepalensis, a perennial plant
- Hydroscapha nepalensis, a water beetle
