= Asthenotricha pycnoconia =

Scientific classification
- Kingdom: Animalia
- Phylum: Arthropoda
- Clade: Pancrustacea
- Class: Insecta
- Order: Lepidoptera
- Family: Geometridae
- Genus: Asthenotricha
- Species: A. pycnoconia

Binomial name
- Asthenotricha pycnoconia Janse, 1933

Species of moth

Asthenotricha pycnoconia is a moth in the family Geometridae first described by Anthonie Johannes Theodorus Janse in 1933. It is found in Cameroon, Kenya, Malawi, South Africa, Tanzania and Uganda.
