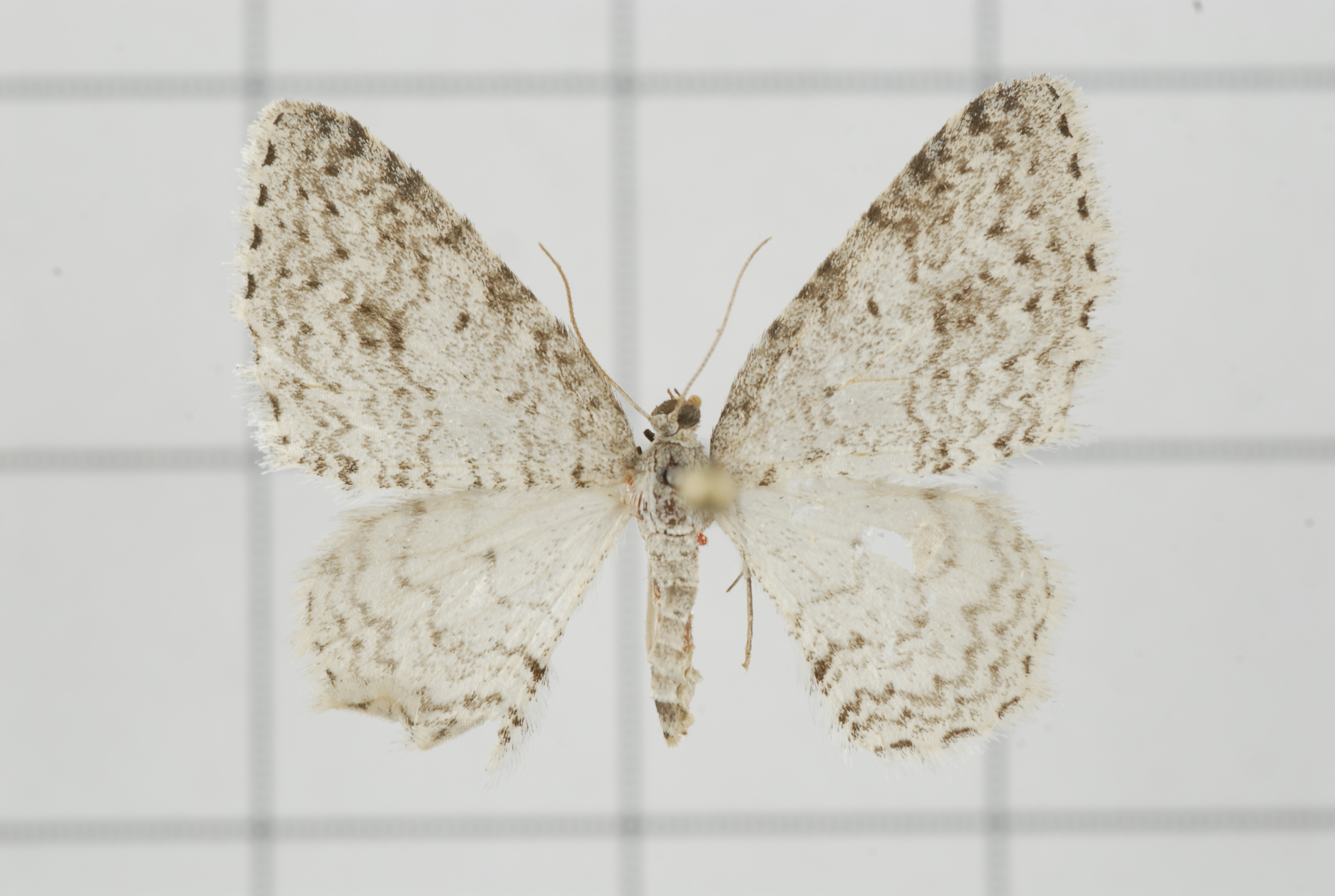

Scientific classification
- Kingdom: Animalia
- Phylum: Arthropoda
- Clade: Pancrustacea
- Class: Insecta
- Order: Lepidoptera
- Family: Geometridae
- Genus: Hydrelia
- Species: H. ulula

Binomial name
- Hydrelia ulula Bastelberger, 1911

= Hydrelia ulula =

Species of moth

Hydrelia ulula is a moth in the family Geometridae first described by Max Bastelberger in 1911. It is native to Taiwan.
