= Asthenotricha torata =

Scientific classification
- Kingdom: Animalia
- Phylum: Arthropoda
- Clade: Pancrustacea
- Class: Insecta
- Order: Lepidoptera
- Family: Geometridae
- Genus: Asthenotricha
- Species: A. torata

Binomial name
- Asthenotricha torata L. B. Prout, 1932

Species of moth

Asthenotricha torata is a moth in the family Geometridae first described by Louis Beethoven Prout in 1932. It is found on Grande Comore in the Comoros and on Madagascar.
