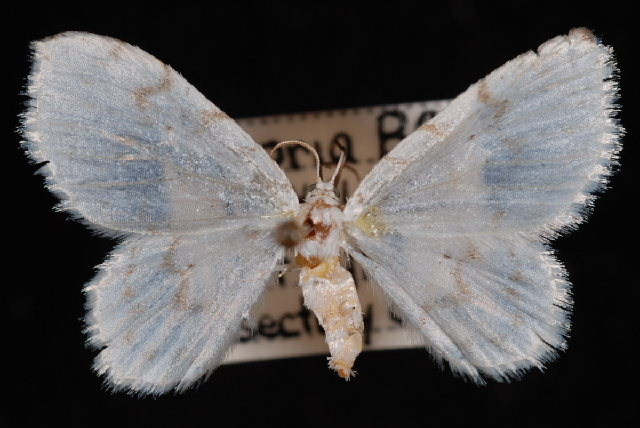

Scientific classification
- Kingdom: Animalia
- Phylum: Arthropoda
- Clade: Pancrustacea
- Class: Insecta
- Order: Lepidoptera
- Family: Geometridae
- Genus: Hydrelia
- Species: H. albifera

Binomial name
- Hydrelia albifera (Walker, 1866)

Synonyms
- Acidalia albifera Walker, 1866; Asthena albifera; Acidalia albogilvaria Morrison, 1874; Corycia triseriata Packard, 1874

= Hydrelia albifera =

Species of moth

Hydrelia albifera, the fragile white carpet moth, is a moth in the family Geometridae. The species was first described by Francis Walker in 1866. It is found from Newfoundland to British Columbia, south in the east to the Gulf states. The habitat consists of deciduous and mixed-wood forests.

The wingspan is 16–18 mm. There is one generation per year in the north, while two may occur further south. Adults are on wing from May to August.

The larvae feed on the leaves of Cornus stolonifera, Cornus alternafolia and Betula papyrifera.
