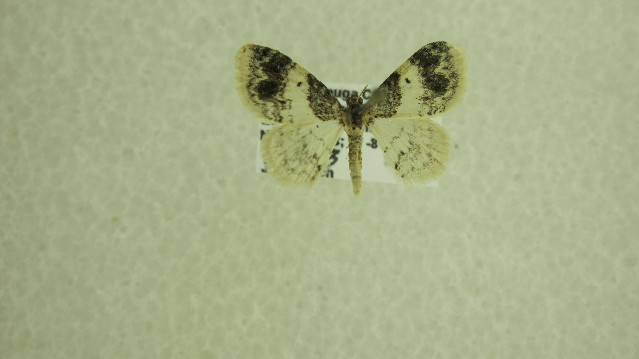

Scientific classification
- Kingdom: Animalia
- Phylum: Arthropoda
- Clade: Pancrustacea
- Class: Insecta
- Order: Lepidoptera
- Family: Geometridae
- Genus: Hydrelia
- Species: H. condensata

Binomial name
- Hydrelia condensata (Walker 1862)

Synonyms
- Melanthia condensata Walker, 1862

= Hydrelia condensata =

Species of moth

Hydrelia condensata is a moth in the family Geometridae. It is found in North America, including Indiana, Maryland, Massachusetts, Minnesota, New Brunswick, New Hampshire, Ohio, Pennsylvania, Quebec, Tennessee and West Virginia.

The wingspan is about 18 mm.
