= Hydrelia sublatsaria =

Scientific classification
- Kingdom: Animalia
- Phylum: Arthropoda
- Clade: Pancrustacea
- Class: Insecta
- Order: Lepidoptera
- Family: Geometridae
- Genus: Hydrelia
- Species: H. sublatsaria

Binomial name
- Hydrelia sublatsaria Wehrli, 1938

Species of moth

Hydrelia sublatsaria is a moth in the family Geometridae first described by Wehrli in 1938. It is found in China.
