= Asthenotricha deficiens =

Scientific classification
- Kingdom: Animalia
- Phylum: Arthropoda
- Clade: Pancrustacea
- Class: Insecta
- Order: Lepidoptera
- Family: Geometridae
- Genus: Asthenotricha
- Species: A. deficiens

Binomial name
- Asthenotricha deficiens Herbulot, 1954

Species of moth

Asthenotricha deficiens is a moth in the family Geometridae first described by Claude Herbulot in 1954. It is found on Madagascar.
