= Hydrelia fuscocastanea =

Scientific classification
- Kingdom: Animalia
- Phylum: Arthropoda
- Clade: Pancrustacea
- Class: Insecta
- Order: Lepidoptera
- Family: Geometridae
- Genus: Hydrelia
- Species: H. fuscocastanea

Binomial name
- Hydrelia fuscocastanea Inoue, 1982

Species of moth

Hydrelia fuscocastanea is a moth in the family Geometridae first described by Hiroshi Inoue in 1982. It is found in Nepal.
