= Hydrelia leucogramma =

Scientific classification
- Kingdom: Animalia
- Phylum: Arthropoda
- Clade: Pancrustacea
- Class: Insecta
- Order: Lepidoptera
- Family: Geometridae
- Genus: Hydrelia
- Species: H. leucogramma

Binomial name
- Hydrelia leucogramma Wehrli, 1931

Species of moth

Hydrelia leucogramma is a moth in the family Geometridae first described by Wehrli in 1931. It is found in China.
