= Hydrelia ornata =

Scientific classification
- Kingdom: Animalia
- Phylum: Arthropoda
- Clade: Pancrustacea
- Class: Insecta
- Order: Lepidoptera
- Family: Geometridae
- Genus: Hydrelia
- Species: H. ornata

Binomial name
- Hydrelia ornata (Moore, 1868)

Synonyms
- Hyria ornata Moore, 1868

Species of moth

Hydrelia ornata is a moth in the family Geometridae first described by Frederic Moore in 1868. It is found in Nepal, China and Sikkim, India.
