= Asthenotricha proschora =

Scientific classification
- Kingdom: Animalia
- Phylum: Arthropoda
- Clade: Pancrustacea
- Class: Insecta
- Order: Lepidoptera
- Family: Geometridae
- Genus: Asthenotricha
- Species: A. proschora

Binomial name
- Asthenotricha proschora D. S. Fletcher, 1958

Species of moth

Asthenotricha proschora is a moth in the family Geometridae. It was described by David Stephen Fletcher in 1958. It is found in the Democratic Republic of the Congo and Uganda.
