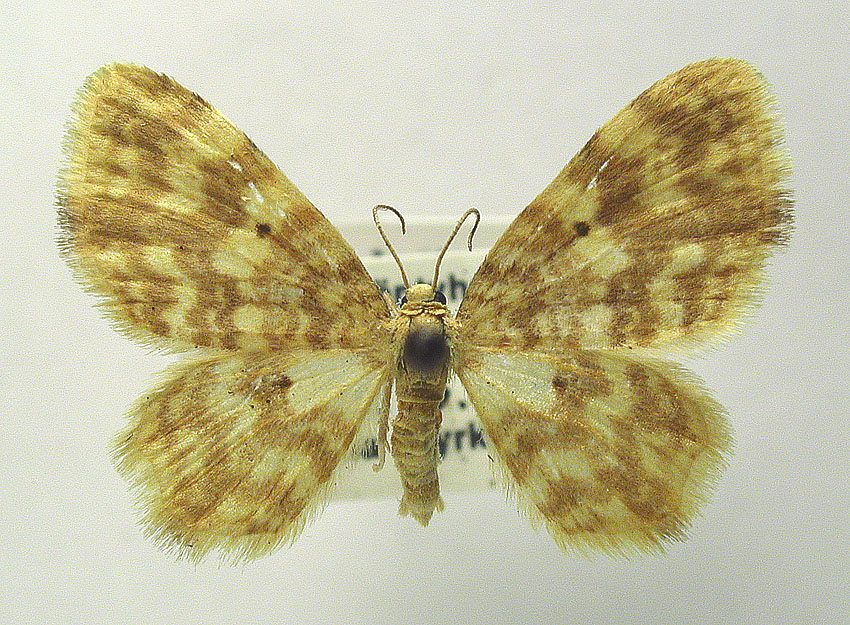

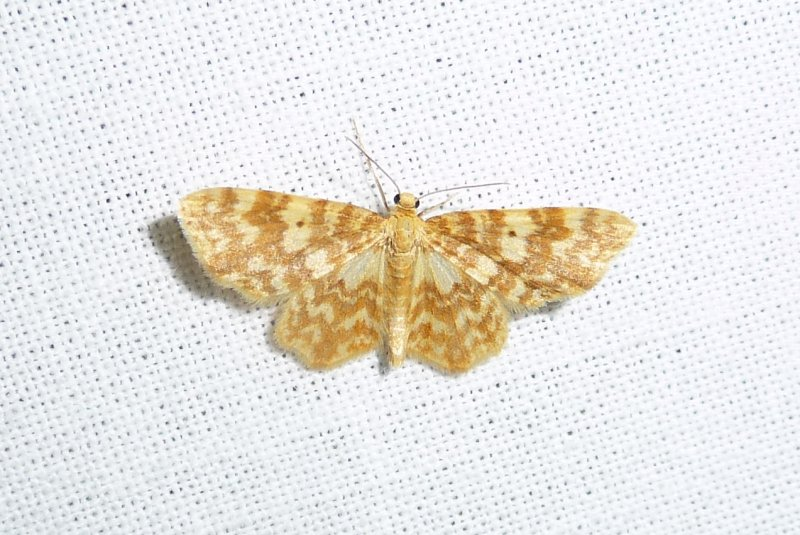

Scientific classification
- Kingdom: Animalia
- Phylum: Arthropoda
- Clade: Pancrustacea
- Class: Insecta
- Order: Lepidoptera
- Family: Geometridae
- Genus: Hydrelia
- Species: H. flammeolaria

Binomial name
- Hydrelia flammeolaria (Hufnagel, 1767)

Synonyms
- Phalaena flammeolaria Hufnagel, 1767; Phalaena centrata Fabricius, 1776; Asthena chibiana Matsumura, 1925; Geometra flavicata Thunberg, 1784; Phalaena flavostrigata Donovan, 1806; Geometra luteata Denis & Schiffermüller, 1775; Phalaena sinuosata Giorna, 1791

= Hydrelia flammeolaria =

Species of moth

Hydrelia flammeolaria, the small yellow wave, is a moth of the family Geometridae. The species was first described by Johann Siegfried Hufnagel in 1767 It is found in most of the Palearctic realm, from western Europe to Japan.

The wingspan is 14–20 mm. It is similar to Asthena albulata, but can be distinguished from this on the fact that the brown-yellow areas of the wings are about the same size as the white (in A.albulata the white colour dominates) and that the forewing has a small, brown spot. The forewings are white with about six fairly wide, wavy, brownish-yellow cross-bands that sometimes flow partially together. In the middle of the wing there is a small, brown spot. The hindwings are white with three brownish-yellow cross-bands. The larva is light green with white longitudinal stripes on either side of the back.

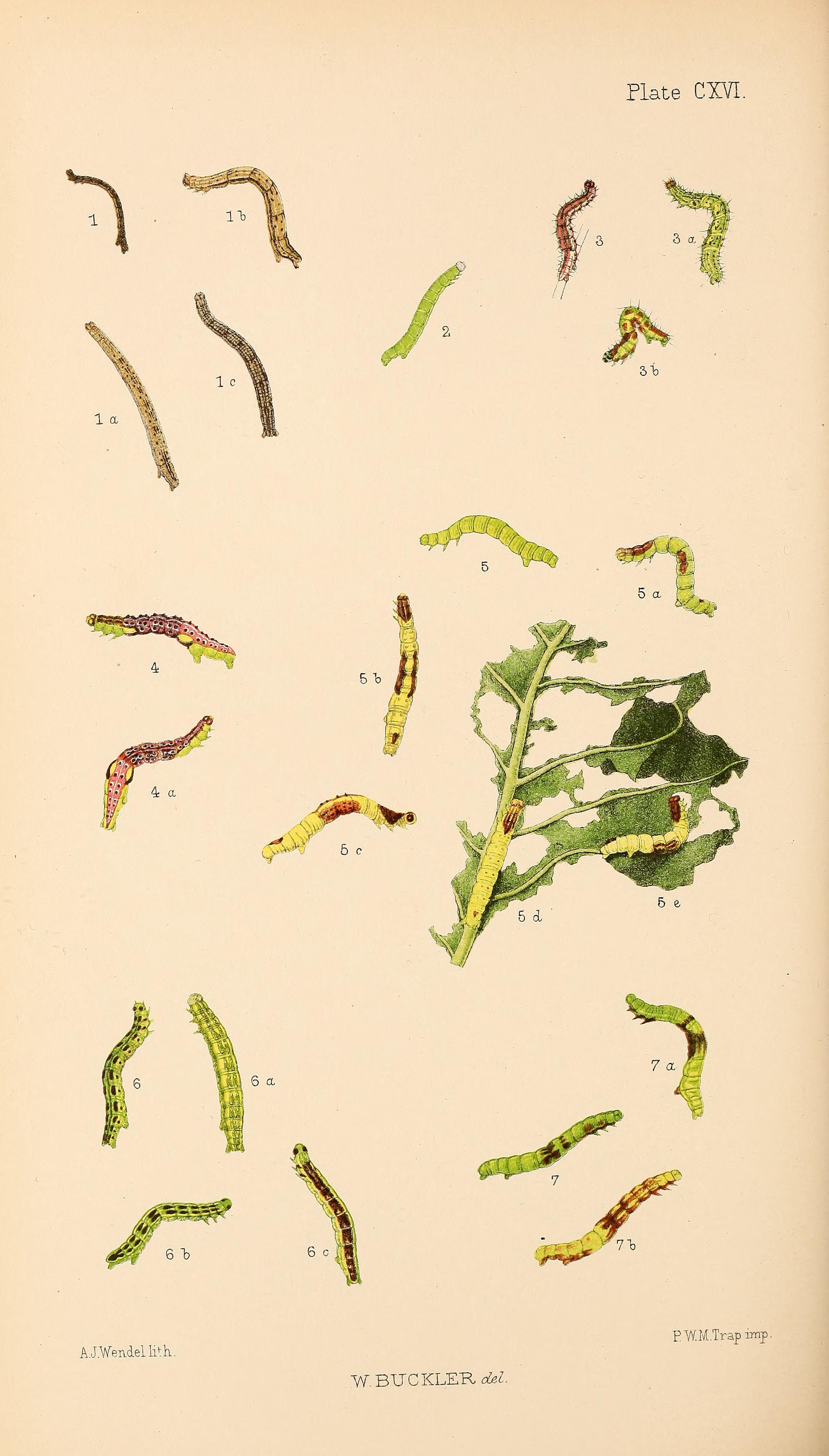
Fig 2. Larva after final moult

There is one generation per year, with adults on wing from mid-May to August.

The larvae feed on various deciduous trees, including Alnus (including Alnus glutinosa and Alnus incana) and Acer (including Acer campestris) species. Larvae can be found from July to September. It overwinters as a pupa.
