= Hydrelia bella =

Scientific classification
- Kingdom: Animalia
- Phylum: Arthropoda
- Clade: Pancrustacea
- Class: Insecta
- Order: Lepidoptera
- Family: Geometridae
- Genus: Hydrelia
- Species: H. bella

Binomial name
- Hydrelia bella (Wileman, 1916)

Synonyms
- Venusia bella Wileman, 1916

Species of moth

Hydrelia bella is a moth in the family Geometridae first described by Alfred Ernest Wileman in 1916. It is found in China.
