= Hydrelia luteosparsata =

Scientific classification
- Kingdom: Animalia
- Phylum: Arthropoda
- Clade: Pancrustacea
- Class: Insecta
- Order: Lepidoptera
- Family: Geometridae
- Genus: Hydrelia
- Species: H. luteosparsata

Binomial name
- Hydrelia luteosparsata Sterneck, 1928

Species of moth

Hydrelia luteosparsata is a moth in the family Geometridae first described by Sterneck in 1928. It is found in China.
