= Asthenotricha inutilis =

Scientific classification
- Kingdom: Animalia
- Phylum: Arthropoda
- Clade: Pancrustacea
- Class: Insecta
- Order: Lepidoptera
- Family: Geometridae
- Genus: Asthenotricha
- Species: A. inutilis

Binomial name
- Asthenotricha inutilis Warren, 1901

Species of moth

Asthenotricha inutilis is a moth in the family Geometridae first described by William Warren in 1901. It is found in Cameroon, the Democratic Republic of the Congo, Kenya, South Africa, Tanzania and Uganda.
