= Asthenotricha ansorgei =

Scientific classification
- Kingdom: Animalia
- Phylum: Arthropoda
- Clade: Pancrustacea
- Class: Insecta
- Order: Lepidoptera
- Family: Geometridae
- Genus: Asthenotricha
- Species: A. ansorgei

Binomial name
- Asthenotricha ansorgei Warren, 1899

Species of moth

Asthenotricha ansorgei is a moth in the family Geometridae first described by William Warren in 1899. It is found in Equatorial Guinea (Bioko), Ethiopia, Kenya, Tanzania and Uganda.
