= Hydrelia microptera =

Scientific classification
- Kingdom: Animalia
- Phylum: Arthropoda
- Clade: Pancrustacea
- Class: Insecta
- Order: Lepidoptera
- Family: Geometridae
- Genus: Hydrelia
- Species: H. microptera

Binomial name
- Hydrelia microptera Inoue, 1987

Species of moth

Hydrelia microptera is a moth in the family Geometridae first described by Hiroshi Inoue in 1987. It is found in China and Nepal.
