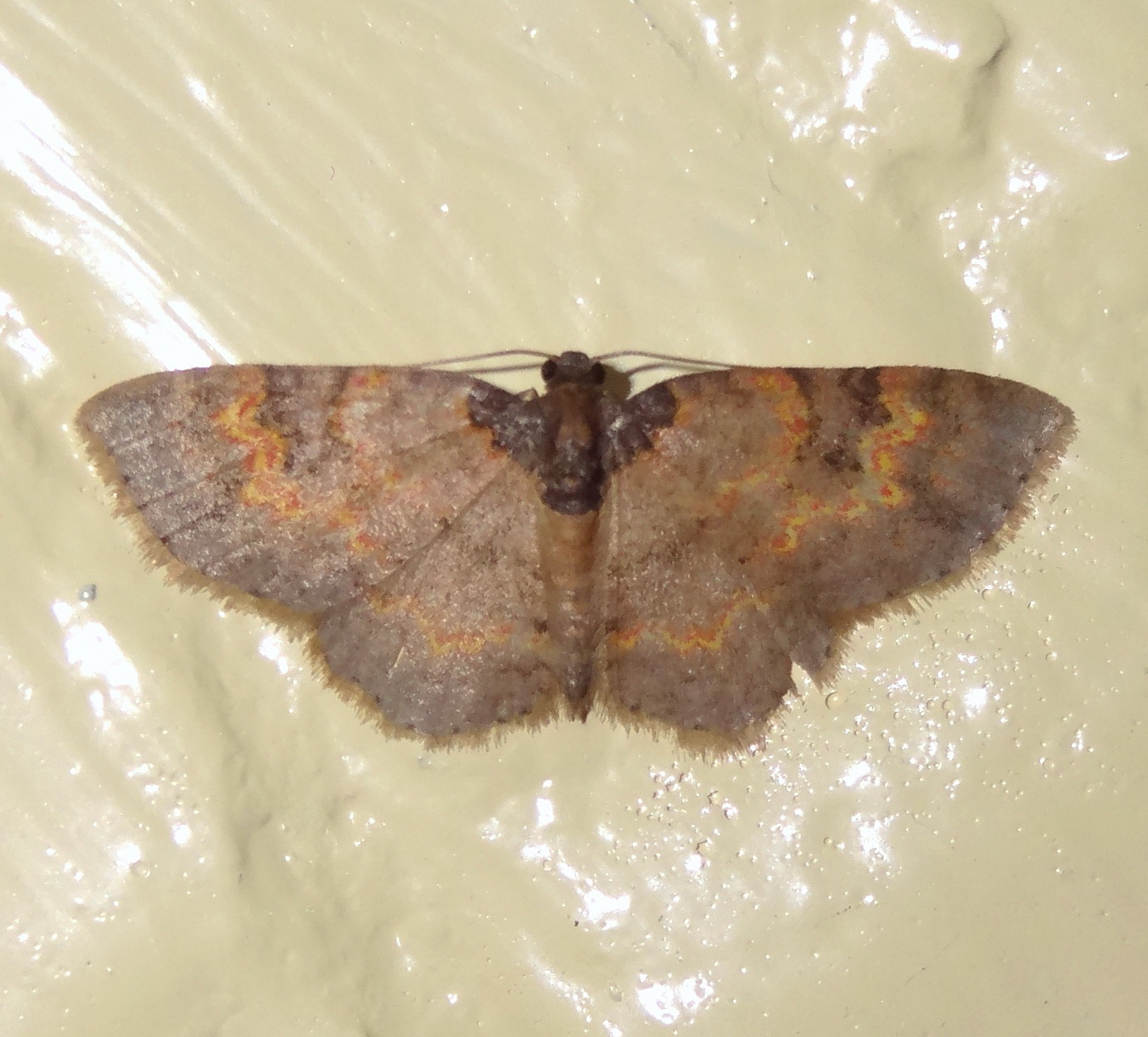

Scientific classification
- Kingdom: Animalia
- Phylum: Arthropoda
- Clade: Pancrustacea
- Class: Insecta
- Order: Lepidoptera
- Family: Geometridae
- Genus: Hydrelia
- Species: H. bicolorata

Binomial name
- Hydrelia bicolorata (Moore, 1868)

Synonyms
- Hyria bicolorata Moore, 1868; Eupithecia ferruginaria Moore, 1868

= Hydrelia bicolorata =

Species of insect

Hydrelia bicolorata is a moth in the family Geometridae first described by Frederic Moore in 1868. It is found in China and Sikkim, India.
