= Hydrelia undulosata =

Scientific classification
- Kingdom: Animalia
- Phylum: Arthropoda
- Clade: Pancrustacea
- Class: Insecta
- Order: Lepidoptera
- Family: Geometridae
- Genus: Hydrelia
- Species: H. undulosata

Binomial name
- Hydrelia undulosata (Moore, 1888)

Synonyms
- Hyria undulosata Moore, 1888

Species of moth

Hydrelia undulosata is a moth in the family Geometridae first described by Frederic Moore in 1888. It is found in India.
