= Hydrelia rufigrisea =

Scientific classification
- Kingdom: Animalia
- Phylum: Arthropoda
- Clade: Pancrustacea
- Class: Insecta
- Order: Lepidoptera
- Family: Geometridae
- Genus: Hydrelia
- Species: H. rufigrisea

Binomial name
- Hydrelia rufigrisea (Warren, 1893)

Synonyms
- Asthena rufigrisea Warren, 1893

Species of moth

Hydrelia rufigrisea is a moth in the family Geometridae first described by William Warren in 1893. It is found in China and Sikkim, India.
