= Asthenotricha amblycoma =

Scientific classification
- Kingdom: Animalia
- Phylum: Arthropoda
- Clade: Pancrustacea
- Class: Insecta
- Order: Lepidoptera
- Family: Geometridae
- Genus: Asthenotricha
- Species: A. amblycoma

Binomial name
- Asthenotricha amblycoma L. B. Prout, 1935

Species of moth

Asthenotricha amblycoma is a moth in the family Geometridae first described by Louis Beethoven Prout in 1935. It is found in Equatorial Guinea, Cameroon and Kenya.
