= Asthenotricha pythia =

Scientific classification
- Kingdom: Animalia
- Phylum: Arthropoda
- Clade: Pancrustacea
- Class: Insecta
- Order: Lepidoptera
- Family: Geometridae
- Genus: Asthenotricha
- Species: A. pythia

Binomial name
- Asthenotricha pythia Debauche, 1938

Species of moth

Asthenotricha pythia is a moth in the family Geometridae first described by Hubert Robert Debauche in 1938. It is found in the Democratic Republic of the Congo and Uganda.
