= Hydrelia subtestacea =

Scientific classification
- Kingdom: Animalia
- Phylum: Arthropoda
- Clade: Pancrustacea
- Class: Insecta
- Order: Lepidoptera
- Family: Geometridae
- Genus: Hydrelia
- Species: H. subtestacea

Binomial name
- Hydrelia subtestacea Inoue, 1982

Species of moth

Hydrelia subtestacea is a moth in the family Geometridae first described by Hiroshi Inoue in 1982. It is found in China and Nepal.
