= Asthenotricha unipecten =

Scientific classification
- Kingdom: Animalia
- Phylum: Arthropoda
- Clade: Pancrustacea
- Class: Insecta
- Order: Lepidoptera
- Family: Geometridae
- Genus: Asthenotricha
- Species: A. unipecten

Binomial name
- Asthenotricha unipecten (L. B. Prout, 1915)

Synonyms
- Hydrelia unipecten Prout, 1915; Hydrelia unipecten tamsi Prout, 1935

Species of moth

Asthenotricha unipecten is a moth in the family Geometridae first described by Louis Beethoven Prout in 1915. It is found in the Democratic Republic of the Congo, Kenya, Malawi, São Tomé and Príncipe and Uganda.
