= Asthenotricha flavicoma =

Scientific classification
- Kingdom: Animalia
- Phylum: Arthropoda
- Clade: Pancrustacea
- Class: Insecta
- Order: Lepidoptera
- Family: Geometridae
- Genus: Asthenotricha
- Species: A. flavicoma

Binomial name
- Asthenotricha flavicoma Warren, 1899

Species of moth

Asthenotricha flavicoma is a moth in the family Geometridae first described by William Warren in 1899. It is found in the Democratic Republic of the Congo, Cameroon, Uganda and Kenya.
