= Asthenotricha straba =

Scientific classification
- Kingdom: Animalia
- Phylum: Arthropoda
- Clade: Pancrustacea
- Class: Insecta
- Order: Lepidoptera
- Family: Geometridae
- Genus: Asthenotricha
- Species: A. straba

Binomial name
- Asthenotricha straba L. B. Prout, 1921

Species of moth

Asthenotricha straba is a moth in the family Geometridae first described by Louis Beethoven Prout in 1921. It is found in Angola, Cameroon, the Democratic Republic of the Congo, Kenya, Tanzania and Uganda.
