= Hydrelia aggerata =

Scientific classification
- Kingdom: Animalia
- Phylum: Arthropoda
- Clade: Pancrustacea
- Class: Insecta
- Order: Lepidoptera
- Family: Geometridae
- Genus: Hydrelia
- Species: H. aggerata

Binomial name
- Hydrelia aggerata Prout, 1938

Species of moth

Hydrelia aggerata is a moth in the family Geometridae. It is found in China.
