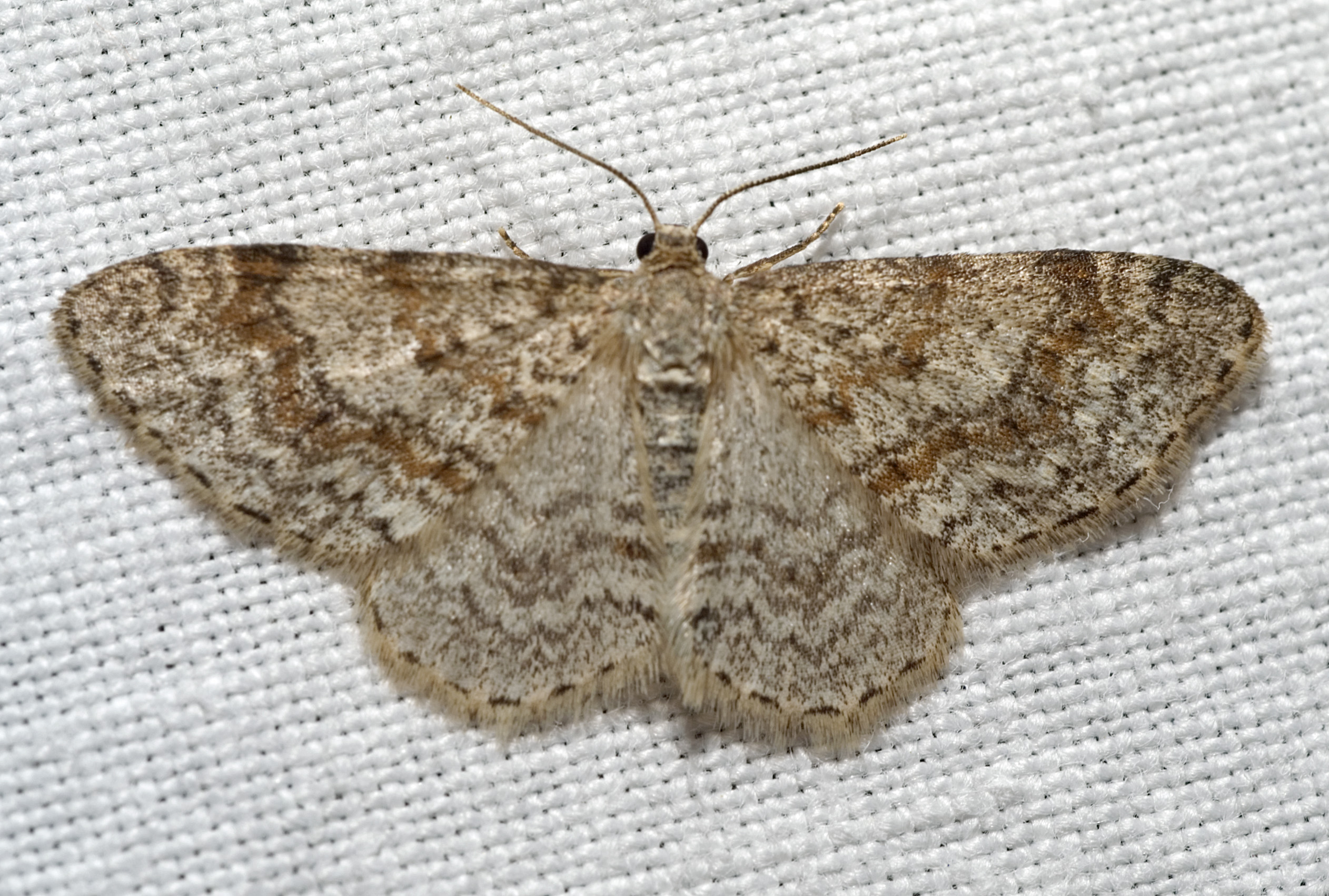

Scientific classification
- Kingdom: Animalia
- Phylum: Arthropoda
- Clade: Pancrustacea
- Class: Insecta
- Order: Lepidoptera
- Family: Geometridae
- Genus: Hydrelia
- Species: H. sylvata

Binomial name
- Hydrelia sylvata (Denis & Schiffermüller, 1775)

Synonyms
- Geometra sylvata Denis & Schiffermuller, 1775; Hydrelia sachalinensis Matsumura, 1925; Phalaena testaceata Donovan, 1810

= Hydrelia sylvata =

Species of moth

Hydrelia sylvata, the waved carpet, is a moth of the family Geometridae. It is found throughout the temperate parts of the Palearctic realm.

== Distribution ==
Their range extends from Iberia and the British Isles in the West, across Central and Eastern Europe, to Siberia and the Russian Far East and Japan. The northern border in Europe is central Fennoscandia, while the southern boundary is on the southern edge of the Alps.

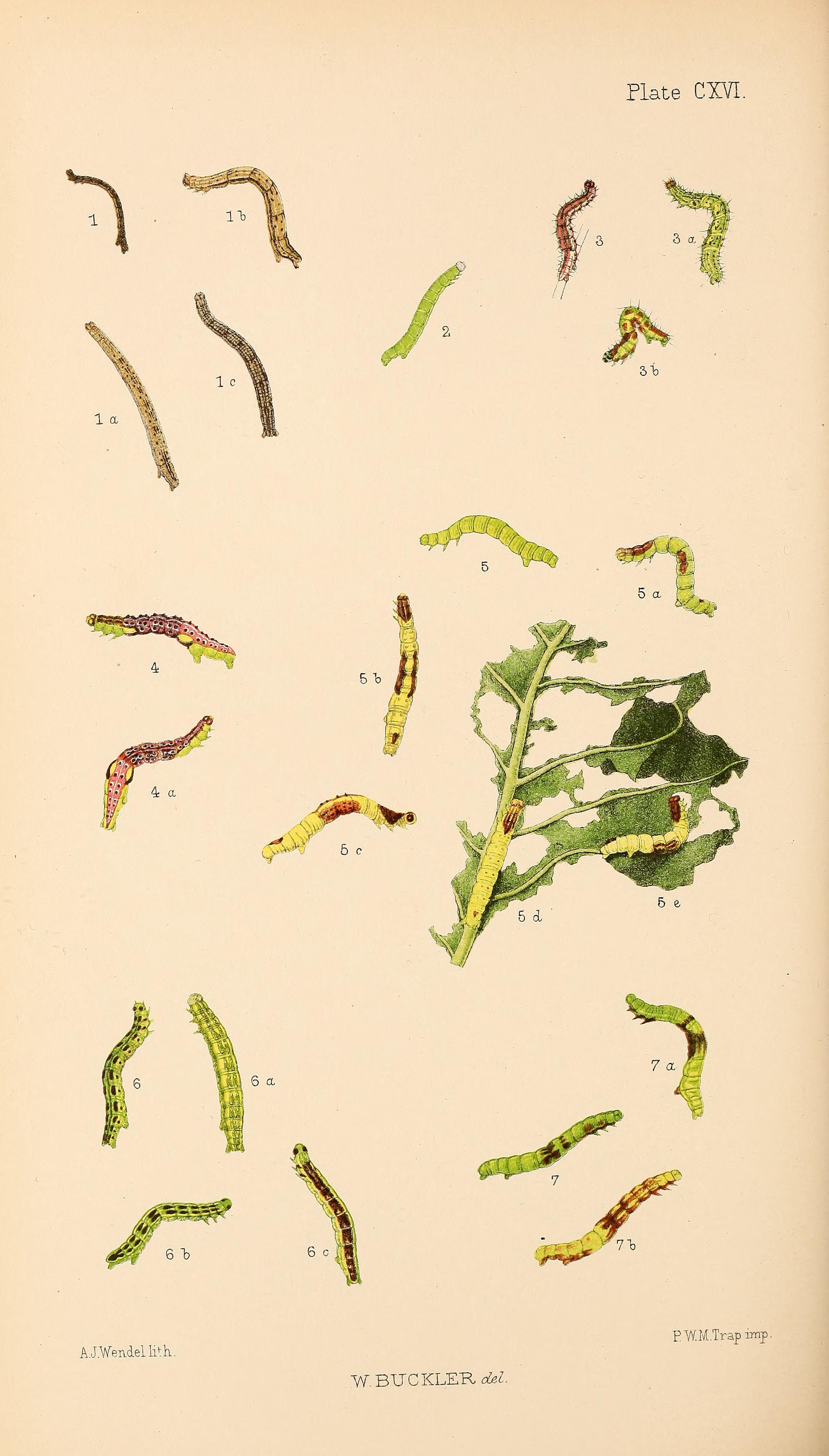
Fig 4,4a Larva after final moult

== Description ==
The wingspan is 27–30 mm. The ground colour of the forewings is whitish, grey whitish to light beige. The crosslines are light brown or dark brown, wavy. The midfield crossline is clearly delimited. A discal stain can be present in some specimens, but may be small and indistinct limited or absent. The hindwings have same pattern as the front wings. The marginal lines of the fore and hindwings are interrupted by the veins as a series of dashes. The patterns vary in intensity and arrangement.The relatively short and stubby caterpillar tapers at both the front and the rear end. It is purple-red to purple-brown, greenish on the sides at the front and back and rose-red in the middle. The dorsal line and some v-shaped spots on the back are white, the side-dorsal lines are only slightly lighter than the base colour. On the side of the 5th abdominal segment sit yellow spots. The point warts are bordered black but they are white. The small head is dark green and deeply notched. The shiny blue-green to greenish brown pupa has yellow-coloured segment incisions.

== Biology ==
The moth flies from May to July depending on the location.

The larvae mainly feed on the leaves of various trees, including ader (Alnus glutinosa), birch (Betula) and willow (Salix) species.
