= Asthenotricha malostigma =

Scientific classification
- Kingdom: Animalia
- Phylum: Arthropoda
- Clade: Pancrustacea
- Class: Insecta
- Order: Lepidoptera
- Family: Geometridae
- Genus: Asthenotricha
- Species: A. malostigma

Binomial name
- Asthenotricha malostigma L. B. Prout, 1921

Species of moth

Asthenotricha malostigma is a moth in the family Geometridae first described by Louis Beethoven Prout in 1921. It is found in the Democratic Republic of the Congo.
