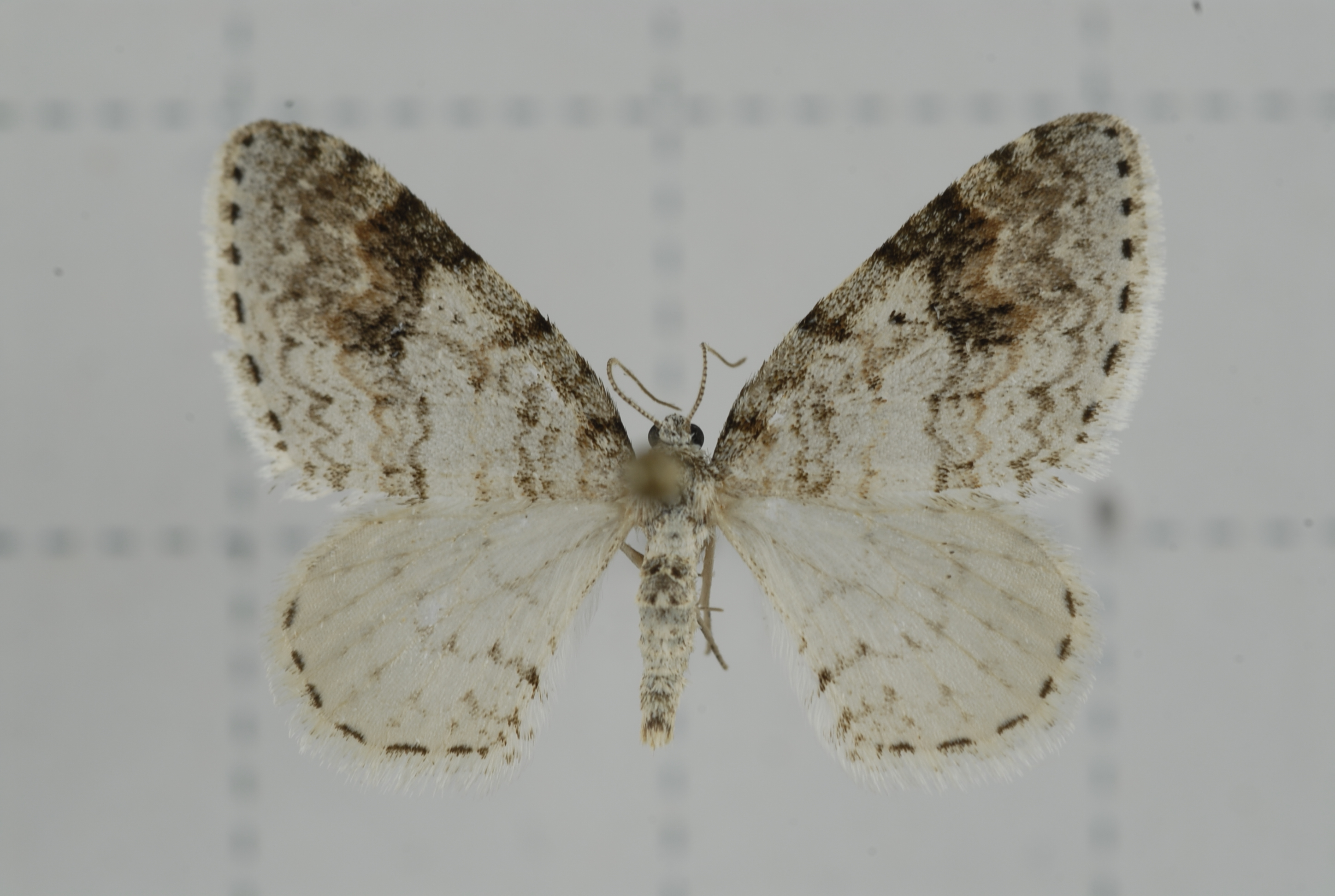

Scientific classification
- Kingdom: Animalia
- Phylum: Arthropoda
- Clade: Pancrustacea
- Class: Insecta
- Order: Lepidoptera
- Family: Geometridae
- Genus: Hydrelia
- Species: H. bicauliata

Binomial name
- Hydrelia bicauliata L. B. Prout, 1914

= Hydrelia bicauliata =

Species of moth

Hydrelia bicauliata is a moth in the family Geometridae first described by Louis Beethoven Prout in 1914. It is found in China, Japan, Korea and Russia.

The wingspan is 17–22 mm.
