= Hydrelia aurantiaca =

Scientific classification
- Kingdom: Animalia
- Phylum: Arthropoda
- Clade: Pancrustacea
- Class: Insecta
- Order: Lepidoptera
- Family: Geometridae
- Genus: Hydrelia
- Species: H. aurantiaca

Binomial name
- Hydrelia aurantiaca Hampson, 1903

Species of moth

Hydrelia aurantiaca is a moth in the family Geometridae first described by George Hampson in 1903. It is found in China and Nepal.
