= Hydrelia rubraria =

Scientific classification
- Kingdom: Animalia
- Phylum: Arthropoda
- Clade: Pancrustacea
- Class: Insecta
- Order: Lepidoptera
- Family: Geometridae
- Genus: Hydrelia
- Species: H. rubraria

Binomial name
- Hydrelia rubraria Hampson, 1903

Species of moth

Hydrelia rubraria is a moth in the family Geometridae first described by George Hampson in 1903. It is found in Tibet, China.
