= Hydrelia conspicuaria =

Scientific classification
- Kingdom: Animalia
- Phylum: Arthropoda
- Clade: Pancrustacea
- Class: Insecta
- Order: Lepidoptera
- Family: Geometridae
- Genus: Hydrelia
- Species: H. conspicuaria

Binomial name
- Hydrelia conspicuaria (Leech, 1897)

Synonyms
- Cambogia conspicuaria Leech, 1897; Palpoctenidia conspicuaria

Species of moth

Hydrelia conspicuaria is a moth in the family Geometridae first described by John Henry Leech in 1897. It is found in China.
