= Asthenotricha grandis =

Scientific classification
- Kingdom: Animalia
- Phylum: Arthropoda
- Clade: Pancrustacea
- Class: Insecta
- Order: Lepidoptera
- Family: Geometridae
- Genus: Asthenotricha
- Species: A. grandis

Binomial name
- Asthenotricha grandis Herbulot, 1997

Species of moth

Asthenotricha grandis is a moth in the family Geometridae first described by Claude Herbulot in 1997. It is found in Rwanda.
