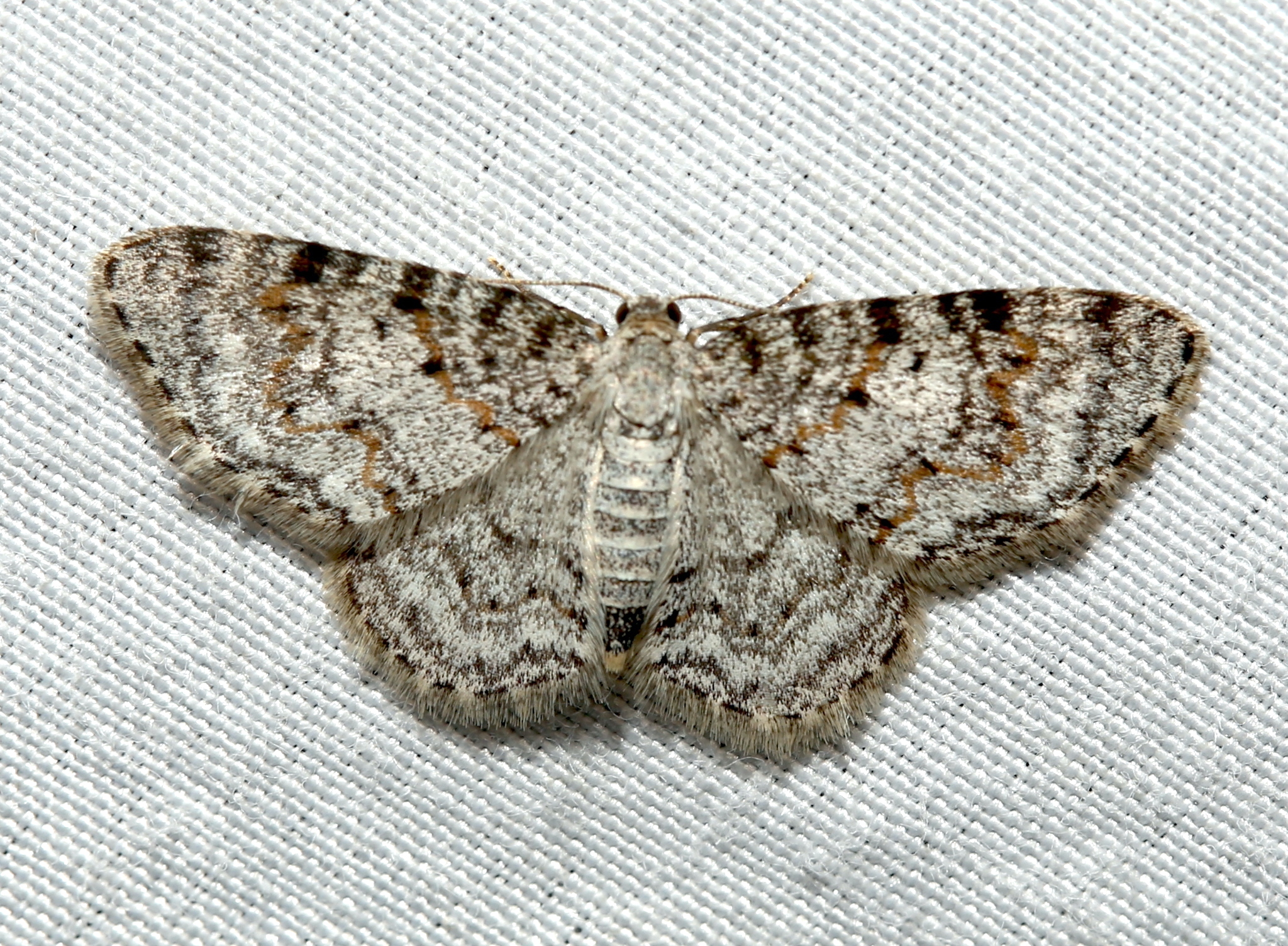

Scientific classification
- Kingdom: Animalia
- Phylum: Arthropoda
- Clade: Pancrustacea
- Class: Insecta
- Order: Lepidoptera
- Family: Geometridae
- Genus: Hydrelia
- Species: H. inornata

Binomial name
- Hydrelia inornata (Hulst, 1896)

Synonyms
- Tephroclystia inornata Hulst, 1896; Euchoeca exhumata Pearsall, 1906

= Hydrelia inornata =

Species of moth

Hydrelia inornata, the unadorned carpet moth, is a moth in the family Geometridae. It is found in North America, including Indiana, Iowa, Kentucky, Maine, Maryland, Massachusetts, New Brunswick, New Hampshire, New York, North Carolina, Nova Scotia, Ohio, Ontario, Pennsylvania, Quebec, Saskatchewan, Tennessee and West Virginia.

The wingspan is about 15 mm.
