= Hydrelia flavidula =

Scientific classification
- Kingdom: Animalia
- Phylum: Arthropoda
- Clade: Pancrustacea
- Class: Insecta
- Order: Lepidoptera
- Family: Geometridae
- Genus: Hydrelia
- Species: H. flavidula

Binomial name
- Hydrelia flavidula (Warren, 1907)

Synonyms
- Hastina flavidula Warren, 1907

Species of moth

'Hydrelia' flavidula is a moth in the family Geometridae first described by William Warren in 1907. It is found in Papua New Guinea.

Adults are sexually dimorphic.
