= Hydrelia sanguiniplaga =

Scientific classification
- Kingdom: Animalia
- Phylum: Arthropoda
- Clade: Pancrustacea
- Class: Insecta
- Order: Lepidoptera
- Family: Geometridae
- Genus: Hydrelia
- Species: H. sanguiniplaga

Binomial name
- Hydrelia sanguiniplaga C. Swinhoe, 1902

Species of moth

Hydrelia sanguiniplaga is a moth in the family Geometridae first described by Charles Swinhoe in 1902. It is found in China and Myanmar.
