= Asthenotricha lophopterata =

Scientific classification
- Domain: Eukaryota
- Kingdom: Animalia
- Phylum: Arthropoda
- Class: Insecta
- Order: Lepidoptera
- Family: Geometridae
- Genus: Asthenotricha
- Species: A. lophopterata

Binomial name
- Asthenotricha lophopterata (Guenée, [1858])

Synonyms
- Acidalia lophopterata Guenée, [1858]

Species of moth

Asthenotricha lophopterata is a moth in the family Geometridae. It was described by Achille Guenée in 1858. It is found in Madagascar and Réunion.
