= Hydrelia tenera =

Scientific classification
- Kingdom: Animalia
- Phylum: Arthropoda
- Clade: Pancrustacea
- Class: Insecta
- Order: Lepidoptera
- Family: Geometridae
- Genus: Hydrelia
- Species: H. tenera

Binomial name
- Hydrelia tenera (Staudinger, 1897)

Synonyms
- Cidaria tenera Staudinger, 1897

Species of moth

Hydrelia tenera is a moth in the family Geometridae first described by Otto Staudinger in 1897. It is found in Russia.
