= Hydrelia sericea =

Scientific classification
- Kingdom: Animalia
- Phylum: Arthropoda
- Clade: Pancrustacea
- Class: Insecta
- Order: Lepidoptera
- Family: Geometridae
- Genus: Hydrelia
- Species: H. sericea

Binomial name
- Hydrelia sericea (Butler, 1880)

Synonyms
- Noreia sericea Butler, 1880

Species of moth

Hydrelia sericea is a moth in the family Geometridae first described by Arthur Gardiner Butler in 1880. It is found in China, Nepal and the north-eastern Himalayas.

== Subspecies ==
- Hydrelia sericea sericea (China, Nepal, north-eastern Himalaya)
- Hydrelia sericea pampesia Prout, 1938 (Kashmir)
