= Asthenotricha serraticornis =

Scientific classification
- Kingdom: Animalia
- Phylum: Arthropoda
- Clade: Pancrustacea
- Class: Insecta
- Order: Lepidoptera
- Family: Geometridae
- Genus: Asthenotricha
- Species: A. serraticornis

Binomial name
- Asthenotricha serraticornis Warren, 1902

Species of moth

Asthenotricha serraticornis is a moth in the family Geometridae first described by William Warren in 1902. It is found in the Democratic Republic of the Congo, Kenya, Malawi, South Africa, Tanzania and Uganda.
