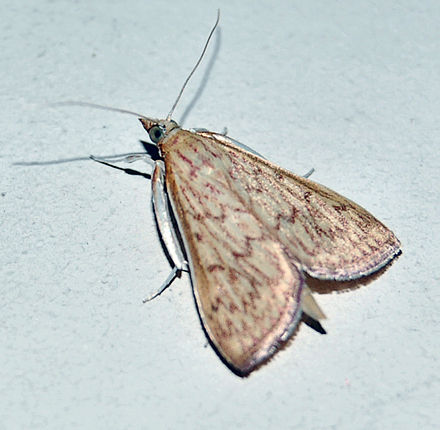

Scientific classification
- Kingdom: Animalia
- Phylum: Arthropoda
- Clade: Pancrustacea
- Class: Insecta
- Order: Lepidoptera
- Family: Geometridae
- Genus: Asthenotricha
- Species: A. dentatissima

Binomial name
- Asthenotricha dentatissima Warren, 1899

= Asthenotricha dentatissima =

Species of moth

Asthenotricha dentatissima is a moth in the family Geometridae. It was described by William Warren in 1899. It is found in the Democratic Republic of the Congo, Kenya, South Africa, Tanzania and Uganda.
