= Hydrelia nisaria =

Scientific classification
- Kingdom: Animalia
- Phylum: Arthropoda
- Clade: Pancrustacea
- Class: Insecta
- Order: Lepidoptera
- Family: Geometridae
- Genus: Hydrelia
- Species: H. nisaria

Binomial name
- Hydrelia nisaria (Christoph, 1881)

Synonyms
- Acidalia nisaria Christoph, 1881; Hydrelia nisaria japonica Inoue, 1944

Species of insect

Hydrelia nisaria is a moth in the family Geometridae first described by Hugo Theodor Christoph in 1881. It is found in the Russian Far East, China, Japan and Korea.

The wingspan is 13–16 mm.

The larvae have been recorded feeding on Acer ginnala.
