= Hydrelia subcingulata =

Scientific classification
- Kingdom: Animalia
- Phylum: Arthropoda
- Clade: Pancrustacea
- Class: Insecta
- Order: Lepidoptera
- Family: Geometridae
- Genus: Hydrelia
- Species: H. subcingulata

Binomial name
- Hydrelia subcingulata Inoue, 1987

Species of moth

Hydrelia subcingulata is a moth in the family Geometridae first described by Hiroshi Inoue in 1987. It is found in Nepal and China.
