= Hydrelia crocearia =

Scientific classification
- Kingdom: Animalia
- Phylum: Arthropoda
- Clade: Pancrustacea
- Class: Insecta
- Order: Lepidoptera
- Family: Geometridae
- Genus: Hydrelia
- Species: H. crocearia

Binomial name
- Hydrelia crocearia Hampson, 1896

Species of moth

Hydrelia crocearia is a moth in the family Geometridae first described by George Hampson in 1896. It is found in China.
