= Hydrelia flammulata =

Scientific classification
- Kingdom: Animalia
- Phylum: Arthropoda
- Clade: Pancrustacea
- Class: Insecta
- Order: Lepidoptera
- Family: Geometridae
- Genus: Hydrelia
- Species: H. flammulata

Binomial name
- Hydrelia flammulata (Bastelberger, 1911)

Synonyms
- Cambogia flammulata Bastelberger, 1911

Species of moth

Hydrelia flammulata is a moth in the family Geometridae first described by Max Bastelberger in 1911. It is found in China.
