= Asthenotricha =

- Asthenotricha tripogonias

Scientific classification
- Kingdom: Animalia
- Phylum: Arthropoda
- Class: Insecta
- Order: Lepidoptera
- Family: Geometridae
- Tribe: Asthenini
- Genus: Asthenotricha; Warren, 1899

Synonyms
- Astenotricha Debauche, 1938

Genus of moths

Asthenotricha is a genus of moths in the family Geometridae.

== Species ==
- The dentatissima group
  - Asthenotricha amblycoma Prout, 1935
  - Asthenotricha anisobapta Prout, 1932
  - Asthenotricha ansorgei Warren, 1899
  - Asthenotricha barnsae Prout, 1935
  - Asthenotricha comosissima Herbulot, 1970
  - Asthenotricha deficiens Herbulot, 1954
  - Asthenotricha dentatissima Warren, 1899
  - Asthenotricha fernandi Prout, 1935
  - Asthenotricha flavicoma Warren, 1899
  - Asthenotricha furtiva Herbulot, 1960
  - Asthenotricha grandis Herbulot, 1997
  - Asthenotricha lophopterata (Guenée, [1858])
  - Asthenotricha malostigma Prout, 1921
  - Asthenotricha nesiotes Herbulot, 1954
  - Asthenotricha parabolica Herbulot, 1954
  - Asthenotricha polydora Debauche, 1938
  - Asthenotricha proschora D. S. Fletcher, 1958
  - Asthenotricha psephotaenia Prout, 1935
  - Asthenotricha pycnoconia Janse, 1933
  - Asthenotricha pythia Debauche, 1938
  - Asthenotricha quadrata Herbulot, 1960
  - Asthenotricha semidivisa Warren, 1901
  - Asthenotricha serraticornis Warren, 1902
  - Asthenotricha straba Prout, 1921
  - Asthenotricha torata Prout, 1932
  - Asthenotricha tripogonias Prout, 1926
- The argyridia group
  - Asthenotricha argyridia (Butler, 1894)
  - Asthenotricha candace (Prout, 1929)
  - Asthenotricha costalis (Aurivillius, 1910)
  - Asthenotricha inutilis Warren, 1901
  - Asthenotricha meruana (Aurivillius, 1910)
  - Asthenotricha sjostedti (Aurivillius, 1910)
  - Asthenotricha strangulata Herbulot, 1953
  - Asthenotricha unipecten (Prout, 1915)
