= Hydrelia scotozona =

Scientific classification
- Kingdom: Animalia
- Phylum: Arthropoda
- Clade: Pancrustacea
- Class: Insecta
- Order: Lepidoptera
- Family: Geometridae
- Genus: Hydrelia
- Species: H. scotozona

Binomial name
- Hydrelia scotozona Yazaki, 1995

Species of moth

Hydrelia scotozona is a moth in the family Geometridae first described by Yazaki in 1995. It is found in Nepal.
