= Asthenotricha parabolica =

Scientific classification
- Kingdom: Animalia
- Phylum: Arthropoda
- Class: Insecta
- Order: Lepidoptera
- Family: Geometridae
- Genus: Asthenotricha
- Species: A. parabolica

Binomial name
- Asthenotricha parabolica Herbulot, 1954

Species of moth

Asthenotricha parabolica is a moth in the family Geometridae. It was described by Claude Herbulot in 1954. It is endemic to Madagascar.
