= Hydrelia latsaria =

Scientific classification
- Kingdom: Animalia
- Phylum: Arthropoda
- Clade: Pancrustacea
- Class: Insecta
- Order: Lepidoptera
- Family: Geometridae
- Genus: Hydrelia
- Species: H. latsaria

Binomial name
- Hydrelia latsaria (Oberthur, 1893)

Synonyms
- Acidalia latsaria Oberthur, 1893

Species of moth

Hydrelia latsaria is a moth in the family Geometridae first described by Charles Oberthür in 1893. It is found in China.
