= Asthenotricha furtiva =

Scientific classification
- Kingdom: Animalia
- Phylum: Arthropoda
- Class: Insecta
- Order: Lepidoptera
- Family: Geometridae
- Genus: Asthenotricha
- Species: A. furtiva

Binomial name
- Asthenotricha furtiva Herbulot, 1960

Species of moth

Asthenotricha furtiva is a moth in the family Geometridae. It is found in Madagascar.
