= Hydrelia elegans =

Scientific classification
- Kingdom: Animalia
- Phylum: Arthropoda
- Clade: Pancrustacea
- Class: Insecta
- Order: Lepidoptera
- Family: Geometridae
- Genus: Hydrelia
- Species: H. elegans

Binomial name
- Hydrelia elegans (Inoue, 1982)

Synonyms
- Palpoctenidia elegans Inoue, 1982

Species of moth

Hydrelia elegans is a moth in the family Geometridae. It lives in Nepal.
