= Asthenotricha tripogonias =

Scientific classification
- Kingdom: Animalia
- Phylum: Arthropoda
- Clade: Pancrustacea
- Class: Insecta
- Order: Lepidoptera
- Family: Geometridae
- Genus: Asthenotricha
- Species: A. tripogonias

Binomial name
- Asthenotricha tripogonias L. B. Prout, 1926

Species of moth

Asthenotricha tripogonias is a moth in the family Geometridae first described by Louis Beethoven Prout in 1926. It is found on Réunion.
