= Asthenotricha anisobapta =

Scientific classification
- Kingdom: Animalia
- Phylum: Arthropoda
- Clade: Pancrustacea
- Class: Insecta
- Order: Lepidoptera
- Family: Geometridae
- Genus: Asthenotricha
- Species: A. anisobapta

Binomial name
- Asthenotricha anisobapta L. B. Prout, 1932

Synonyms
- Asthenotricha lophopterata anisobapta Prout, 1932

Species of moth

Asthenotricha anisobapta is a moth in the family Geometridae first described by Louis Beethoven Prout in 1932. It is found in the Democratic Republic of the Congo, Ethiopia, Kenya, Rwanda, Tanzania and Uganda.
