= Asthenotricha strangulata =

Scientific classification
- Kingdom: Animalia
- Phylum: Arthropoda
- Clade: Pancrustacea
- Class: Insecta
- Order: Lepidoptera
- Family: Geometridae
- Genus: Asthenotricha
- Species: A. strangulata

Binomial name
- Asthenotricha strangulata Herbulot, 1953

Species of moth

Asthenotricha strangulata is a moth in the family Geometridae first described by Claude Herbulot in 1953. It is found in the Democratic Republic of the Congo, Kenya, Tanzania and Uganda.
