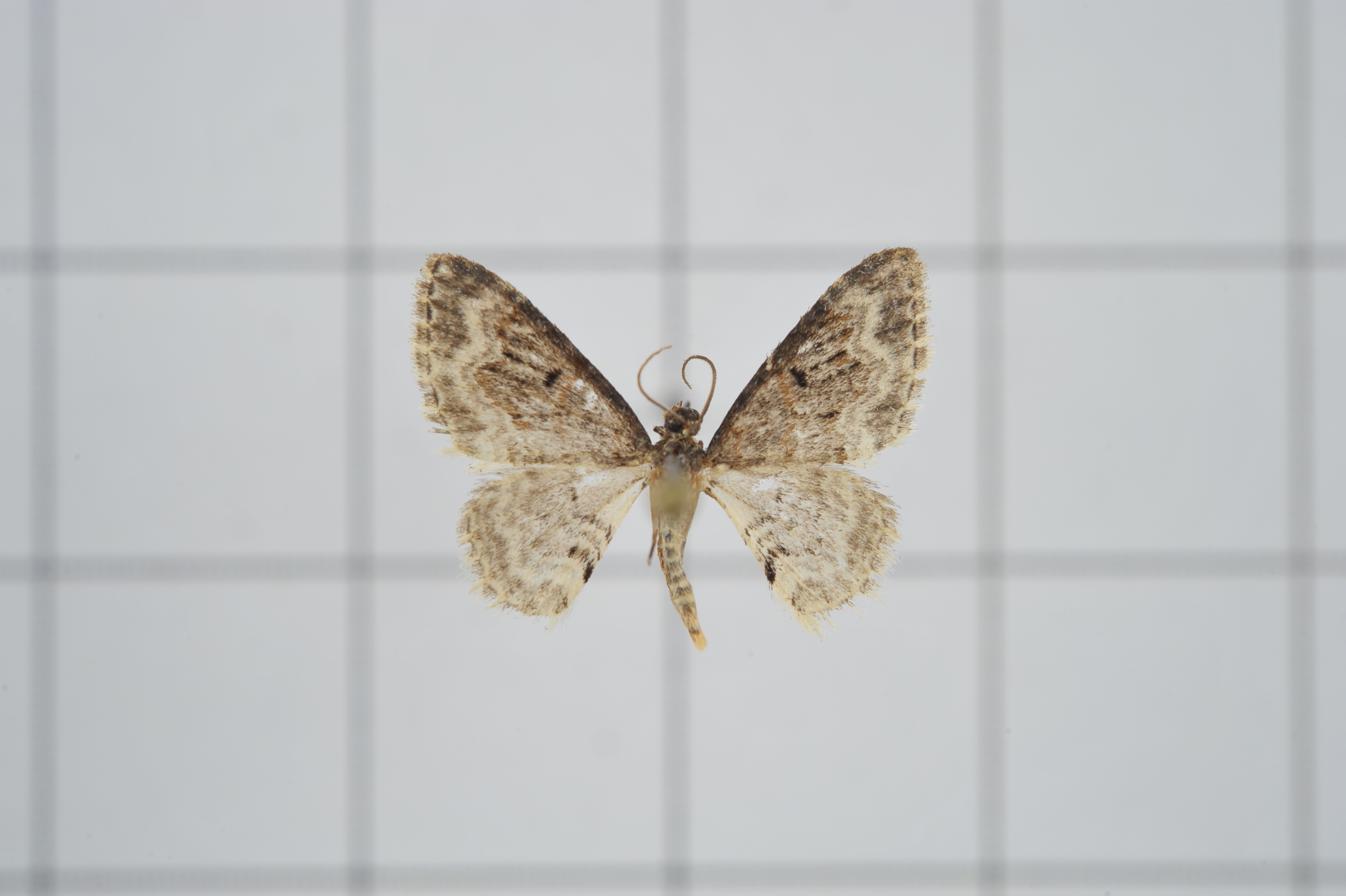

Scientific classification
- Kingdom: Animalia
- Phylum: Arthropoda
- Clade: Pancrustacea
- Class: Insecta
- Order: Lepidoptera
- Family: Geometridae
- Genus: Hydrelia
- Species: H. enisaria

Binomial name
- Hydrelia enisaria L. B. Prout, 1926

= Hydrelia enisaria =

Species of moth

Hydrelia enisaria is a moth in the family Geometridae first described by Louis Beethoven Prout in 1926. It is found in Myanmar.
