= Hydrelia terraenovae =

Scientific classification
- Kingdom: Animalia
- Phylum: Arthropoda
- Clade: Pancrustacea
- Class: Insecta
- Order: Lepidoptera
- Family: Geometridae
- Genus: Hydrelia
- Species: H. terraenovae

Binomial name
- Hydrelia terraenovae Krogerus, 1954

Species of moth

Hydrelia terraenovae is a moth in the family Geometridae first described by Harry Krogerus in 1954. It is found in Canada.
