= Hydrelia rhodoptera =

Scientific classification
- Kingdom: Animalia
- Phylum: Arthropoda
- Clade: Pancrustacea
- Class: Insecta
- Order: Lepidoptera
- Family: Geometridae
- Genus: Hydrelia
- Species: H. rhodoptera

Binomial name
- Hydrelia rhodoptera Hampson, 1895

Species of moth

Hydrelia rhodoptera is a moth in the family Geometridae first described by George Hampson in 1895. It is found in China and Sikkim, India.
