= Hydrelia impleta =

Scientific classification
- Kingdom: Animalia
- Phylum: Arthropoda
- Clade: Pancrustacea
- Class: Insecta
- Order: Lepidoptera
- Family: Geometridae
- Genus: Hydrelia
- Species: H. impleta

Binomial name
- Hydrelia impleta L. B. Prout, 1938

Species of moth

Hydrelia impleta is a moth in the family Geometridae first described by Louis Beethoven Prout in 1938. It is found in China.
