= Hydrelia lucata =

Scientific classification
- Kingdom: Animalia
- Phylum: Arthropoda
- Clade: Pancrustacea
- Class: Insecta
- Order: Lepidoptera
- Family: Geometridae
- Genus: Hydrelia
- Species: H. lucata

Binomial name
- Hydrelia lucata (Guenee, 1857)

Synonyms
- Asthena lucata Guenee, 1857

Species of moth

Hydrelia lucata, the light carpet moth, is a moth in the family Geometridae. It is found in North America, including Maine, Maryland, Michigan, Minnesota, New Brunswick, New Hampshire, Ohio, Ontario, Pennsylvania, Quebec, Tennessee and Wisconsin.
