= Hydrelia pavonica =

Scientific classification
- Kingdom: Animalia
- Phylum: Arthropoda
- Clade: Pancrustacea
- Class: Insecta
- Order: Lepidoptera
- Family: Geometridae
- Genus: Hydrelia
- Species: H. pavonica

Binomial name
- Hydrelia pavonica Xue, 1999

Species of moth

Hydrelia pavonica is a moth in the family Geometridae first described by Dayong Xue in 1999. It is found in China.
