= Hydrelia speciosa =

Scientific classification
- Kingdom: Animalia
- Phylum: Arthropoda
- Clade: Pancrustacea
- Class: Insecta
- Order: Lepidoptera
- Family: Geometridae
- Genus: Hydrelia
- Species: H. speciosa

Binomial name
- Hydrelia speciosa Inoue, 1992

Species of moth

Hydrelia speciosa is a moth in the family Geometridae first described by Hiroshi Inoue in 1992. It is found in Nepal.
