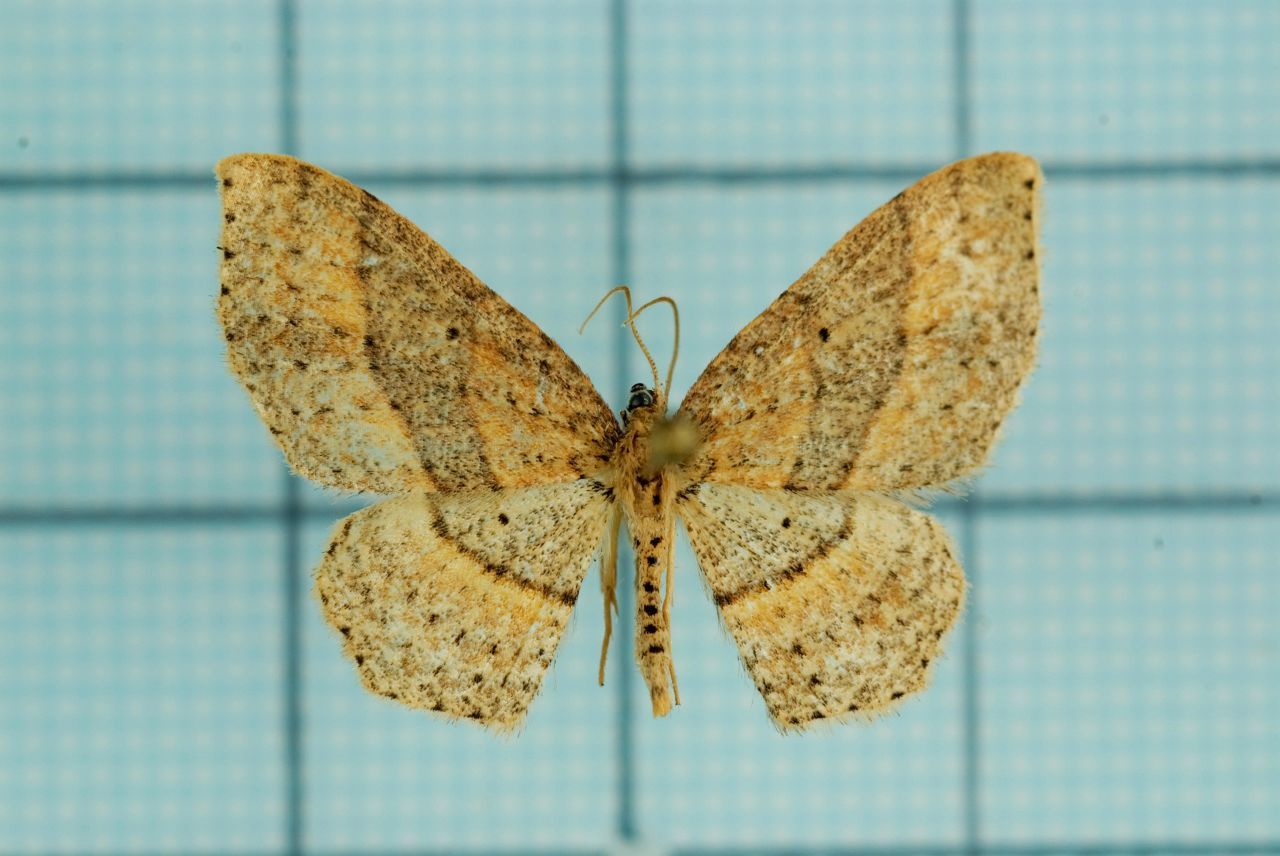

Scientific classification
- Kingdom: Animalia
- Phylum: Arthropoda
- Clade: Pancrustacea
- Class: Insecta
- Order: Lepidoptera
- Family: Geometridae
- Genus: Hydrelia
- Species: H. arizana

Binomial name
- Hydrelia arizana (Wileman, 1911)

Synonyms
- Acidalia arizana Wileman, 1911

= Hydrelia arizana =

Species of moth

Hydrelia arizana is a moth in the family Geometridae. It is found in Taiwan.
