= Hydrelia rubrivena =

Scientific classification
- Kingdom: Animalia
- Phylum: Arthropoda
- Clade: Pancrustacea
- Class: Insecta
- Order: Lepidoptera
- Family: Geometridae
- Genus: Hydrelia
- Species: H. rubrivena

Binomial name
- Hydrelia rubrivena Wileman, 1911

Species of moth

Hydrelia rubrivena is a moth in the family Geometridae first described by Alfred Ernest Wileman in 1911. It is found in Taiwan.
