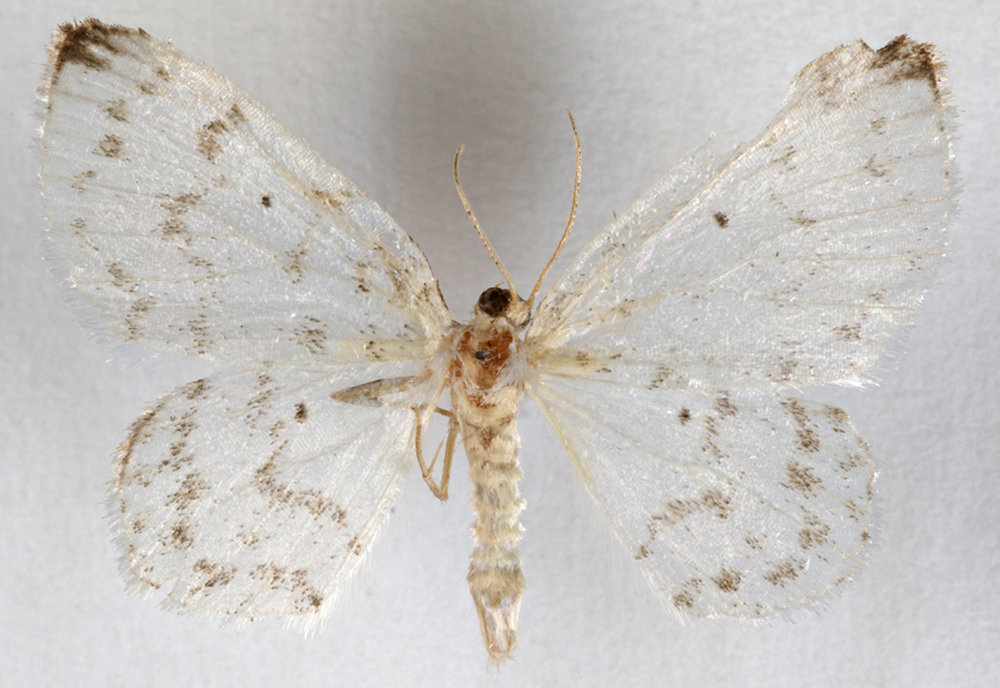

Scientific classification
- Kingdom: Animalia
- Phylum: Arthropoda
- Clade: Pancrustacea
- Class: Insecta
- Order: Lepidoptera
- Family: Geometridae
- Genus: Hydrelia
- Species: H. brunneifasciata

Binomial name
- Hydrelia brunneifasciata (Packard, 1876)

Synonyms
- Asthena brunneifasciata Packard, 1876; Euchoeca brunneifasciata

= Hydrelia brunneifasciata =

Species of moth

Hydrelia brunneifasciata is a species of moth in the family Geometridae. It is found from British Columbia, through Washington to California.
