= Asthenotricha polydora =

Scientific classification
- Kingdom: Animalia
- Phylum: Arthropoda
- Clade: Pancrustacea
- Class: Insecta
- Order: Lepidoptera
- Family: Geometridae
- Genus: Asthenotricha
- Species: A. polydora

Binomial name
- Asthenotricha polydora Debauche, 1938

Species of moth

Asthenotricha polydora is a moth in the family Geometridae first described by Hubert Robert Debauche in 1938. It is found in the Democratic Republic of the Congo, Rwanda and Uganda.
