= Asthenotricha semidivisa =

Scientific classification
- Kingdom: Animalia
- Phylum: Arthropoda
- Clade: Pancrustacea
- Class: Insecta
- Order: Lepidoptera
- Family: Geometridae
- Genus: Asthenotricha
- Species: A. semidivisa

Binomial name
- Asthenotricha semidivisa Warren, 1901

Species of moth

Asthenotricha semidivisa is a moth in the family Geometridae first described by William Warren in 1901. It is found in Cameroon, the Democratic Republic of the Congo, Kenya, Madagascar and Uganda.

== Subspecies ==
- Asthenotricha semidivisa semidivisa (Cameroon, Uganda, Madagascar)
- Asthenotricha semidivisa euchroma Prout, 1921 (Democratic Republic of the Congo)
