= Asthenotricha comosissima =

Scientific classification
- Kingdom: Animalia
- Phylum: Arthropoda
- Clade: Pancrustacea
- Class: Insecta
- Order: Lepidoptera
- Family: Geometridae
- Genus: Asthenotricha
- Species: A. comosissima

Binomial name
- Asthenotricha comosissima Herbulot, 1970

Species of moth

Asthenotricha comosissima is a species of moth of the family Geometridae. It is found in North Madagascar.

The length of its front wings is 16 mm.
