= Asthenotricha argyridia =

Scientific classification
- Kingdom: Animalia
- Phylum: Arthropoda
- Clade: Pancrustacea
- Class: Insecta
- Order: Lepidoptera
- Family: Geometridae
- Genus: Asthenotricha
- Species: A. argyridia

Binomial name
- Asthenotricha argyridia (Butler, 1894)

Synonyms
- Cataclysme argyridia Butler, 1894; Hydrelia argyridia (Butler, 1894); Eulype disparata Warren, 1897; Hydrelia disparata (Warren, 1897)

Species of moth

Asthenotricha argyridia is a moth in the family Geometridae. It was described by Arthur Gardiner Butler in 1894. It is found in the Democratic Republic of the Congo, Kenya, Rwanda, and Uganda.
