= Asthenotricha costalis =

Scientific classification
- Kingdom: Animalia
- Phylum: Arthropoda
- Clade: Pancrustacea
- Class: Insecta
- Order: Lepidoptera
- Family: Geometridae
- Genus: Asthenotricha
- Species: A. costalis

Binomial name
- Asthenotricha costalis (Aurivillius, 1910)

Synonyms
- Hydrelia costalis Aurivillius, 1910

Species of moth

Asthenotricha costalis is a moth in the family Geometridae first described by Per Olof Christopher Aurivillius in 1910. It is found in Kenya and Tanzania.
