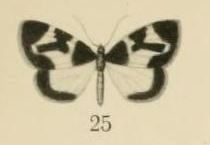

Scientific classification
- Kingdom: Animalia
- Phylum: Arthropoda
- Clade: Pancrustacea
- Class: Insecta
- Order: Lepidoptera
- Family: Geometridae
- Genus: Asthenotricha
- Species: A. meruana

Binomial name
- Asthenotricha meruana (Aurivillius, 1910)

Synonyms
- Hydrelia meruana Aurivillius, 1910

= Asthenotricha meruana =

Species of moth

Asthenotricha meruana is a moth in the family Geometridae first described by Per Olof Christopher Aurivillius in 1910. It is found in Tanzania.
