= Asthenotricha candace =

Scientific classification
- Kingdom: Animalia
- Phylum: Arthropoda
- Clade: Pancrustacea
- Class: Insecta
- Order: Lepidoptera
- Family: Geometridae
- Genus: Asthenotricha
- Species: A. candace

Binomial name
- Asthenotricha candace (L. B. Prout, 1929)

Synonyms
- Hydrelia candace Prout, 1929

Species of moth

Asthenotricha candace is a moth in the family Geometridae first described by Louis Beethoven Prout in 1929. It is found in Ethiopia.
