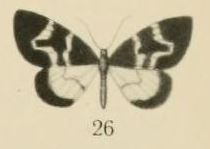
- Aurevilius, 1910. Pl.2-26-(Hydrelia) Haplolabida sjostedti (Aurivillius, 1910)

Scientific classification
- Kingdom: Animalia
- Phylum: Arthropoda
- Clade: Pancrustacea
- Class: Insecta
- Order: Lepidoptera
- Family: Geometridae
- Genus: Asthenotricha
- Species: A. sjostedti

Binomial name
- Asthenotricha sjostedti (Aurivillius, 1910)

Synonyms
- Hydrelia sjostedti Aurivillius, 1910; Hydrelia sjostedti mionoseista Prout, 1921

= Asthenotricha sjostedti =

Species of moth

Asthenotricha sjostedti is a moth in the family Geometridae first described by Per Olof Christopher Aurivillius in 1910. It is found in Kenya, Rwanda, the Democratic Republic of the Congo and Tanzania.

== Subspecies ==
- Asthenotricha sjostedti sjostedti (Kenya, Tanzania)
- Asthenotricha sjostedti mionoseista (Prout, 1921) (Rwanda, the Democratic Republic of the Congo)
