= List of Pedicia species =

List of fly species

This is a list of 106 species in Pedicia, a genus of hairy-eyed crane flies in the family Pediciidae.

== Pedicia species ==
- Pedicia aethiops Alexander, 1955^{i}
- Pedicia albivitta Walker, 1848^{i c g b} (giant eastern crane fly)
- Pedicia albivittata ^{i g}
- Pedicia ampla Doane, 1900^{i}
- Pedicia aperta (Coquillett, 1905)^{i}
- Pedicia apusenica Ujvarosi and Stary, 2003^{c g}
- Pedicia arctica Frey, 1921^{c g}
- Pedicia aspidoptera (Coquillett, 1905)^{i}
- Pedicia auripennis (Osten Sacken, 1859)^{i b}
- Pedicia autumnalis (Alexander, 1917)^{i b}
- Pedicia baikalica (Alexander, 1930)^{c g}
- Pedicia bellamyana Alexander, 1964^{i c g}
- Pedicia bianchii Alexander, 1966^{i}
- Pedicia bicomata Alexander, 1943^{i}
- Pedicia bidentifera Alexander, 1950^{i}
- Pedicia brachycera Alexander, 1933^{c g}
- Pedicia brevifurcata (Alexander, 1919)^{i}
- Pedicia calcar (Osten Sacken, 1859)^{i}
- Pedicia cascadensis Alexander, 1954^{i}
- Pedicia cervina (Alexander, 1917)^{i}
- Pedicia cinereicolor Alexander, 1958^{i g}
- Pedicia claggi (Alexander, 1930)^{i}
- Pedicia cockerelli Alexander, 1925^{c g}
- Pedicia constans (Doane, 1900)^{i}
- Pedicia contermina Walker, 1848^{i c g b}
- Pedicia cubitalis Alexander, 1933^{c g}
- Pedicia daimio (Matsumura, 1916)^{c g}
- Pedicia debilis (Williston, 1893)^{i g}
- Pedicia degenerata (Alexander, 1917)^{i}
- Pedicia depressiloba Alexander, 1945^{c g}
- Pedicia diaphana (Doane, 1900)^{i g}
- Pedicia dispar Savchenko, 1978^{c g}
- Pedicia ericarum Alexander, 1966^{c g}
- Pedicia euryptera Alexander, 1949^{i g}
- Pedicia exoloma (Doane, 1900)^{i}
- Pedicia falcifera Alexander, 1941^{i c g}
- Pedicia fenderiana Alexander, 1954^{i}
- Pedicia fimbriatula Alexander, 1953^{c g}
- Pedicia frigida (Alexander, 1919)^{i}
- Pedicia fulvicolor Alexander, 1945^{i}
- Pedicia fusca Ujvarosi and Balint, 2012^{c g}
- Pedicia gaudens (Alexander, 1925)^{c g}
- Pedicia gifuensis Kariya, 1934^{c g}
- Pedicia gigantea Alexander, 1940^{i}
- Pedicia glacialis (Alexander, 1917)^{i}
- Pedicia goldsworthyi Petersen, 2006^{c g}
- Pedicia grandior (Alexander, 1923)^{c g}
- Pedicia huffae Alexander, 1940^{i}
- Pedicia hynesiana Alexander, 1961^{i}
- Pedicia inconstans (Osten Sacken, 1859)^{i b}
- Pedicia issikiella Alexander, 1953^{c g}
- Pedicia johnsoni (Alexander, 1930)^{i}
- Pedicia katahdin (Alexander, 1914)^{i}
- Pedicia kuwayamai Alexander, 1966^{c g}
- Pedicia laetabilis Alexander, 1938^{c g}
- Pedicia lewisiana Alexander, 1958^{i c g}
- Pedicia littoralis (Meigen, 1804)^{c g}
- Pedicia lobifera Savchenko, 1986^{c g}
- Pedicia macateei (Alexander, 1919)^{i}
- Pedicia magnifica (Hine, 1903)^{i c g}
- Pedicia margarita Alexander, 1929^{i c g}
- Pedicia monophilus ^{i g}
- Pedicia nawai Kariya, 1934^{c g}
- Pedicia nielseni (Slipka, 1955)^{c g}
- Pedicia norikurae Alexander, 1958^{c g}
- Pedicia obtusa Osten Sacken, 1877^{i c g}
- Pedicia occulta (Meigen, 1830)^{c g}
- Pedicia pahasapa Alexander, 1958^{i}
- Pedicia pallens Savchenko, 1978^{c g}
- Pedicia pallida Savchenko, 1976^{c g}
- Pedicia paludicola (Alexander, 1916)^{i}
- Pedicia parvicellula Alexander, 1938^{i c g b}
- Pedicia patens Alexander, 1938^{c g}
- Pedicia perangusta Alexander, 1958^{i g}
- Pedicia persica Alexander, 1975^{c g}
- Pedicia procteriana Alexander, 1939^{i c g b}
- Pedicia protea (Alexander, 1918)^{i}
- Pedicia pumila Alexander, 1942^{i}
- Pedicia rainieria (Alexander, 1924)^{i}
- Pedicia riedeli (Lackschewitz, 1940)^{c g}
- Pedicia rivosa (Linnaeus, 1758)^{c g}
- Pedicia rubiginosa (Alexander, 1931)^{i}
- Pedicia savtshenkoi Paramonov, 2009^{c g}
- Pedicia semireducta Savchenko, 1978^{c g}
- Pedicia septentrionalis ^{i g}
- Pedicia seticauda (Alexander, 1924)^{c g}
- Pedicia setipennis (Alexander, 1931)^{c g}
- Pedicia shastensis Alexander, 1958^{i}
- Pedicia simplicistyla (Alexander, 1930)^{i}
- Pedicia simulata Alexander, 1938^{c g}
- Pedicia smithae Alexander, 1941^{i}
- Pedicia spinifera Stary, 1974^{c g}
- Pedicia staryi Savchenko, 1978^{c g}
- Pedicia straminea (Meigen, 1838)^{c g}
- Pedicia subfalcata Alexander, 1941^{c g}
- Pedicia subobtusa Alexander, 1949^{i c g}
- Pedicia subtransversa Alexander, 1933^{c g}
- Pedicia tacoma Alexander, 1949^{i}
- Pedicia tenuiloba Alexander, 1957^{c g}
- Pedicia tjederi Mendl, 1974^{c g}
- Pedicia truncata Alexander, 1941^{i g}
- Pedicia unigera Alexander, 1949^{i}
- Pedicia vernalis Osten Sacken^{i}
- Pedicia vetusta (Alexander, 1913)^{c g}
- Pedicia zangheriana Nielsen, 1950^{c g}
- Pedicia zernyi (Lackschewitz, 1940)^{c g}

Data sources: i = ITIS, c = Catalogue of Life, g = GBIF, b = Bugguide.net
