= D. maculata =

D. maculata may refer to:

- Dactyloceras maculata, an African moth
- Dactylorhiza maculata, a perennial plant
- Dellamora maculata, a tumbling flower beetle
- Deltophora maculata, a twirler moth
- Denisonia maculata, an elapid snake
- Dialeurolonga maculata, a true bug
- Dicranota maculata, a hairy-eyed cranefly
- Dictyolathys maculata, an araneomorph spider
- Dieffenbachia maculata, a perennial plant
- Diopatra maculata, a polychaete worm
- Diphtheroglyphus maculata, an invertebrate animal
- Diphucrania maculata, a jewel beetle
- Diploschema maculata, a longhorn beetle
- Diplura maculata, a funnel-web tarantula
- Diuris maculata, an orchid endemic to Australia
- Dolichovespula maculata, a North American wasp
- Dorstenia maculata, a New World herb
- Dorylomorpha maculata, a big-headed fly
- Doto maculata, a sea slug
- Drimiopsis maculata, a perennial herb
- Duvalia maculata, an Old World plant
