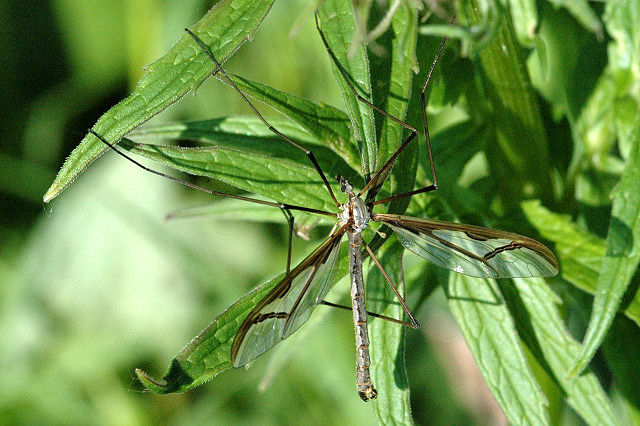
- Pedicia rivosa

Scientific classification
- Kingdom: Animalia
- Phylum: Arthropoda
- Class: Insecta
- Order: Diptera
- Infraorder: Tipulomorpha
- Superfamily: Tipuloidea
- Family: Pediciidae
- Subfamily: Pediciinae van der Wulp, 1877

Genera
- See text

= Pediciinae =

Subfamily of flies

The Pediciinae are a subfamily of "hairy-eyed" flies in the family Pediciidae, closely related to the Tipulidae (true crane flies). The subfamily comprises approximately 450 described species worldwide. Many genera, including Pedicia, are robust and inhabit aquatic or semi-aquatic environments, with larvae that are predatory on other aquatic invertebrates.

== Genera ==
- Dicranota Zetterstedt, 1838
- Heterangaeus Alexander, 1925
- Malaisemyia Alexander, 1950
- Nasiternella Wahlgren, 1904
- Nipponomyia Alexander, 1924
- Ornithodes Coquillett, 1900
- Pedicia Latreille, 1809
- Savchenkoiana Kocak, 1981
- Tricyphona Zetterstedt, 1837
