= Pedicia inconstans =

Scientific classification
- Domain: Eukaryota
- Kingdom: Animalia
- Phylum: Arthropoda
- Class: Insecta
- Order: Diptera
- Family: Pediciidae
- Genus: Pedicia
- Species: P. inconstans

Binomial name
- Pedicia inconstans (Osten Sacken, 1859)

Synonyms
- Amalopis inconstans Osten Sacken, 1848; Tricyphona inconstans Osten Sacken

Species of fly

Pedicia inconstans is a species of hairy-eyed crane fly in the family Pediciidae.

== Subspecies ==
These two subspecies belong to the species Pedicia inconstans:

- Pedicia inconstans calcaroides Alexander, 1940
- Pedicia inconstans inconstans Osten Sacken, 1848
