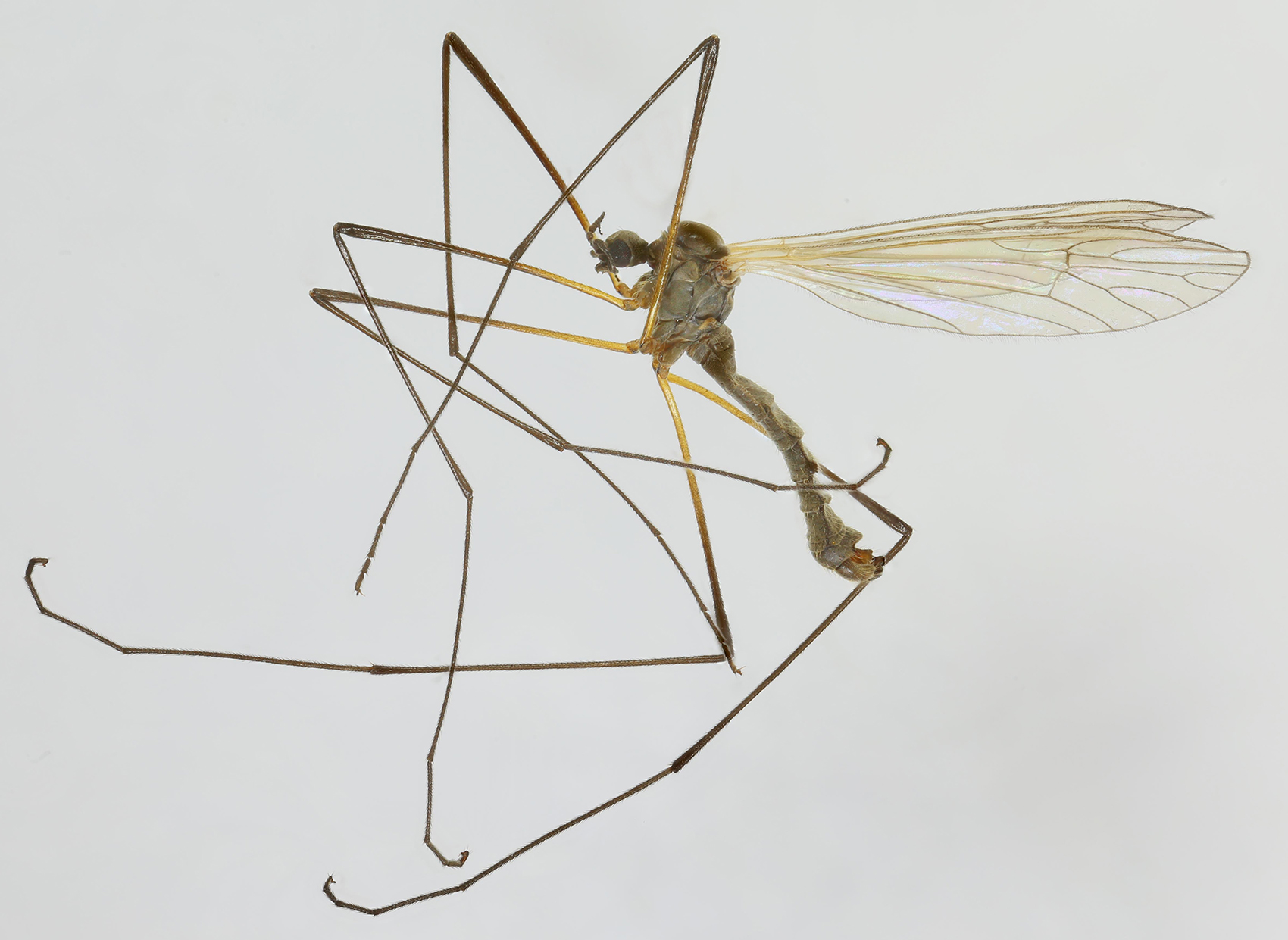
- Tricyphona immaculata North Wales

Scientific classification
- Kingdom: Animalia
- Phylum: Arthropoda
- Class: Insecta
- Order: Diptera
- Family: Pediciidae
- Genus: Tricyphona
- Species: T. immaculata

Binomial name
- Tricyphona immaculata (Meigen, 1804)

= Tricyphona immaculata =

Species of fly

Tricyphona immaculata is a species of fly in the family Pediciidae. It is found in the Palearctic.
