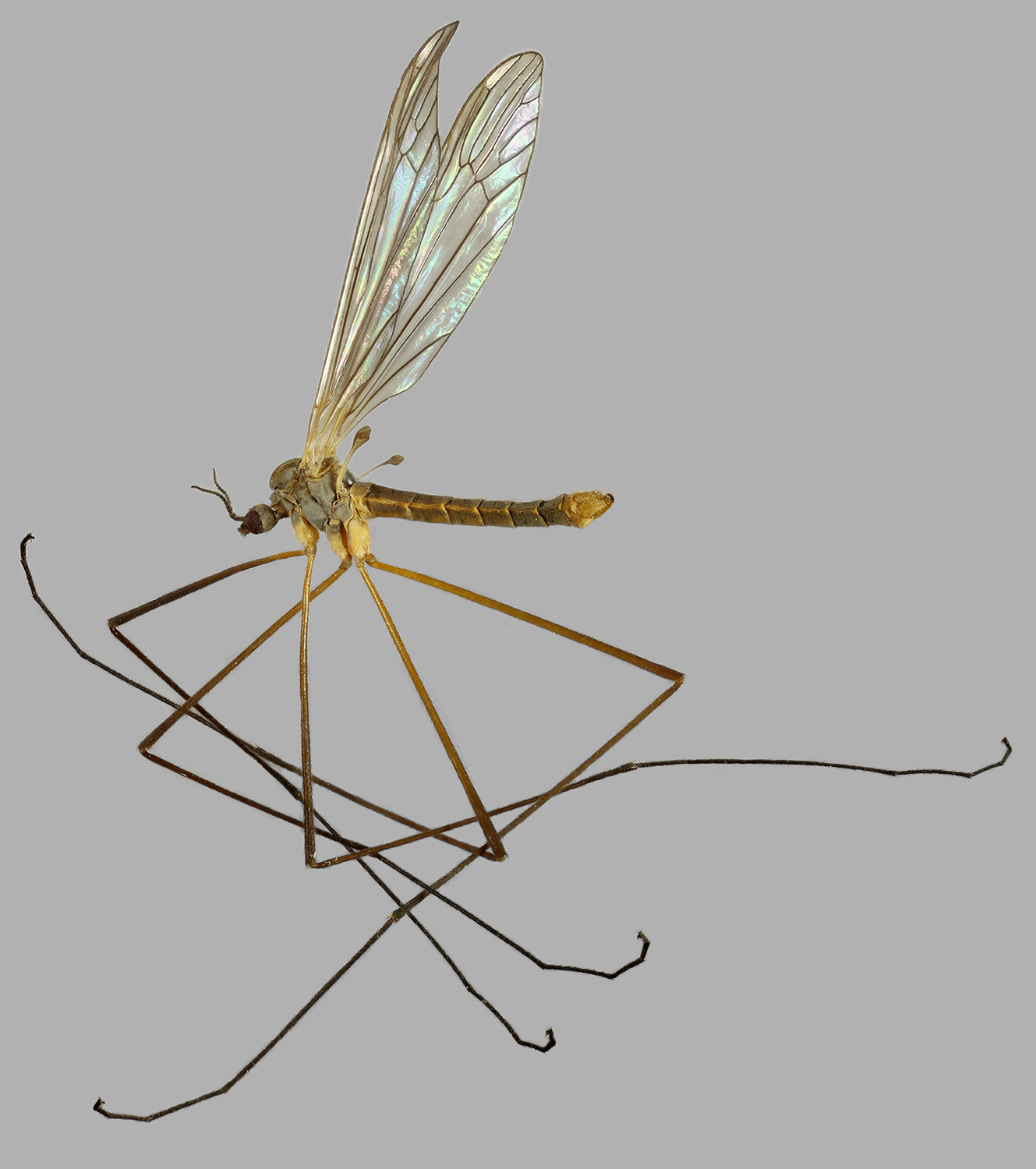
- Dicranota claripennis North Wales

Scientific classification
- Kingdom: Animalia
- Phylum: Arthropoda
- Clade: Pancrustacea
- Class: Insecta
- Order: Diptera
- Family: Pediciidae
- Genus: Dicranota
- Species: D. claripennis

Binomial name
- Dicranota claripennis (Verrall, 1888)

= Dicranota claripennis =

Species of fly

Dicranota claripennis is a species of fly in the family Pediciidae. It is found in the Palearctic.
