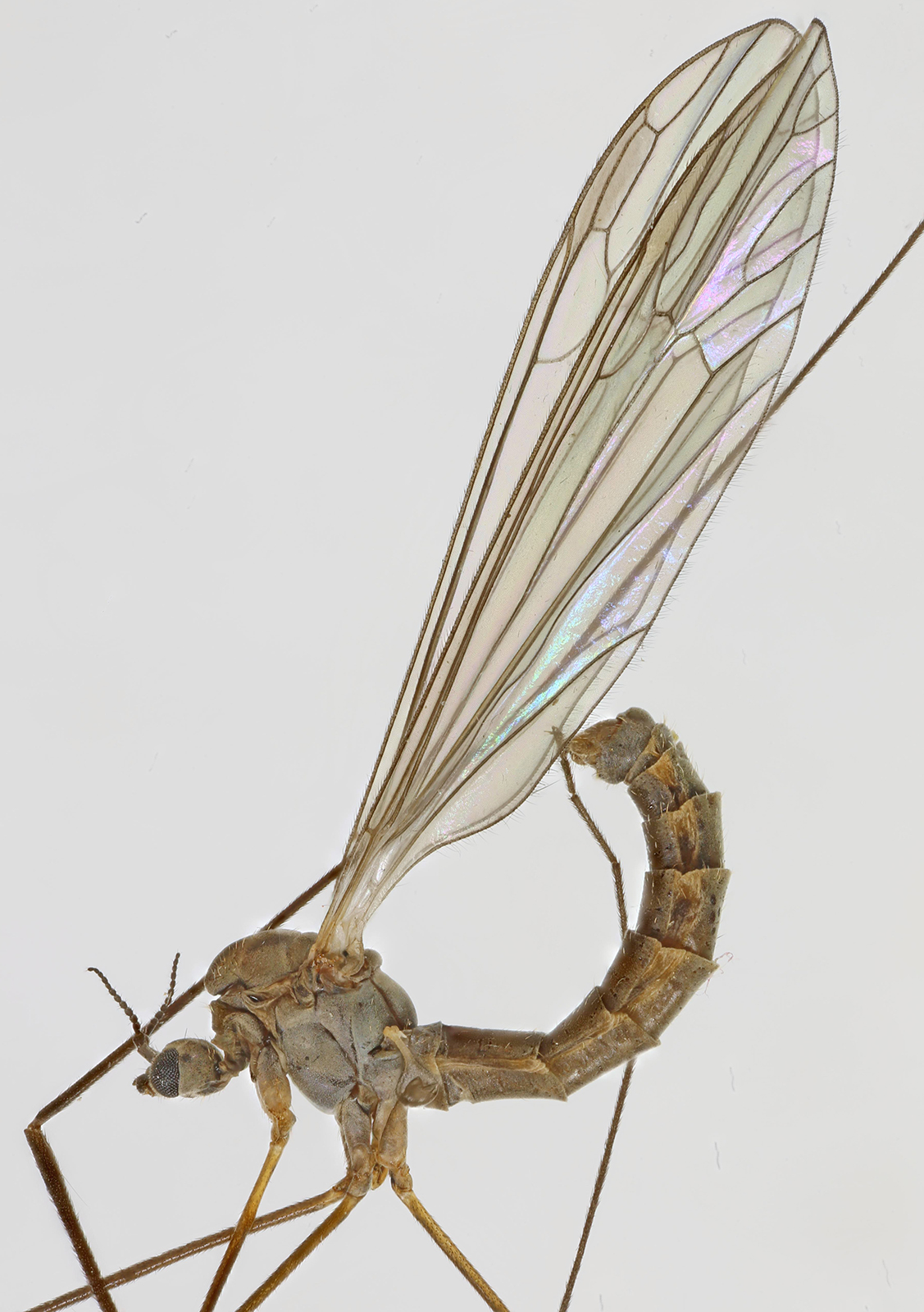
- Dicranota subtilis North Wales

Scientific classification
- Kingdom: Animalia
- Phylum: Arthropoda
- Clade: Pancrustacea
- Class: Insecta
- Order: Diptera
- Family: Pediciidae
- Genus: Dicranota
- Species: D. subtilis

Binomial name
- Dicranota subtilis Loew, 1871

= Dicranota subtilis =

Species of fly

Dicranota subtilis is a species of fly in the family Limoniidae. It is found in the Palearctic.
