= Pedicia autumnalis =

Scientific classification
- Domain: Eukaryota
- Kingdom: Animalia
- Phylum: Arthropoda
- Class: Insecta
- Order: Diptera
- Family: Pediciidae
- Genus: Pedicia
- Species: P. autumnalis

Binomial name
- Pedicia autumnalis (Alexander, 1917)

Synonyms
- Tricyphona autumnalis Alexander, 1917

Species of fly

Pedicia autumnalis is a species of hairy-eyed crane fly in the family Pediciidae.
