= Pedicia auripennis =

Scientific classification
- Domain: Eukaryota
- Kingdom: Animalia
- Phylum: Arthropoda
- Class: Insecta
- Order: Diptera
- Family: Pediciidae
- Genus: Pedicia
- Species: P. auripennis

Binomial name
- Pedicia auripennis (Osten Sacken, 1859)

Synonyms
- Amalopis auripennis Osten Sacken, 1859

Species of fly

Pedicia auripennis is a species of hairy-eyed crane fly in the family Pediciidae.

== Subspecies ==
These four subspecies belong to the species Pedicia auripennis:

- Pedicia auripennis anttenuata Alexander, 1941
- Pedicia auripennis auripennis Osten Sacken, 1859
- Pedicia auripennis breviclava Alexander, 1941
- Pedicia auripennis nephophila Alexander, 1941
