= Deltophora pauperella =

Scientific classification
- Kingdom: Animalia
- Phylum: Arthropoda
- Class: Insecta
- Order: Lepidoptera
- Family: Gelechiidae
- Genus: Deltophora
- Species: D. pauperella

Binomial name
- Deltophora pauperella Sattler, 1979

Species of moth

Deltophora pauperella is a moth of the family Gelechiidae. It is found in India (Punjab).

The length of the forewings is about 6.5 mm. The forewings are light ochreous, with dark brown markings.
