= Diploschema mandibulare =

Scientific classification
- Kingdom: Animalia
- Phylum: Arthropoda
- Class: Insecta
- Order: Coleoptera
- Suborder: Polyphaga
- Infraorder: Cucujiformia
- Family: Cerambycidae
- Genus: Diploschema
- Species: D. mandibulare

Binomial name
- Diploschema mandibulare E. Fuchs, 1964

Species of beetle

Diploschema mandibulare is a species of beetle in the family Cerambycidae. It was described by Ernst Fuchs in 1964.
