= Nasiternella =

Scientific classification
- Kingdom: Animalia
- Phylum: Arthropoda
- Class: Insecta
- Order: Diptera
- Family: Pediciidae
- Subfamily: Pediciinae
- Genus: Nasiternella; Wahlgren, 1904

Type species
- Limnobia varinervis Zetterstedt, 1851

Species
- See text

Genus of flies

Nasiternella is a genus of hairy-eyed craneflies (family Pediciidae) with a Holarctic distribution.

== Species ==
- Nasiternella grallator Alexander, 1962
- Nasiternella hyperborea (Osten Sacken, 1861)
- Nasiternella ignara Alexander, 1950
- Nasiternella regia Riedel, 1914
- Nasiternella tjederi Alexander, 1962
- Nasiternella varinervis (Zetterstedt, 1851)
