= Deltophora flavocincta =

Scientific classification
- Kingdom: Animalia
- Phylum: Arthropoda
- Class: Insecta
- Order: Lepidoptera
- Family: Gelechiidae
- Genus: Deltophora
- Species: D. flavocincta

Binomial name
- Deltophora flavocincta Sattler, 1979

Species of moth

Deltophora flavocincta is a moth of the family Gelechiidae. It is found in Mexico (Tamaulipas, Tabasco) and Colombia (Magdalena).

The length of the forewings is 5–6 mm. Adults have been recorded on wing in February and from June to August at altitudes between 300 and 600 meters.
