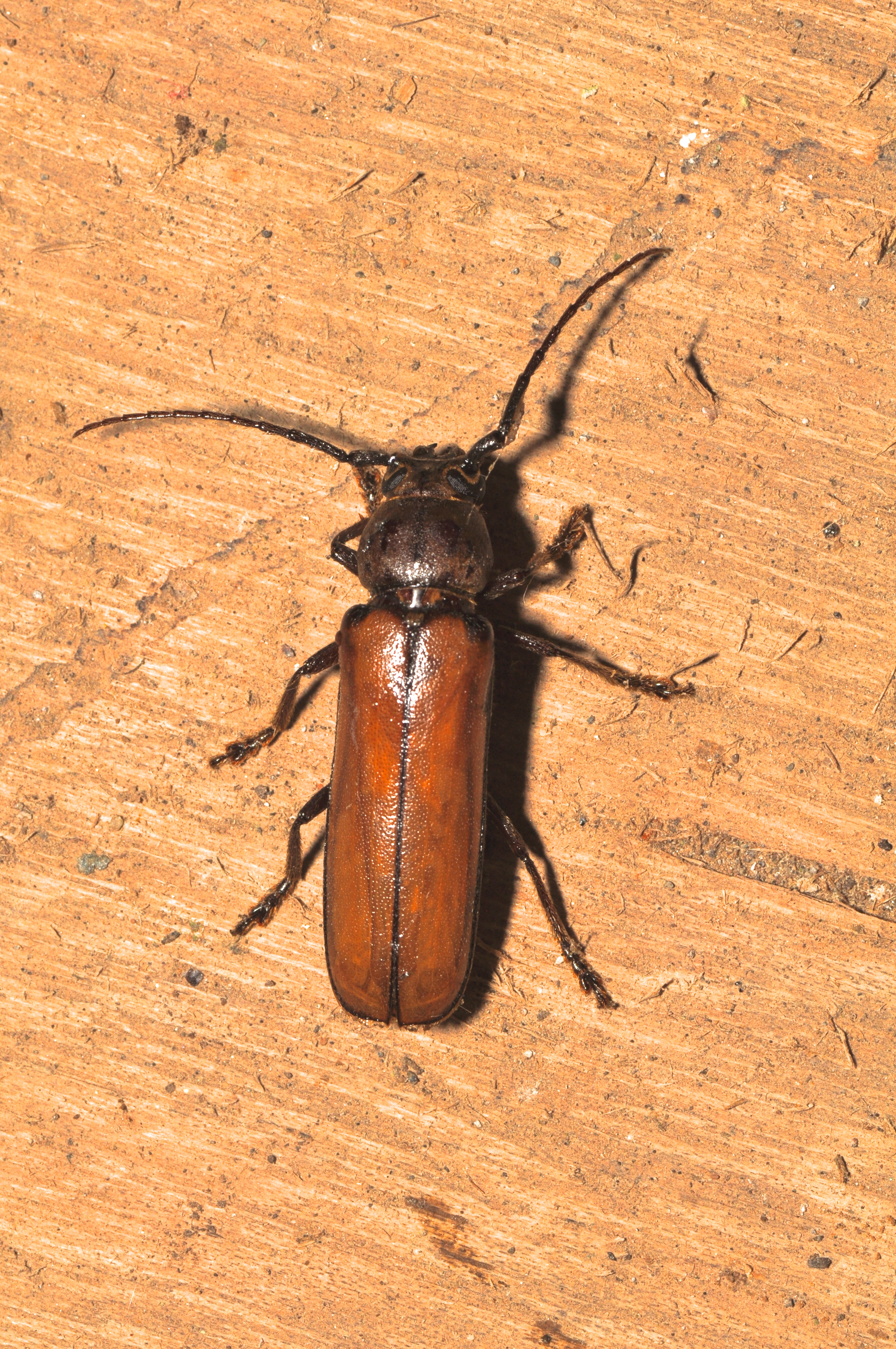

Scientific classification
- Kingdom: Animalia
- Phylum: Arthropoda
- Class: Insecta
- Order: Coleoptera
- Suborder: Polyphaga
- Infraorder: Cucujiformia
- Family: Cerambycidae
- Genus: Diploschema
- Species: D. weyrauchi

Binomial name
- Diploschema weyrauchi Lane, 1966

= Diploschema weyrauchi =

Species of beetle

Diploschema weyrauchi is a species of beetle in the family Cerambycidae. It was described by Lane in 1966.
