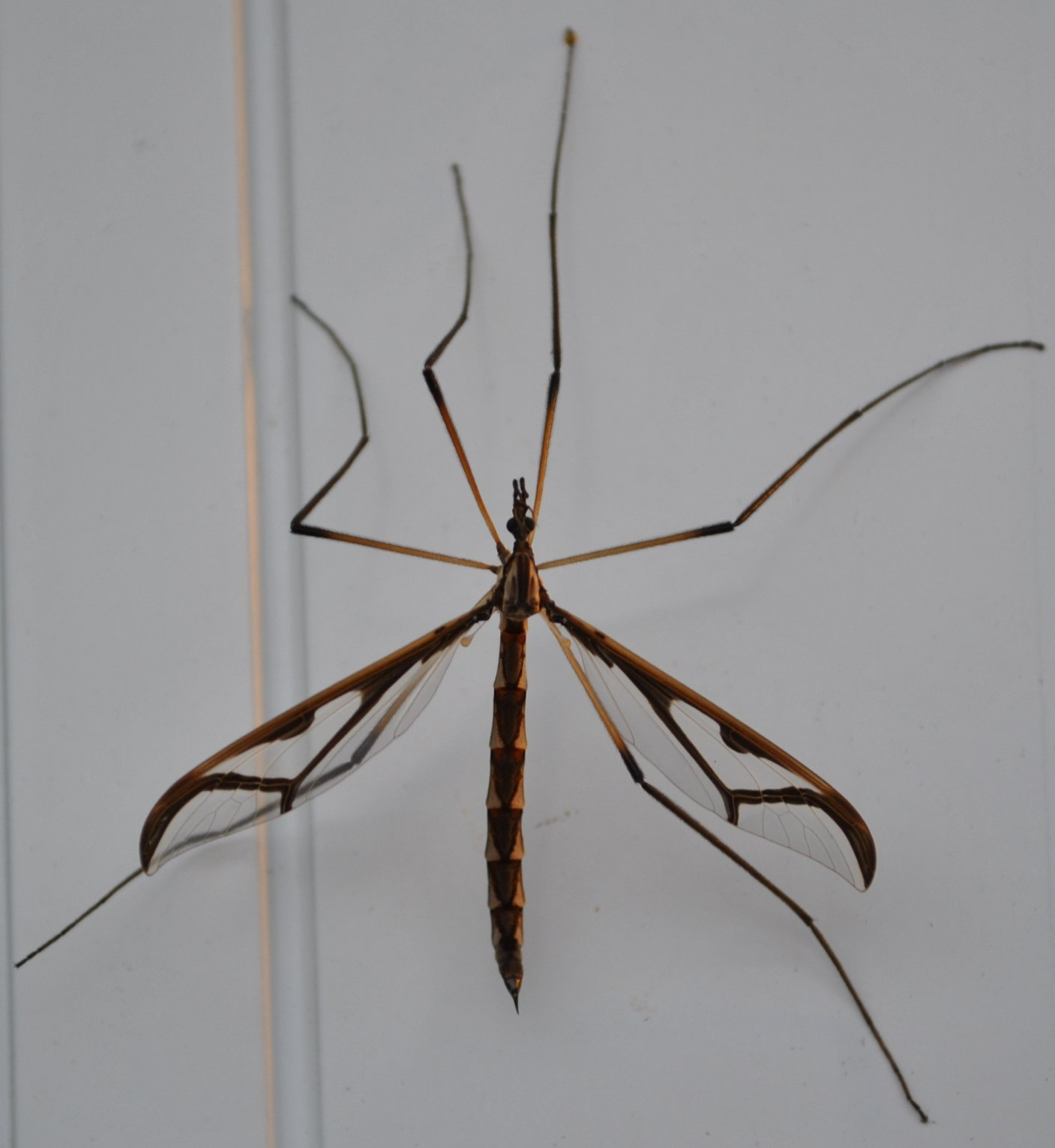

Scientific classification
- Kingdom: Animalia
- Phylum: Arthropoda
- Class: Insecta
- Order: Diptera
- Family: Pediciidae
- Genus: Pedicia
- Species: P. albivitta

Binomial name
- Pedicia albivitta Walker, 1848

= Pedicia albivitta =

Species of fly

Pedicia albivitta, the giant eastern crane fly, is a species of hairy-eyed crane fly in the family Pediciidae. It is extremely similar to Pedicia goldsworthyi and only males can be distinguished, with their genitalia.
