= Deltophora minuta =

Scientific classification
- Kingdom: Animalia
- Phylum: Arthropoda
- Class: Insecta
- Order: Lepidoptera
- Family: Gelechiidae
- Genus: Deltophora
- Species: D. minuta

Binomial name
- Deltophora minuta Sattler, 1979

Species of moth

Deltophora minuta is a moth of the family Gelechiidae. It is found in Brazil (Amazon).

The length of the forewings is 3.5–4 mm. Adults have been recorded on wing in August and September.
