= Deltophora fuscomaculata =

Scientific classification
- Domain: Eukaryota
- Kingdom: Animalia
- Phylum: Arthropoda
- Class: Insecta
- Order: Lepidoptera
- Family: Gelechiidae
- Genus: Deltophora
- Species: D. fuscomaculata

Binomial name
- Deltophora fuscomaculata Park, 1988

Species of moth

Deltophora fuscomaculata is a moth of the family Gelechiidae. It is found in Korea.
