= Deltophora angulella =

Scientific classification
- Kingdom: Animalia
- Phylum: Arthropoda
- Class: Insecta
- Order: Lepidoptera
- Family: Gelechiidae
- Genus: Deltophora
- Species: D. angulella

Binomial name
- Deltophora angulella Sattler, 1979

Species of moth

Deltophora angulella is a moth of the family Gelechiidae. It is found in Kenya.

The length of the forewings is about 7 mm. The forewings are grey-brown with dark brown markings. Adults have been recorded on wing from September to October.
