= Deltophora fasciella =

Scientific classification
- Kingdom: Animalia
- Phylum: Arthropoda
- Class: Insecta
- Order: Lepidoptera
- Family: Gelechiidae
- Genus: Deltophora
- Species: D. fasciella

Binomial name
- Deltophora fasciella Sattler, 1979

Species of moth

Deltophora fasciella is a moth of the family Gelechiidae. It is found in Israel, south-western Saudi Arabia, southern Iran, eastern Afghanistan and possibly Sudan.

The length of the forewings is 5–6.5 mm. Adults have been recorded on wing in April, May and November.
