= Diploschema howdeni =

Scientific classification
- Kingdom: Animalia
- Phylum: Arthropoda
- Class: Insecta
- Order: Coleoptera
- Suborder: Polyphaga
- Infraorder: Cucujiformia
- Family: Cerambycidae
- Genus: Diploschema
- Species: D. howdeni

Binomial name
- Diploschema howdeni Martins & Monné, 1980

Species of beetle

Diploschema howdeni is a species of beetle in the family Cerambycidae. It was described by Martins and Monné in 1980.
