= Deltophora distinctella =

Scientific classification
- Kingdom: Animalia
- Phylum: Arthropoda
- Class: Insecta
- Order: Lepidoptera
- Family: Gelechiidae
- Genus: Deltophora
- Species: D. distinctella

Binomial name
- Deltophora distinctella Sattler, 1979

Species of moth

Deltophora distinctella is a moth of the family Gelechiidae. It is found in India.

The length of the forewings is 5.5–6.5 mm. Adults have been recorded on wing from January to March and September to November.
