= Deltophora gielisia =

Scientific classification
- Domain: Eukaryota
- Kingdom: Animalia
- Phylum: Arthropoda
- Class: Insecta
- Order: Lepidoptera
- Family: Gelechiidae
- Genus: Deltophora
- Species: D. gielisia

Binomial name
- Deltophora gielisia Hull, 1995

Synonyms
- Deltophora gielsia

Species of moth

Deltophora gielisia is a moth of the family Gelechiidae. It is found in Spain and Portugal.
