= Deltophora quadrativalvata =

Scientific classification
- Kingdom: Animalia
- Phylum: Arthropoda
- Clade: Pancrustacea
- Class: Insecta
- Order: Lepidoptera
- Family: Gelechiidae
- Genus: Deltophora
- Species: D. quadrativalvata

Binomial name
- Deltophora quadrativalvata Li, Li & Wang, 2002

Species of moth

Deltophora quadrativalvata is a species of moth in the family Gelechiidae which is endemic to China. It is found in Hebei (Laiyuan, Jingxing, Neiqiu) and Henan (Dengfeng).
