= Savchenkoiana =

Scientific classification
- Kingdom: Animalia
- Phylum: Arthropoda
- Class: Insecta
- Order: Diptera
- Family: Pediciidae
- Subfamily: Pediciinae
- Genus: Savchenkoiana; Kocak, 1981

Type species
- Eugenia mokrzhitskae Savchenko, 1977

Species
- See text

Synonyms
- Eugenia Savchenko, 1977

Genus of flies

Savchenkoiana is a genus of hairy-eyed craneflies (family Pediciidae) from the Russian far east (Primorskiy kray).

== Species ==
- Savchenkoiana mokrzhitskae (Savchenko, 1977)
