= Deltophora stictella =

Scientific classification
- Domain: Eukaryota
- Kingdom: Animalia
- Phylum: Arthropoda
- Class: Insecta
- Order: Lepidoptera
- Family: Gelechiidae
- Genus: Deltophora
- Species: D. stictella

Binomial name
- Deltophora stictella (Rebel, 1927)

Synonyms
- Teleia stictella Rebel, 1927; Telphusa stictella; Teleiodes stictella

Species of moth

Deltophora stictella is a moth of the family Gelechiidae. It is found in Spain, southern France and Italy.

The length of the forewings is 6-7.5 mm. Adults have been recorded on wing from the last third of June to mid-August, at altitudes between 700 and 2,000 meters. There seems to be one generation per year.
