= Heterangaeus =

Scientific classification
- Kingdom: Animalia
- Phylum: Arthropoda
- Class: Insecta
- Order: Diptera
- Family: Pediciidae
- Subfamily: Pediciinae
- Genus: Heterangaeus; Alexander, 1925

Type species
- Polyangaeus gloriosus Alexander, 1924

Species
- See text

Genus of flies

Heterangaeus is a genus of hairy-eyed craneflies (family Pediciidae) from the Russian far east (Sakhalin & Kuril Islands), North Korea and Japan.

== Species ==
- Heterangaeus esakii Alexander, 1924
- Heterangaeus gloriosus (Alexander, 1924)
- Heterangaeus japonicus (Alexander, 1919)
- Heterangaeus laticinctus Alexander, 1931
- Heterangaeus pallidellus Alexander, 1933
- Heterangaeus spectabilis Alexander, 1924
