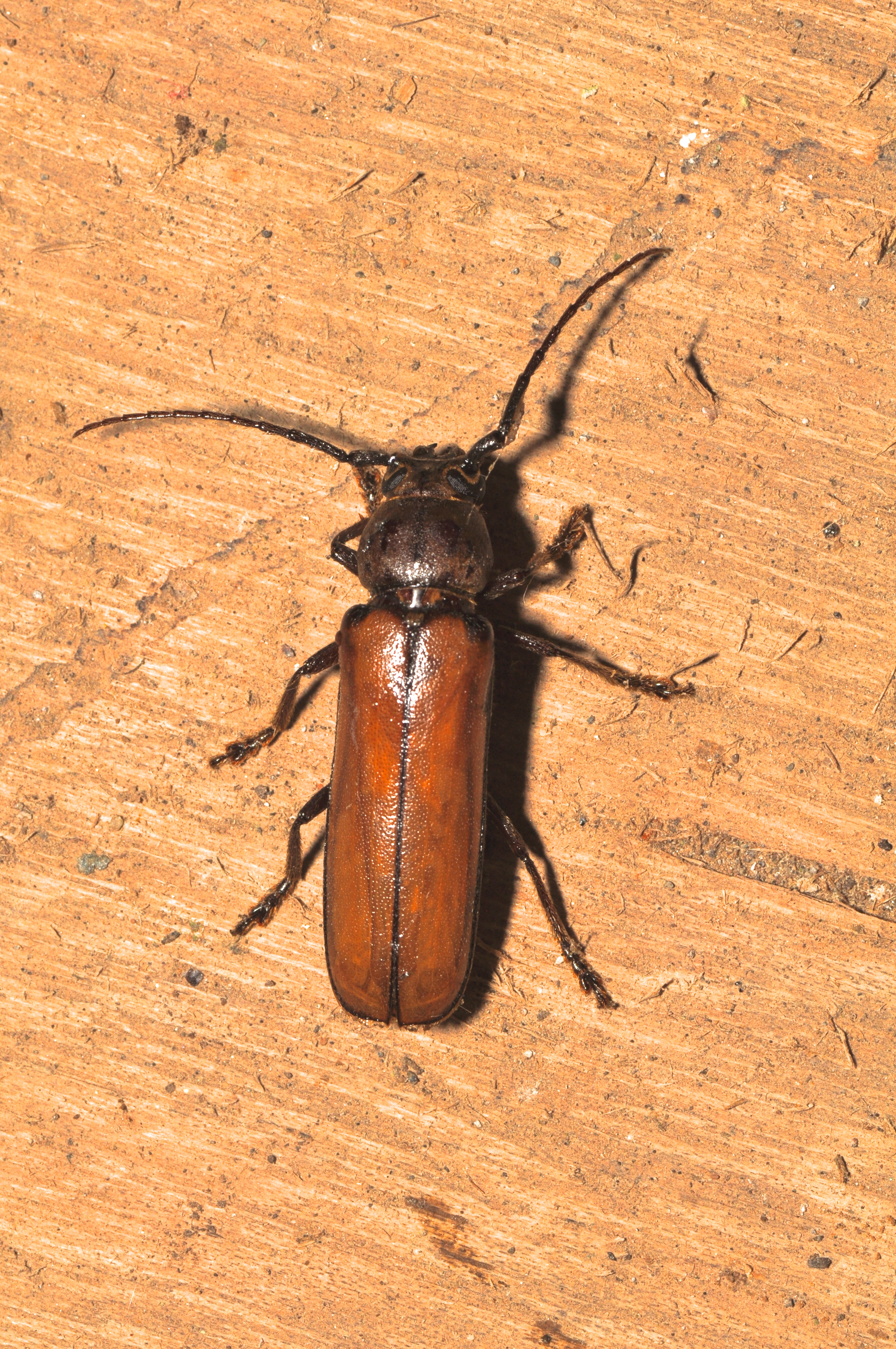
- Diploschema weyrauchi

Scientific classification
- Kingdom: Animalia
- Phylum: Arthropoda
- Class: Insecta
- Order: Coleoptera
- Suborder: Polyphaga
- Infraorder: Cucujiformia
- Family: Cerambycidae
- Subfamily: Cerambycinae
- Tribe: Torneutini
- Genus: Diploschema; Thomson, 1858

= Diploschema =

Genus of beetles

Diploschema is a genus of beetles in the family Cerambycidae, containing the following species:

- Diploschema brunnea Martins & Monné, 1980
- Diploschema howdeni Martins & Monné, 1980
- Diploschema maculata Martins & Monné, 1980
- Diploschema mandibulare Fuchs, 1964
- Diploschema rotundicolle (Audinet-Serville, 1834)
- Diploschema weyrauchi Lane, 1966
