= Malaisemyia =

Scientific classification
- Kingdom: Animalia
- Phylum: Arthropoda
- Class: Insecta
- Order: Diptera
- Family: Pediciidae
- Subfamily: Pediciinae
- Genus: Malaisemyia; Alexander, 1950

Type species
- Malaisemyia ornatissima Alexander, 1950

Species
- See text

Genus of flies

Malaisemyia is a genus of hairy-eyed craneflies (family Pediciidae) from Assam (India), with the exception of M. ornatissima from Myanmar.

== Species ==
- Malaisemyia manipurensis Alexander, 1964
- Malaisemyia ornatissima Alexander, 1950
- Malaisemyia rajah Alexander, 1967
- Malaisemyia ranee Alexander, 1967
- Malaisemyia schmidiana Alexander, 1967
