= Deltophora caymana =

Scientific classification
- Domain: Eukaryota
- Kingdom: Animalia
- Phylum: Arthropoda
- Class: Insecta
- Order: Lepidoptera
- Family: Gelechiidae
- Genus: Deltophora
- Species: D. caymana

Binomial name
- Deltophora caymana Sattler, 1979

Species of moth

Deltophora caymana is a moth of the family Gelechiidae. It is found on the Cayman Islands.

The length of the forewings is 3.5–4 mm. Adults have been recorded on wing in May and July.
