= Pedicia parvicellula =

Scientific classification
- Kingdom: Animalia
- Phylum: Arthropoda
- Class: Insecta
- Order: Diptera
- Family: Pediciidae
- Genus: Pedicia
- Species: P. parvicellula

Binomial name
- Pedicia parvicellula Alexander, 1938

Species of fly

Pedicia parvicellula is a species of hairy-eyed crane fly in the family Pediciidae.
