= Deltophora duplicata =

Scientific classification
- Kingdom: Animalia
- Phylum: Arthropoda
- Clade: Pancrustacea
- Class: Insecta
- Order: Lepidoptera
- Family: Gelechiidae
- Genus: Deltophora
- Species: D. duplicata

Binomial name
- Deltophora duplicata Sattler, 1979

Species of moth

Deltophora duplicata is a species of moth in the family Gelechiidae. It is found in the United States (Florida), the Cayman Islands, Mexico (Tamaulipas) and El Salvador.

The length of the forewings is 4.5-5.5 mm. Adults have been recorded on wing in February, May, July and August.
