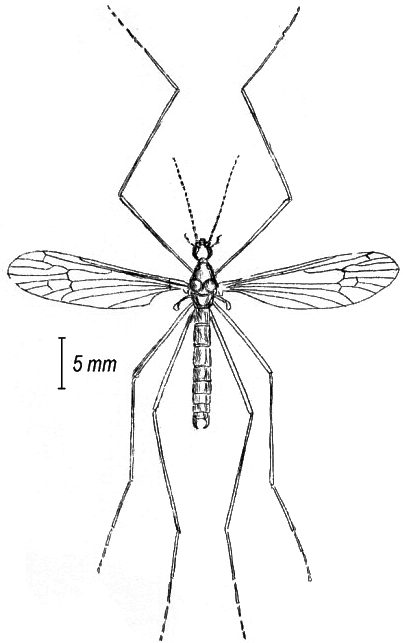
- Ula sylvatica

Scientific classification
- Kingdom: Animalia
- Phylum: Arthropoda
- Class: Insecta
- Order: Diptera
- Family: Pediciidae
- Subfamily: Ulinae
- Genus: Ula; Haliday, 1833

Type species
- Ula mollissima Haliday, 1833

Subgenera
- Ula Haliday, 1833; Metaula Alexander, 1950

Synonyms
- Goureautia Bigot, 1854; Macroptera Lioy, 1863; Rondania Bigot, 1854 (nec Robineau-Desvoidy, 1830)

= Ula (fly) =

Genus of flies

Ula is a genus of crane flies in the family Pediciidae.

== Species ==
Subgenus Metaula Alexander, 1950
Ula hians Alexander, 1965
Ula splendissima Alexander, 1950
Subgenus Ula Haliday, 1833

Ula auritarsis Alexander, 1932
Ula bidens Alexander, 1950
Ula bifilata Edwards, 1933
Ula bolitophila Loew, 1869
Ula cincta Alexander, 1924
Ula comes Alexander, 1935
Ula elegans Osten Sacken, 1869
Ula flavidibasis Alexander, 1930
Ula fulva Alexander, 1950
Ula fungicola Nobuchi, 1954
Ula fuscistigma Alexander, 1929
Ula javanica Alexander, 1915
Ula kiushiuensis Alexander, 1933
Ula longicellata Ishida, 1954
Ula malaisei Alexander, 1965
Ula mindanica Alexander, 1931
Ula mixta Stary, 1983
Ula mollissima Haliday, 1833
Ula parabidens Alexander, 1968
Ula provecta Alexander, 1936
Ula shiitakea Nobuchi, 1954
Ula subbidens Alexander, 1958
Ula succincta Alexander, 1933
Ula superelegans Alexander, 1929
Ula sylvatica (Meigen, 1818)
Ula unidens Alexander, 1968
