= Deltophora lanceella =

Scientific classification
- Kingdom: Animalia
- Phylum: Arthropoda
- Class: Insecta
- Order: Lepidoptera
- Family: Gelechiidae
- Genus: Deltophora
- Species: D. lanceella

Binomial name
- Deltophora lanceella Sattler, 1979

Species of moth

Deltophora lanceella is a moth of the family Gelechiidae. It is found in the West Indies (Grenada), Guyana and Brazil (Pará).

The length of the forewings is 5-5.5 mm. Adults have been recorded on wing in January and February.
