= Dicranota maculata =

Scientific classification
- Domain: Eukaryota
- Kingdom: Animalia
- Phylum: Arthropoda
- Class: Insecta
- Order: Diptera
- Family: Pediciidae
- Genus: Dicranota
- Species: D. maculata

Binomial name
- Dicranota maculata (Doane, 1900)

Synonyms
- Polyangaeus maculata Doane, 1900

Species of fly

Dicranota maculata is a species of hairy-eyed crane fly in the family Pediciidae.
