= Diploschema brunnea =

Scientific classification
- Kingdom: Animalia
- Phylum: Arthropoda
- Class: Insecta
- Order: Coleoptera
- Suborder: Polyphaga
- Infraorder: Cucujiformia
- Family: Cerambycidae
- Genus: Diploschema
- Species: D. brunnea

Binomial name
- Diploschema brunnea Martins & Monné, 1980

Species of beetle

Diploschema brunnea is a species of beetle in the family Cerambycidae. It was described by Martins and Monné in 1980.
