= Deltophora typica =

Scientific classification
- Domain: Eukaryota
- Kingdom: Animalia
- Phylum: Arthropoda
- Class: Insecta
- Order: Lepidoptera
- Family: Gelechiidae
- Genus: Deltophora
- Species: D. typica

Binomial name
- Deltophora typica Sattler, 1979

Species of moth

Deltophora typica is a moth of the family Gelechiidae. It is found in south-western Africa, South Africa, Zimbabwe and Mozambique.

The length of the forewings is 4.5-5.5 mm. In Nigeria, adults have only been collected in January and October.
