= Deltophora suffusella =

Scientific classification
- Kingdom: Animalia
- Phylum: Arthropoda
- Class: Insecta
- Order: Lepidoptera
- Family: Gelechiidae
- Genus: Deltophora
- Species: D. suffusella

Binomial name
- Deltophora suffusella Sattler, 1979

Species of moth

Deltophora suffusella is a moth of the family Gelechiidae. It is found in Paraguay (Chaco).

The length of the forewings is about 5 mm. Adults have been recorded on wing in October and November.
