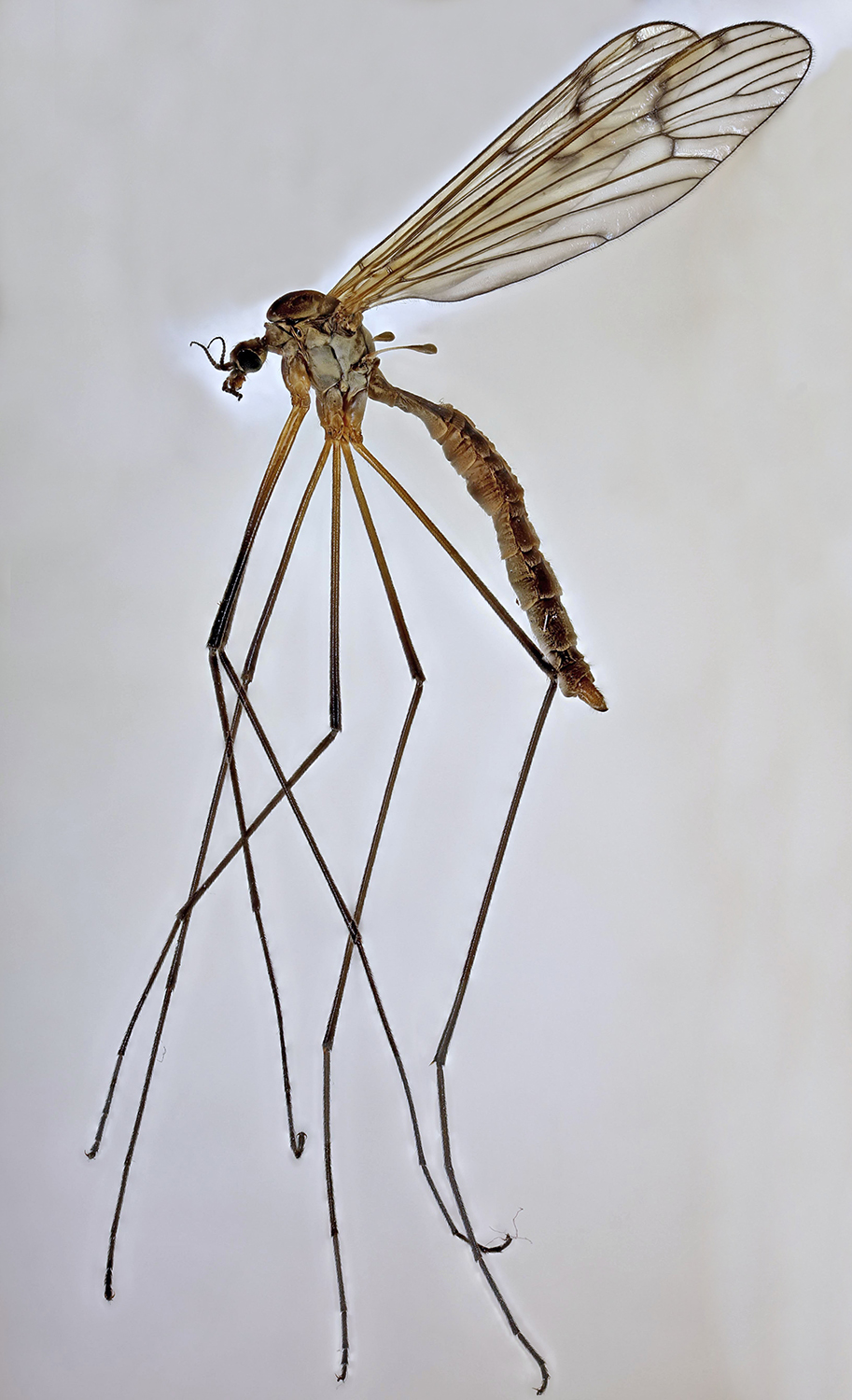
- Pedicia occulta North Wales

Scientific classification
- Kingdom: Animalia
- Phylum: Arthropoda
- Clade: Pancrustacea
- Class: Insecta
- Order: Diptera
- Family: Pediciidae
- Genus: Pedicia
- Species: P. occulta

Binomial name
- Pedicia occulta (Meigen, 1830)

= Pedicia occulta =

Species of fly

Pedicia occulta is a species of fly in the family Limoniidae. It is found in the Palearctic.
