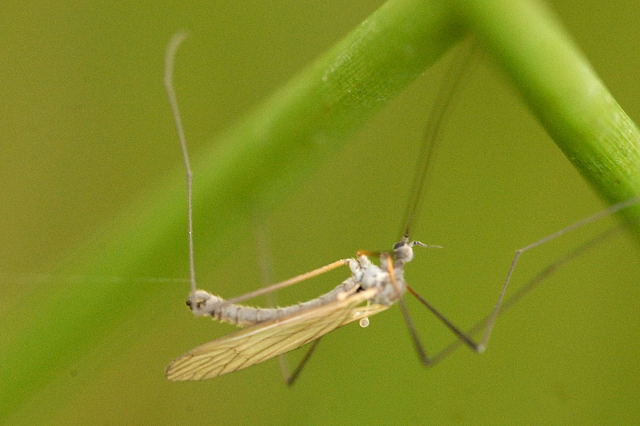
- Tricyphona unicolor

Scientific classification
- Domain: Eukaryota
- Kingdom: Animalia
- Phylum: Arthropoda
- Class: Insecta
- Order: Diptera
- Family: Pediciidae
- Subfamily: Pediciinae
- Genus: Tricyphona; Zetterstedt, 1838

Type species
- Limonia immaculata Meigen, 1804

Subgenera
- Eucyphona Alexander, 1950; Pentacyphona Alexander, 1968; Tricyphona Zetterstedt, 1837; Trifurcaria Lackschewitz, 1964

= Tricyphona =

Genus of flies

Tricyphona is a genus of crane flies in the family Pediciidae.

== Species ==
- Subgenus Eucyphona Alexander, 1950

- Tricyphona epione (Alexander, 1950)

- Subgenus Pentacyphona Alexander, 1968

- Tricyphona ampla (Doane, 1900)
- Tricyphona aspidoptera (Coquillett, 1905)
- Tricyphona autumnalis Alexander, 1917
- Tricyphona cinereicolor (Alexander, 1958)
- Tricyphona huffae (Alexander, 1940)
- Tricyphona smithae (Alexander, 1941)
- Tricyphona subaptera (Alexander, 1917)
- Tricyphona truncata (Alexander, 1941)

- Subgenus Tricyphona Zetterstedt, 1837

- Tricyphona acicularis (Alexander, 1945)
- Tricyphona aethiops (Alexander, 1955)
- Tricyphona ailinia (Alexander, 1965)
- Tricyphona albicentra (Alexander, 1962)
- Tricyphona alpigena (Strobl, 1910)
- Tricyphona alticola Strobl, 1910
- Tricyphona aperta Coquillett, 1905
- Tricyphona araucana (Alexander, 1971)
- Tricyphona arisana Alexander, 1924
- Tricyphona arthuriana Alexander, 1924
- Tricyphona auripennis (Osten Sacken, 1860)
- Tricyphona aysenensis (Alexander, 1944)
- Tricyphona bianchii (Alexander, 1966)
- Tricyphona bicollis (Alexander, 1967)
- Tricyphona bicomata (Alexander, 1943)
- Tricyphona bidentifera (Alexander, 1950)
- Tricyphona brevifurcata Alexander, 1919
- Tricyphona buetigeri (Alexander, 1960)
- Tricyphona calcar (Osten Sacken, 1860)
- Tricyphona cascadensis (Alexander, 1954)
- Tricyphona cervina Alexander, 1917
- Tricyphona chilota Alexander, 1929
- Tricyphona claggi Alexander, 1931
- Tricyphona confluens Alexander, 1922
- Tricyphona congrua (Walker, 1848)
- Tricyphona constans (Doane, 1900)
- Tricyphona contraria Bergroth, 1888
- Tricyphona crassipyga Alexander, 1928
- Tricyphona degenerata Alexander, 1917
- Tricyphona diaphanoides (Alexander, 1938)
- Tricyphona disphana (Doane, 1900)
- Tricyphona elegans (Brunetti, 1912)
- Tricyphona ericarum (Alexander, 1966)
- Tricyphona exoloma (Doane, 1900)
- Tricyphona fenderiana (Alexander, 1954)
- Tricyphona flavipennis (Brunetti, 1918)
- Tricyphona formosana Alexander, 1920
- Tricyphona frigida Alexander, 1919
- Tricyphona fulvicolor (Alexander, 1945)
- Tricyphona furcata Alexander, 1926
- Tricyphona fuscostigmata (Alexander, 1965)
- Tricyphona gigantea (Alexander, 1940)
- Tricyphona glabripennis (Brunetti, 1912)
- Tricyphona glacialis Alexander, 1917
- Tricyphona guttistigma (Alexander, 1941)
- Tricyphona hannai Alexander, 1923
- Tricyphona hynesiana (Alexander, 1961)
- Tricyphona immaculata (Meigen, 1804)
- Tricyphona inconstans (Osten Sacken, 1860)
- Tricyphona insulana Alexander, 1913
- Tricyphona johnsoni Alexander, 1930
- Tricyphona katahdin Alexander, 1914
- Tricyphona kehama (Alexander, 1969)
- Tricyphona kirishimensis Alexander, 1928
- Tricyphona livida Madarassy, 1881
- Tricyphona longiloba (Alexander, 1938)
- Tricyphona macateei Alexander, 1919
- Tricyphona macrophallus (Alexander, 1945)
- Tricyphona magra (Alexander, 1962)
- Tricyphona margipunctata (Alexander, 1953)
- Tricyphona megastigma (Alexander, 1967)
- Tricyphona nigritarsis (Skuse, 1890)
- Tricyphona nigrocuspis (Alexander, 1973)
- Tricyphona novaezelandiae Alexander, 1922
- Tricyphona omeiana (Alexander, 1938)
- Tricyphona optabilis Alexander, 1924
- Tricyphona orophila (Alexander, 1928)
- Tricyphona pahasapa (Alexander, 1958)
- Tricyphona paludicola Alexander, 1916
- Tricyphona pectinata Alexander, 1931
- Tricyphona penai (Alexander, 1953)
- Tricyphona perpallens (Alexander, 1957)
- Tricyphona perrecessa (Alexander, 1950)
- Tricyphona phaeostigma (Alexander, 1962)
- Tricyphona platyptera Alexander, 1929
- Tricyphona protea Alexander, 1918
- Tricyphona pumila (Alexander, 1943)
- Tricyphona rainieria Alexander, 1924
- Tricyphona rubiginosa Alexander, 1931
- Tricyphona sakkya (Alexander, 1962)
- Tricyphona schummeli Edwards, 1921
- Tricyphona septentrionalis Bergroth, 1888
- Tricyphona serrimarga (Alexander, 1944)
- Tricyphona shastensis (Alexander, 1958)
- Tricyphona simplicistyla Alexander, 1930
- Tricyphona tachulanica (Alexander, 1949)
- Tricyphona tacoma (Alexander, 1949)
- Tricyphona townesiana (Alexander, 1942)
- Tricyphona unicolor (Schummel, 1829)
- Tricyphona unigera (Alexander, 1949)
- Tricyphona ussurica (Alexander, 1934)
- Tricyphona vernalis (Osten Sacken, 1861)
- Tricyphona xanthoptera (Alexander, 1966)
- Tricyphona yakushimana Alexander, 1930
- Tricyphona zwicki Mendl, 1973

- Subgenus Trifurcaria Lackschewitz, 1964

- Tricyphona arctica (Lackschewitz, 1964)
