= Deltophora digitiformis =

Scientific classification
- Kingdom: Animalia
- Phylum: Arthropoda
- Clade: Pancrustacea
- Class: Insecta
- Order: Lepidoptera
- Family: Gelechiidae
- Genus: Deltophora
- Species: D. digitiformis

Binomial name
- Deltophora digitiformis Li, Li & Wang, 2002

Species of moth

Deltophora digitiformis is a moth of the family Gelechiidae that is endemic to China.
