= Diploschema rotundicolle =

Scientific classification
- Kingdom: Animalia
- Phylum: Arthropoda
- Class: Insecta
- Order: Coleoptera
- Suborder: Polyphaga
- Infraorder: Cucujiformia
- Family: Cerambycidae
- Genus: Diploschema
- Species: D. rotundicolle

Binomial name
- Diploschema rotundicolle (Audinet-Serville, 1834)

Species of beetle

Diploschema rotundicolle, citrus stem borer is a species of beetle in the family Cerambycidae. It was described by Audinet-Serville in 1834. The species is known for feeding on oranges in Brazil.
