= Ornithodes =

Scientific classification
- Kingdom: Animalia
- Phylum: Arthropoda
- Class: Insecta
- Order: Diptera
- Family: Pediciidae
- Subfamily: Pediciinae
- Genus: Ornithodes; Coquillett, 1900

Type species
- Ornithodes harrimani Coquillett, 1900

Species
- See text

Genus of flies

Ornithodes is a genus of hairy-eyed craneflies (family Pediciidae). Both known species are from North America:

- Ornithodes brevirostris Alexander, 1955
- Ornithodes harrimani Coquillett, 1900
