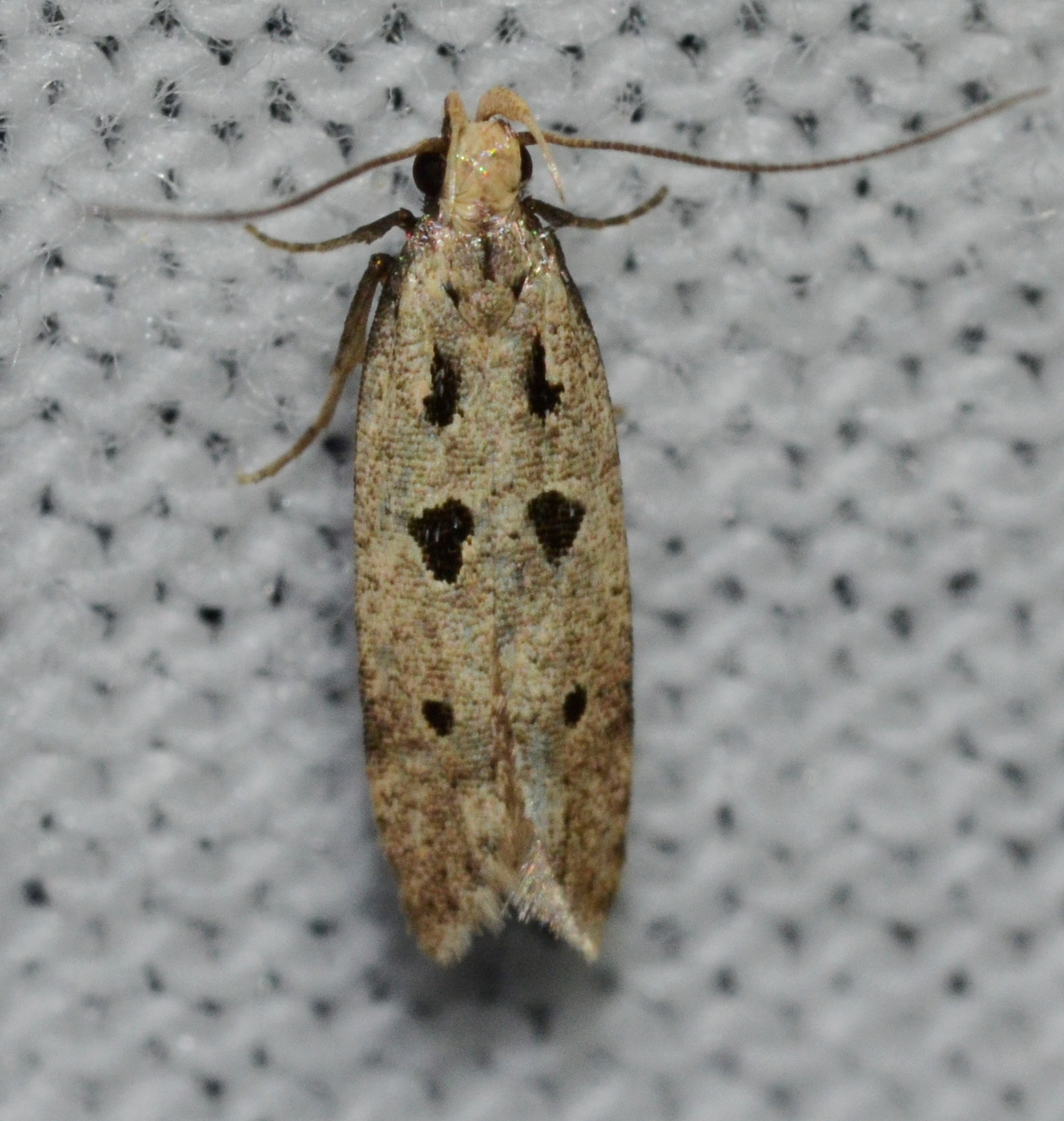
- Deltophora sella

Scientific classification
- Kingdom: Animalia
- Phylum: Arthropoda
- Class: Insecta
- Order: Lepidoptera
- Family: Gelechiidae
- Subfamily: Anomologinae
- Tribe: Anomologini
- Genus: Deltophora; Janse, 1950

= Deltophora =

Genus of moths

Deltophora is a genus of moths in the family Gelechiidae. The genus was originally described from South Africa and based on a taxonomic revision contains about 20 species on all continents except Antarctica. Host plants of larvae and adults are only known for two Chinese species of Deltophora.

== Species ==
- peltosema species-group
  - Deltophora angulella Sattler, 1979
  - Deltophora distinctella Sattler, 1979
  - Deltophora diversella Sattler, 1979
  - Deltophora fasciella Sattler, 1979
  - Deltophora peltosema (Lower, 1900)
  - Deltophora typica Sattler, 1979
- maculata species-group
  - Deltophora beatrix Sattler, 1979
  - Deltophora maculata (Staudinger, 1879)
  - Deltophora pauperella Sattler, 1979
- stictella species-group
  - Deltophora stictella (Rebel, 1927)
- korbi species-group
  - Deltophora korbi (Caradja, 1920)
- glandiferella species-group
  - Deltophora glandiferella (Zeller, 1873)
  - Deltophora sella (Chambers, 1874)
- flavocincta species-group
  - Deltophora caymana Sattler, 1979
  - Deltophora duplicata Sattler, 1979
  - Deltophora flavocincta Sattler, 1979
  - Deltophora lanceella Sattler, 1979
  - Deltophora minuta Sattler, 1979
  - Deltophora suffusella Sattler, 1979
- unknown species-group
  - Deltophora digitiformis Li, Li & Wang, 2002
  - Deltophora fuscomaculata Park, 1988
  - Deltophora gielisia Hull, 1995
  - Deltophora quadrativalvata Li, Li & Wang, 2002

== Former species ==
- Deltophora abrupta Omelko, 1995 is Epichostis abrupta (Omelko, 1995)
