= Deltophora glandiferella =

Scientific classification
- Kingdom: Animalia
- Phylum: Arthropoda
- Clade: Pancrustacea
- Class: Insecta
- Order: Lepidoptera
- Family: Gelechiidae
- Genus: Deltophora
- Species: D. glandiferella

Binomial name
- Deltophora glandiferella (Zeller, 1873)

Synonyms
- Gelechia (Anacampsis) glandiferella Zeller, 1873; Gelechia glandifuella; Gelechia glandifera; Telphusa glandiferella

Species of moth

Deltophora glandiferella is a moth of the family Gelechiidae. It is found in the United States (Texas) and Mexico (Coahuila, Nuevo León, Tamaulipas).

The length of the forewings is 5–7 mm. Adults have been recorded on wing from April to August and in October.
