= Pedicia procteriana =

Scientific classification
- Kingdom: Animalia
- Phylum: Arthropoda
- Class: Insecta
- Order: Diptera
- Family: Pediciidae
- Genus: Pedicia
- Species: P. procteriana

Binomial name
- Pedicia procteriana Alexander, 1939

Species of fly

Pedicia procteriana is a species of hairy-eyed crane fly in the family Pediciidae.
