= Deltophora korbi =

Scientific classification
- Kingdom: Animalia
- Phylum: Arthropoda
- Class: Insecta
- Order: Lepidoptera
- Family: Gelechiidae
- Genus: Deltophora
- Species: D. korbi

Binomial name
- Deltophora korbi (Caradja, 1920)

Synonyms
- Teleia korbi Caradja, 1920; Aristotelia korbi

Species of moth

Deltophora korbi is a moth of the family Gelechiidae. It is found in the Russian Far East and China.

The length of the forewings is about 5.5 mm.
