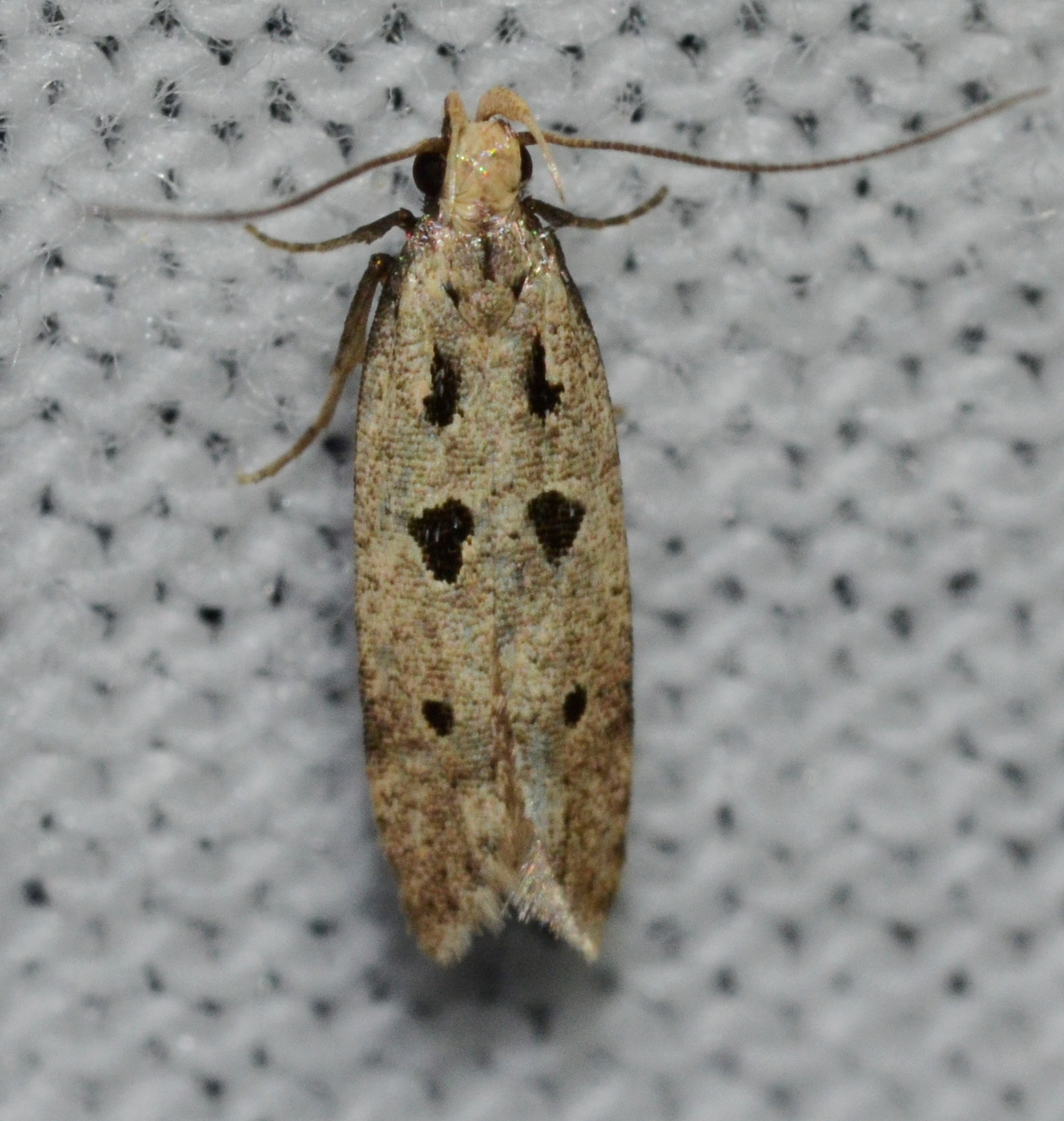

Scientific classification
- Kingdom: Animalia
- Phylum: Arthropoda
- Clade: Pancrustacea
- Class: Insecta
- Order: Lepidoptera
- Family: Gelechiidae
- Genus: Deltophora
- Species: D. sella

Binomial name
- Deltophora sella (Chambers, 1874)

Synonyms
- Gelechia sella Chambers, 1874; Aristotelia atacta Meyrick, 1927

= Deltophora sella =

Species of moth

Deltophora sella is a moth of the family Gelechiidae. It is found in the United States (North Carolina, Florida, Arkansas, Texas and California).

The length of the forewings is 5–7 mm. Adults have been recorded on wing from March to September and in November.

== Subspecies ==
- Deltophora sella sella (North Carolina, Florida, Arkansas, Texas)
- Deltophora sella atacta (Meyrick, 1927) (south-western Texas)
- Deltophora sella californica Sattler, 1979 (California)
