= Deltophora beatrix =

Scientific classification
- Kingdom: Animalia
- Phylum: Arthropoda
- Class: Insecta
- Order: Lepidoptera
- Family: Gelechiidae
- Genus: Deltophora
- Species: D. beatrix

Binomial name
- Deltophora beatrix Sattler, 1979

Species of moth

Deltophora beatrix is a moth of the family Gelechiidae. It is found in southern Iran.

The length of the forewings is about 6 mm. The forewings are cream, with black markings. Adults have been recorded on wing in early May.
