= Deltophora peltosema =

Scientific classification
- Domain: Eukaryota
- Kingdom: Animalia
- Phylum: Arthropoda
- Class: Insecta
- Order: Lepidoptera
- Family: Gelechiidae
- Genus: Deltophora
- Species: D. peltosema

Binomial name
- Deltophora peltosema (Lower, 1900)

Synonyms
- Xenolechia peltosema Lower, 1900; Aristotelia peltosema; Gelechia pyramidophora Turner, 1919

Species of moth

Deltophora peltosema is a moth of the family Gelechiidae. It is found in India, Sri Lanka and Australia (Western Australia, Queensland and New South Wales). Records from South Africa and South America are based on misidentifications.

This species was first described by Oswald Bertram Lower in 1900 as Xenolechia peltosema.

The length of the forewings is 5-5.5 mm. Adults have been recorded on wing from September to April.
