= Deltophora diversella =

Scientific classification
- Kingdom: Animalia
- Phylum: Arthropoda
- Class: Insecta
- Order: Lepidoptera
- Family: Gelechiidae
- Genus: Deltophora
- Species: D. diversella

Binomial name
- Deltophora diversella Sattler, 1979

Species of moth

Deltophora diversella is a moth of the family Gelechiidae. It is found in South Africa, southern Mozambique, Kenya, and Uganda.
