= Nipponomyia =

Scientific classification
- Kingdom: Animalia
- Phylum: Arthropoda
- Class: Insecta
- Order: Diptera
- Family: Pediciidae
- Subfamily: Pediciinae
- Genus: Nipponomyia; Alexander, 1924

Type species
- Tricyphona kuwanai Alexander, 1913

Species
- See text

Genus of flies

Nipponomyia is a genus of hairy-eyed craneflies (family Pediciidae).

== Distribution ==
All are from Asia. Most, but not all species are Oriental.

== Species ==
- Nipponomyia flavicollis Edwards, 1933
- Nipponomyia gracilis Savchenko, 1983
- Nipponomyia joshii Alexander, 1957
- Nipponomyia kamengensis Alexander, 1967
- Nipponomyia khasiana Alexander, 1936
- Nipponomyia kulingensis Alexander, 1937
- Nipponomyia kuwanai (Alexander, 1913)
- Nipponomyia mannheimsiana Alexander, 1969
- Nipponomyia nigrocorporis Alexander, 1944
- Nipponomyia novempunctata (Senior-White, 1922)
- Nipponomyia pentacantha Alexander, 1958
- Nipponomyia sumatrana (de Meijere, 1924)
- Nipponomyia symphyletes (Alexander, 1923)
- Nipponomyia szechwanensis Alexander, 1935
- Nipponomyia trispinosa (Alexander, 1920)
