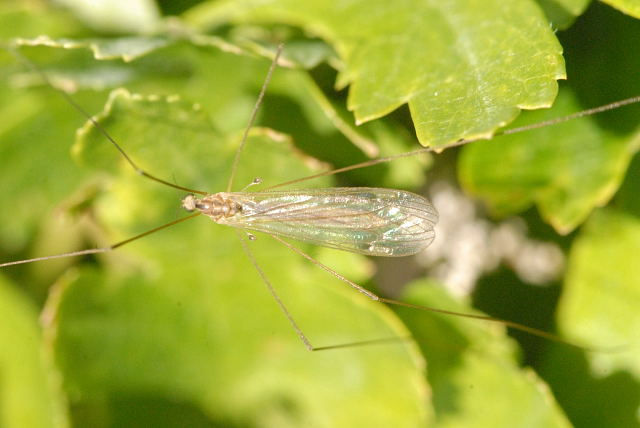
- Dicranota claripennis

Scientific classification
- Domain: Eukaryota
- Kingdom: Animalia
- Phylum: Arthropoda
- Class: Insecta
- Order: Diptera
- Family: Pediciidae
- Subfamily: Pediciinae
- Genus: Dicranota; Zetterstedt, 1838

Type species
- Dicranota guerini Zetterstedt, 1838

Subgenera
- Amalopina Brunetti, 1912; Amalopinodes Alexander, 1950; Dicranota Zetterstedt, 1838; Euamalopina Alexander, 1950; Eudicranota Alexander, 1934; Ludicia Hudson & Vane-Wright, 1969; Paradicranota Alexander, 1934; Plectromyia Osten Sacken, 1869; Polyangaeus Doane, 1900; Rhaphidolabina Alexander, 1916; Rhaphidolabis Osten Sacken, 1869

= Dicranota =

Genus of flies

Dicranota is a genus of flies in the family Pediciidae.

== Species ==
- Subgenus Amalopina Brunetti, 1912
  - Dicranota delectata Alexander, 1930
  - Dicranota elegantula (Brunetti, 1912)
  - Dicranota fumicostata Alexander, 1935
  - Dicranota hyalipennis Alexander, 1938
  - Dicranota megaplagiata Alexander, 1933
  - Dicranota melanoleuca Alexander, 1965
- Subgenus Amalopinodes Alexander, 1950
  - Dicranota phantasma Alexander, 1950
- Subgenus Dicranota Zetterstedt, 1838
  - Dicranota amatrix Alexander, 1965
  - Dicranota argentea Doane, 1900
  - Dicranota astigma Alexander, 1954
  - Dicranota bernardinensis Alexander, 1966
  - Dicranota bicornigera Savchenko, 1978
  - Dicranota bimaculata (Schummel, 1829)
  - Dicranota caesia Alexander, 1933
  - Dicranota clementi Alexander, 1956
  - Dicranota cosymbacantha Alexander, 1963
  - Dicranota crassicauda Tjeder, 1972
  - Dicranota currani Alexander, 1926
  - Dicranota diacantha Alexander, 1968
  - Dicranota divaricata Alexander, 1925
  - Dicranota fastuosa Alexander, 1963
  - Dicranota fumipennis Alexander, 1941
  - Dicranota garhwalensis Alexander, 1960
  - Dicranota guerini Zetterstedt, 1838
  - Dicranota impotens Alexander, 1963
  - Dicranota irregularis Pierre, 1922
  - Dicranota longisector Alexander, 1960
  - Dicranota mannheimsi Savchenko, 1972
  - Dicranota nippoalpina Alexander, 1933
  - Dicranota nipponica Alexander, 1919
  - Dicranota notmani Alexander, 1943
  - Dicranota noveboracensis Alexander, 1914
  - Dicranota nubecula Alexander, 1933
  - Dicranota parvella Alexander, 1954
  - Dicranota polaris (Riedel, 1919)
  - Dicranota quadrihamata Savchenko, 1977
  - Dicranota rainierensis Alexander, 1968
  - Dicranota retrorsa Savchenko, 1972
  - Dicranota sicaria Alexander, 1947
  - Dicranota stainsi Alexander, 1948
  - Dicranota strepens Alexander, 1960
  - Dicranota tetonicola Alexander, 1945
  - Dicranota yezoensis Alexander, 1924
- Subgenus Euamalopina Alexander, 1950
  - Dicranota perelegantula Alexander, 1950
- Subgenus Eudicranota Alexander, 1934
  - Dicranota catawbiensis Alexander, 1940
  - Dicranota circipunctata Alexander, 1949
  - Dicranota dicranotoides (Alexander, 1924)
  - Dicranota dione Alexander, 1957
  - Dicranota notabilis Alexander, 1929
  - Dicranota pallida Alexander, 1914
  - Dicranota pallidipes Alexander, 1933
  - Dicranota perdistincta Alexander, 1940
  - Dicranota radialis Alexander, 1941
  - Dicranota sibirica (Alexander, 1925)
  - Dicranota simplex Alexander, 1938
  - Dicranota tigriventris Alexander, 1967
  - Dicranota yonahlossee Alexander, 1941
- Subgenus Ludicia Hudson & Vane-Wright, 1969
  - Dicranota aberrans Savchenko, 1980
  - Dicranota asignata Alexander, 1964
  - Dicranota claripennis (Verrall, 1888)
  - Dicranota clausa Alexander, 1938
  - Dicranota emarginata (Alexander, 1945)
  - Dicranota iranensis (Alexander, 1975)
  - Dicranota lucidipennis (Edwards, 1921)
  - Dicranota megomma Alexander, 1962
  - Dicranota metaspectralis Alexander, 1965
  - Dicranota niphas Alexander, 1962
  - Dicranota paraspectralis Alexander, 1964
  - Dicranota perpallida Alexander, 1965
  - Dicranota reticularis Alexander, 1960
  - Dicranota spectralis (Brunetti, 1918)
  - Dicranota subreticularis Alexander, 1964
  - Dicranota subspectralis Alexander, 1960
  - Dicranota trichoneura Alexander, 1960
  - Dicranota trifurcata (Edwards, 1928)
- Subgenus Paradicranota Alexander, 1934
  - Dicranota auripontium Stary & Krzeminski, 1993
  - Dicranota brevicornis Bergroth, 1891
  - Dicranota brevitarsis Bergroth, 1891
  - Dicranota candelisequa Stary, 1981
  - Dicranota capillata Lackschewitz, 1940
  - Dicranota carbo Stary, 1998
  - Dicranota cinerascens Lackschewitz, 1940
  - Dicranota concavista Savchenko, 1977
  - Dicranota consimilis Mendl, 1987
  - Dicranota eucera Osten Sacken, 1869
  - Dicranota flammatra Stary, 1981
  - Dicranota fuscipennis Lackschewitz, 1940
  - Dicranota gracilipes Wahlgren, 1905
  - Dicranota hirtitergata Savchenko, 1979
  - Dicranota iowa Alexander, 1920
  - Dicranota lackschewitziana Mendl, 1988
  - Dicranota landrocki Czizek, 1931
  - Dicranota martinovskyi Stary, 1974
  - Dicranota mikiana Lackschewitz, 1940
  - Dicranota minuta Lackschewitz, 1940
  - Dicranota ophidia Alexander, 1975
  - Dicranota pallens Lackschewitz, 1940
  - Dicranota parviuncinata Savchenko, 1983
  - Dicranota pavida (Haliday, 1833)
  - Dicranota pretiosa Alexander, 1963
  - Dicranota reitteri Mik, 1882
  - Dicranota rivularis Osten Sacken, 1860
  - Dicranota robusta Lundstrom, 1912
  - Dicranota rorida Lackschewitz, 1940
  - Dicranota rostrata Mendl, 1987
  - Dicranota schistacea Lackschewitz, 1940
  - Dicranota simulans Lackschewitz, 1940
  - Dicranota spiralis Savchenko, 1980
  - Dicranota subflammatra Stary, 1998
  - Dicranota subtilis Loew, 1871
- Subgenus Plectromyia Osten Sacken, 1869
  - Dicranota acuminata Mendl, 1972
  - Dicranota cascadica Alexander, 1949
  - Dicranota confusa (Alexander, 1924)
  - Dicranota engelmannia Alexander, 1943
  - Dicranota incompleta (Brunetti, 1912)
  - Dicranota kulshanensis Alexander, 1949
  - Dicranota lassenensis Alexander, 1964
  - Dicranota modesta (Osten Sacken, 1869)
  - Dicranota nooksackiae Alexander, 1949
  - Dicranota petiolata (Alexander, 1919)
  - Dicranota reducta (Alexander, 1921)
  - Dicranota tergata (Alexander, 1926)
  - Dicranota townesi Alexander, 1940
- Subgenus Polyangaeus Doane, 1900
  - Dicranota maculata (Doane, 1900)
  - Dicranota megalops Alexander, 1945
  - Dicranota subapterogyne (Alexander, 1943)
- Subgenus Rhaphidolabina Alexander, 1916
  - Dicranota flaveola (Osten Sacken, 1869)
- Subgenus Rhaphidolabis Osten Sacken, 1869
  - Dicranota akshobya Alexander, 1963
  - Dicranota angulata Alexander, 1936
  - Dicranota angustistyla Alexander, 1940
  - Dicranota arjuna Alexander, 1964
  - Dicranota atripes (Alexander, 1928)
  - Dicranota avis (Alexander, 1926)
  - Dicranota babai Alexander, 1958
  - Dicranota balarama Alexander, 1961
  - Dicranota basistylata Alexander, 1958
  - Dicranota biloba Alexander, 1936
  - Dicranota brachyneura Alexander, 1960
  - Dicranota brunettii (Edwards, 1916)
  - Dicranota cayuga (Alexander, 1916)
  - Dicranota cazieriana Alexander, 1944
  - Dicranota chorisa Alexander, 1967
  - Dicranota commutata Savchenko, 1976
  - Dicranota complicata Savchenko, 1979
  - Dicranota consors (Alexander, 1923)
  - Dicranota denningi Alexander, 1966
  - Dicranota diprion Alexander, 1964
  - Dicranota exclusa (Walker, 1848)
  - Dicranota fascipennis (Brunetti, 1911)
  - Dicranota fenderi Alexander, 1954
  - Dicranota ferruginea Savchenko, 1983
  - Dicranota festa Alexander, 1966
  - Dicranota flavibasis (Alexander, 1919)
  - Dicranota forceps (Alexander, 1924)
  - Dicranota furcistyla Alexander, 1954
  - Dicranota gibbera (Alexander, 1921)
  - Dicranota hickmanae Alexander, 1940
  - Dicranota hoplomera Alexander, 1960
  - Dicranota idiopyga Alexander, 1953
  - Dicranota indica (Brunetti, 1912)
  - Dicranota indra Alexander, 1961
  - Dicranota integriloba Alexander, 1943
  - Dicranota kaliya Alexander, 1963
  - Dicranota khumyarae Alexander, 1960
  - Dicranota lacteipennis Alexander, 1961
  - Dicranota laticollis Alexander, 1968
  - Dicranota luteibasis Alexander, 1966
  - Dicranota luteola Alexander, 1938
  - Dicranota macracantha Alexander, 1947
  - Dicranota major (Alexander, 1917)
  - Dicranota mesasiatica Savchenko, 1973
  - Dicranota mexicana Alexander, 1946
  - Dicranota neoconsors Alexander, 1938
  - Dicranota neomexicana (Alexander, 1912)
  - Dicranota nooksackensis Alexander, 1949
  - Dicranota nuptialis Alexander, 1948
  - Dicranota obesistyla Alexander, 1960
  - Dicranota ompoana Alexander, 1945
  - Dicranota ontakensis Alexander, 1947
  - Dicranota pallidithorax Alexander, 1935
  - Dicranota paraconsors Alexander, 1955
  - Dicranota perlongiseta Alexander, 1966
  - Dicranota perproducta Alexander, 1965
  - Dicranota persessilis Alexander, 1954
  - Dicranota persimilis (Alexander, 1920)
  - Dicranota plana Alexander, 1934
  - Dicranota platymera Alexander, 1934
  - Dicranota polymera Alexander, 1933
  - Dicranota polymeroides (Alexander, 1914)
  - Dicranota praecisa Alexander, 1938
  - Dicranota princeps Alexander, 1950
  - Dicranota pristis Alexander, 1964
  - Dicranota profunda Alexander, 1950
  - Dicranota punctipennis (Edwards, 1928)
  - Dicranota querula Alexander, 1944
  - Dicranota rhododendri Alexander, 1966
  - Dicranota rogersiana (Alexander, 1925)
  - Dicranota rostrifera Alexander, 1946
  - Dicranota rubescens (Alexander, 1916)
  - Dicranota sanctaeluciae Alexander, 1964
  - Dicranota separata Alexander, 1969
  - Dicranota serrulifera Alexander, 1950
  - Dicranota sessilis (Alexander, 1917)
  - Dicranota setulifera Alexander, 1950
  - Dicranota shushna Alexander, 1961
  - Dicranota sinoalpina Alexander, 1933
  - Dicranota sordida (Brunetti, 1911)
  - Dicranota spina Alexander, 1933
  - Dicranota squarrosa Savchenko, 1976
  - Dicranota stenomera Alexander, 1966
  - Dicranota stenostyla Alexander, 1963
  - Dicranota stigma (Alexander, 1924)
  - Dicranota subconsors (Alexander, 1924)
  - Dicranota subsessilis (Alexander, 1921)
  - Dicranota subsordida Alexander, 1935
  - Dicranota subtumidosa Alexander, 1968
  - Dicranota tashepa Alexander, 1966
  - Dicranota tehama Alexander, 1950
  - Dicranota tenuipes (Osten Sacken, 1869)
  - Dicranota trichopyga Alexander, 1966
  - Dicranota trilobulata Alexander, 1958
  - Dicranota tuberculata Alexander, 1936
  - Dicranota tumidosa Alexander, 1960
  - Dicranota unilobata Alexander, 1964
  - Dicranota uninebulosa Alexander, 1935
  - Dicranota uniplagia Alexander, 1954
  - Dicranota vajra Alexander, 1961
  - Dicranota vanduzeei (Alexander, 1930)
  - Dicranota vishnu Alexander, 1963
  - Dicranota vritra Alexander, 1961
  - Dicranota xanthosoma Alexander, 1944
  - Dicranota yanoana Alexander, 1958
