= Deltophora maculata =

Scientific classification
- Kingdom: Animalia
- Phylum: Arthropoda
- Clade: Pancrustacea
- Class: Insecta
- Order: Lepidoptera
- Family: Gelechiidae
- Genus: Deltophora
- Species: D. maculata

Binomial name
- Deltophora maculata (Staudinger, 1879)

Synonyms
- Teleia maculata Staudinger, 1879; Gelechia maculata; Aristotelia maculata

Species of moth

Deltophora maculata is a moth of the family Gelechiidae. It is found in Georgia, Turkey, Armenia, Azerbaijan, Turkmenistan, Syria, Lebanon, Israel, Iran, Afghanistan and Greece, as well as on Crete and Cyprus. It has also been recorded from Saudi Arabia, but this is based on a misidentification.

The length of the forewings is 5–7 mm. Adults have been recorded on wing from April to September and in November.
