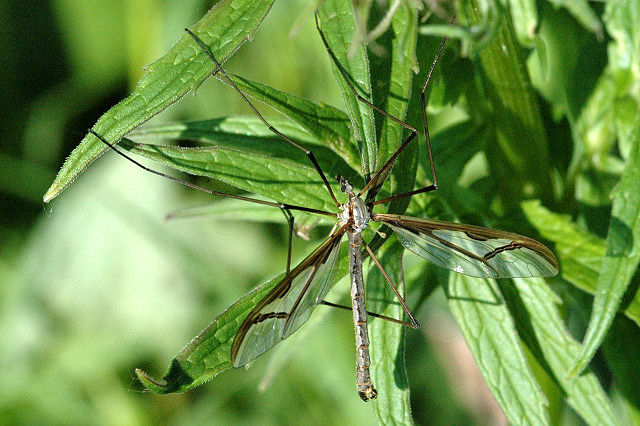

Scientific classification
- Kingdom: Animalia
- Phylum: Arthropoda
- Class: Insecta
- Order: Diptera
- Family: Pediciidae
- Genus: Pedicia
- Species: P. rivosa

Binomial name
- Pedicia rivosa (Linnaeus, 1758)

Subspecies
- P. r. mannheimsi Lindner, 1966; P. r. rivosa (Linnaeus, 1758)

Synonyms
- Tipula rivosa Linnaeus, 1758; Tipula triangularis Fabricius, 1775; Pedicia triangularis (Fabricius, 1775)

= Pedicia rivosa =

Species of fly

Pedicia rivosa is a species of hairy-eyed cranefly in the family Pediciidae. It is found across most of Europe, but excluding the Iberian Peninsula. The subspecies P. r. mannheimsi is found in France and Germany, and some specimens from Scotland may also belong to this subspecies.
