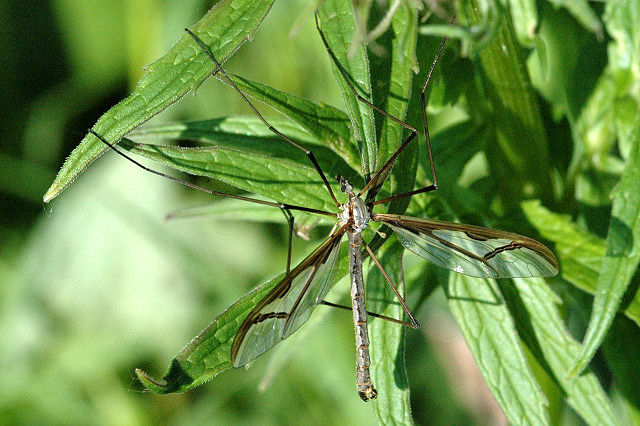
- Pedicia rivosa

Scientific classification
- Domain: Eukaryota
- Kingdom: Animalia
- Phylum: Arthropoda
- Class: Insecta
- Order: Diptera
- Family: Pediciidae
- Genus: Pedicia; Latreille, 1809

Type species
- Tipula rivosa Linnaeus, 1758

Subgenera
- Amalopis Haliday, 1856; Crunobia Kolenati, 1859; Pedicia Latreille, 1809

Diversity
- At least 100 species

Synonyms
- Amalopis Zetterstedt, 1837; Tricyphona Haliday, 1856; Daimiotipula Matsumura, 1916; Peditia

= Pedicia =

Genus of flies

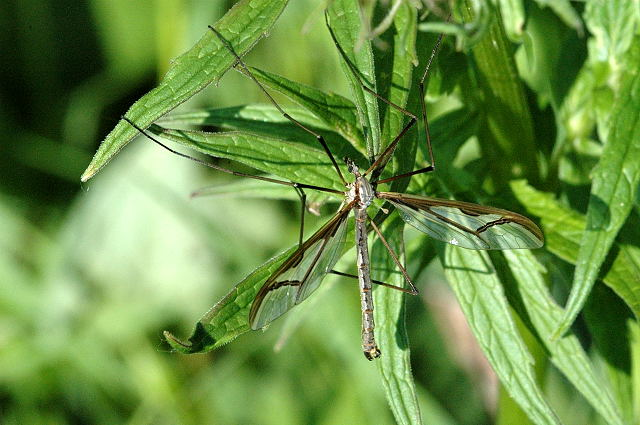
Pedicia rivosa

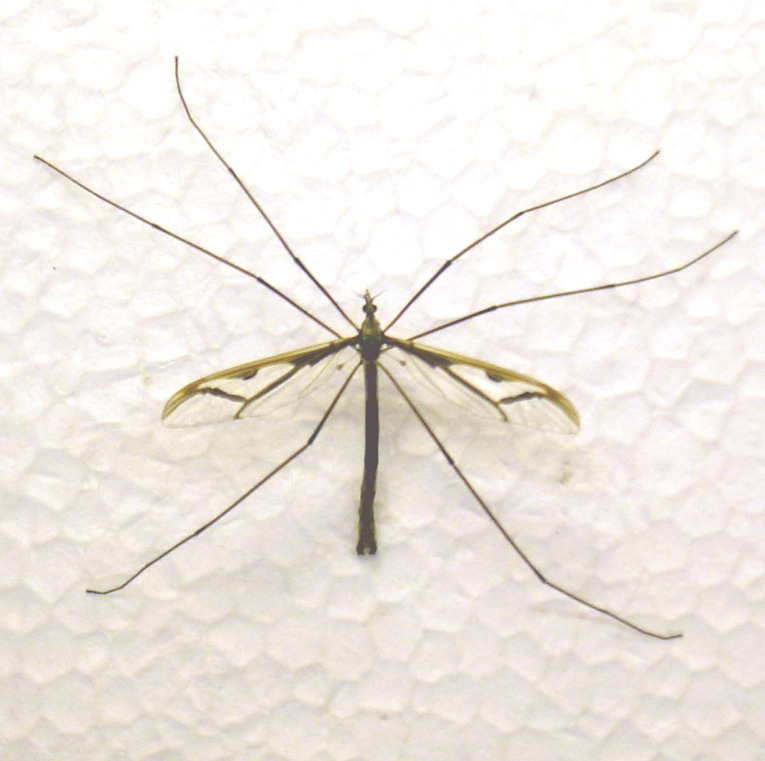
Pedicia rivosa

Pedicia is a genus of hairy-eyed craneflies (family Pediciidae).

== Selected species ==
- Subgenus Amalopis Haliday, 1856

- P. depressiloba Alexander, 1945
- P. fimbriatula Alexander, 1953
- P. norikurae Alexander, 1958
- P. occulta (Meigen, 1830)
- P. pallida Savchenko, 1976
- P. seticauda (Alexander, 1924)
- P. setipennis (Alexander, 1931)
- P. tenuiloba Alexander, 1957
- P. vetusta (Alexander, 1913)

- Subgenus Crunobia Kolenati, 1859

- P. apusenica Ujvarosi & Stary, 2003
- P. dispar Savchenko, 1978
- P. littoralis (Meigen, 1804)
- P. lobifera Savchenko, 1986
- P. nielseni (Slipka, 1955)
- P. pallens Savchenko, 1978
- P. patens Alexander, 1938
- P. persica Alexander, 1975
- P. riedeli (Lackschewitz, 1940)
- P. semireducta Savchenko, 1978
- P. spinifera Stary, 1974
- P. staryi Savchenko, 1978
- P. straminea (Meigen, 1838)
- P. tjederi Mendl, 1974
- P. zangheriana Nielsen, 1950
- P. zernyi (Lackschewitz, 1940)

- Subgenus Pedicia Latreille, 1809

- P. albivitta Walker, 1848
- P. arctica Frey, 1921
- P. baikalica (Alexander, 1930)
- P. bellamyana Alexander, 1964
- P. brachycera Alexander, 1933
- P. cockerelli Alexander, 1925
- P. contermina Walker, 1848
- P. cubitalis Alexander, 1933
- P. daimio (Matsumura, 1916)
- P. falcifera Alexander, 1941
- P. gaudens (Alexander, 1925)
- P. gifuensis Kariya, 1934
- P. goldsworthyi Petersen, 2006
- P. grandior (Alexander, 1923)
- P. issikiella Alexander, 1953
- P. kuwayamai Alexander, 1966
- P. laetabilis Alexander, 1938
- P. lewisiana Alexander, 1958
- P. magnifica (Hine, 1903)
- P. margarita Alexander, 1930
- P. nawai Kariya, 1934
- P. obtusa Osten Sacken, 1877
- P. parvicellula Alexander, 1938
- P. procteriana Alexander, 1939
- P. rivosa (Linnaeus, 1758)
- P. simulata Alexander, 1938
- P. subfalcata Alexander, 1941
- P. subobtusa Alexander, 1949
- P. subtransversa Alexander, 1933

== See also ==
- List of Pedicia species
