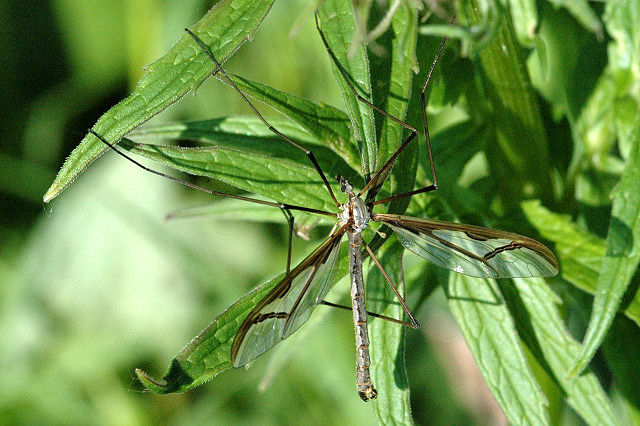
- Pedicia rivosa

Scientific classification
- Kingdom: Animalia
- Phylum: Arthropoda
- Class: Insecta
- Order: Diptera
- Infraorder: Tipulomorpha
- Superfamily: Tipuloidea
- Family: Pediciidae; Osten-Sacken, 1859

Subfamilies
- Pediciinae; Ulinae

= Pediciidae =

Pediciidae Temporal range: Jurassic–Recent

Family of flies

The Pediciidae or hairy-eyed craneflies are a family of flies closely related to true crane flies, with about 500 species worldwide.

== Description ==
Pediciidae are medium-sized to large (5 millimetres (0.20 in), Dicranota; 35 millimetres (1.4 in), Pedicia flies which resemble Tipulidae. The wings, legs and abdomen are long and slender. Ocelli are absent. The eyes are pubescent; short erect hairs are present in between the eye facets (the eyes are usually glabrous in related families). The antennae have 12–17 segments. The thorax has a V-shaped transverse suture. The wing has two anal veins. The apical crossveins and M-Cu form an oblique line. The wings of Pedicia have contrasting brown longitudinal stripes. Full description

== Fossil record ==
The oldest fossils of the family date to the Jurassic.

== Genera ==
- Subfamily Pediciinae

- Dicranota Zetterstedt, 1838
- Heterangaeus Alexander, 1925
- Malaisemyia Alexander, 1950
- Nasiternella Wahlgren, 1904
- Nipponomyia Alexander, 1924
- Ornithodes Coquillett, 1900
- Pedicia Latreille, 1809
- Savchenkoiana Kocak, 1981
- Tricyphona Zetterstedt, 1837

- Subfamily Ulinae

- Ula Haliday, 1833

=== Fossil genera ===
- Fragisternella Upper Oligocene, Asia
- Praearchitipula Itat Formation, Russia, Middle Jurassic, Ichetuy Formation, Russia, Jurassic
