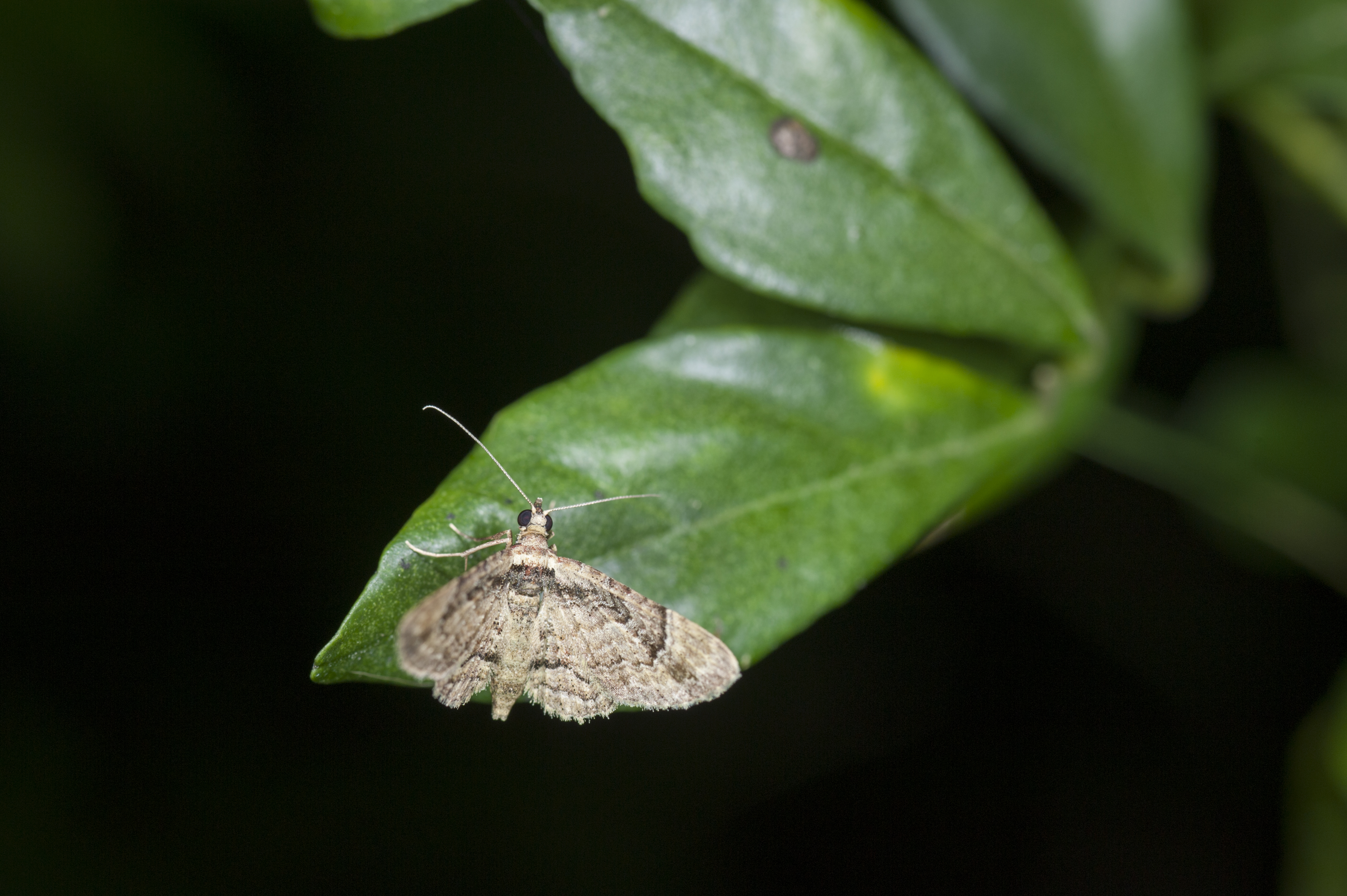
- Gymnoscelis tristrigosa

Scientific classification
- Domain: Eukaryota
- Kingdom: Animalia
- Phylum: Arthropoda
- Class: Insecta
- Order: Lepidoptera
- Family: Geometridae
- Genus: Gymnoscelis
- Species: G. tristrigosa

Binomial name
- Gymnoscelis tristrigosa (Butler, 1880)

Synonyms
- Eupithecia tristrigosa Butler, 1880

= Gymnoscelis tristrigosa =

Species of moth

Gymnoscelis tristrigosa is a moth in the family Geometridae. It was described by Arthur Gardiner Butler in 1880. It is found from Sri Lanka and Taiwan to Fiji, Tonga and New Caledonia.

== Description ==
Its wingspan is about 22 millimetres (0.87 in). Palpi much shorter. Forewings long and narrow, especially in male. Body rufous, slightly with black irrorations (speckles). Head, thorax, and abdomen with black markings. Forewings with diffused black fascia from base of inner margin to the costa at the origin of the postmedial line, which is indistinct and angled at vein 4. The fascia then narrowing and continued above vein 4 to outer margin. Hindwings with a postmedial line highly angled at vein 6. A curved slightly waved submarginal line.

The larvae feed on the young foliage and flowers of Heptapleurum species, often webbing them.

== Taxonomy ==
The species belongs to a species complex clustered around Gymnoscelis imparatalis.

== Subspecies ==
- Gymnoscelis tristrigosa tristrigosa
- Gymnoscelis tristrigosa nasuta Prout, 1958
- Gymnoscelis tristrigosa tongaica Prout, 1958
