= Gymnoscelis ischnophylla =

Scientific classification
- Kingdom: Animalia
- Phylum: Arthropoda
- Class: Insecta
- Order: Lepidoptera
- Family: Geometridae
- Genus: Gymnoscelis
- Species: G. ischnophylla

Binomial name
- Gymnoscelis ischnophylla Turner, 1942

Species of moth

Gymnoscelis ischnophylla is a moth in the family Geometridae. It was described by Alfred Jefferis Turner in 1942. It is found in Australia (Queensland).

== Taxonomy ==
The species belongs to a species complex clustered around Gymnoscelis imparatalis.
