= Eupithecia dearmata =

Scientific classification
- Kingdom: Animalia
- Phylum: Arthropoda
- Class: Insecta
- Order: Lepidoptera
- Family: Geometridae
- Genus: Eupithecia
- Species: E. dearmata

Binomial name
- Eupithecia dearmata Dietze, 1904

Synonyms
- Gymnoscelis dearmata (Dietze, 1904)

Species of moth

Eupithecia dearmata is a moth in the family Geometridae. It is found in Turkey. Adults have dull grey wings with a large number of scattered dark scales and a wing span of 14–15 mm.

== Taxonomy ==
The species was originally described by Karl Dietze in genus Eupithecia, though he mentioned the possibility that it might instead belong to genus Gymnoscelis, to which it was later transferred. In 2013, it was however restored to its original genus by Vladimir Mironov, whose placement has been followed by subsequent authors.
