= Gymnoscelis semialbida =

Scientific classification
- Kingdom: Animalia
- Phylum: Arthropoda
- Class: Insecta
- Order: Lepidoptera
- Family: Geometridae
- Genus: Gymnoscelis
- Species: G. semialbida

Binomial name
- Gymnoscelis semialbida (Walker, 1866)

Synonyms
- Eupithecia semialbida Walker, 1866

Species of moth

Gymnoscelis semialbida is a moth in the family Geometridae. It is found on Borneo.

== Taxonomy ==
The species belongs to a species complex clustered around Gymnoscelis imparatalis.
