= Gymnoscelis yurikae =

Scientific classification
- Kingdom: Animalia
- Phylum: Arthropoda
- Class: Insecta
- Order: Lepidoptera
- Family: Geometridae
- Genus: Gymnoscelis
- Species: G. yurikae

Binomial name
- Gymnoscelis yurikae Inoue, 2002

Species of moth

Gymnoscelis yurikae is a moth in the family Geometridae. It was described by Hiroshi Inoue in 2002. It is endemic to Japan where it is known from Okinawa.

The wingspan is 12–15 mm (0.47–0.59 in). The larvae were reared from Sambucus chinensis.
