= Gymnoscelis olsoufieffae =

Scientific classification
- Kingdom: Animalia
- Phylum: Arthropoda
- Clade: Pancrustacea
- Class: Insecta
- Order: Lepidoptera
- Family: Geometridae
- Genus: Gymnoscelis
- Species: G. olsoufieffae

Binomial name
- Gymnoscelis olsoufieffae Prout, 1937

Species of moth

Gymnoscelis olsoufieffae is a moth in the family Geometridae. It was described by Louis Beethoven Prout in 1937. It is endemic to South Africa.
