= Gymnoscelis daniloi =

Scientific classification
- Kingdom: Animalia
- Phylum: Arthropoda
- Class: Insecta
- Order: Lepidoptera
- Family: Geometridae
- Genus: Gymnoscelis
- Species: G. daniloi

Binomial name
- Gymnoscelis daniloi Hausmann, 2009

Species of moth

Gymnoscelis daniloi is a moth in the family Geometridae. It occurs on the island of Fogo, Cape Verde. The type location is Portela, Chã das Caldeiras, elevation 1720 m. The species was first described in 2009.

The wingspan is 18–20 mm (0.71–0.79 in).
