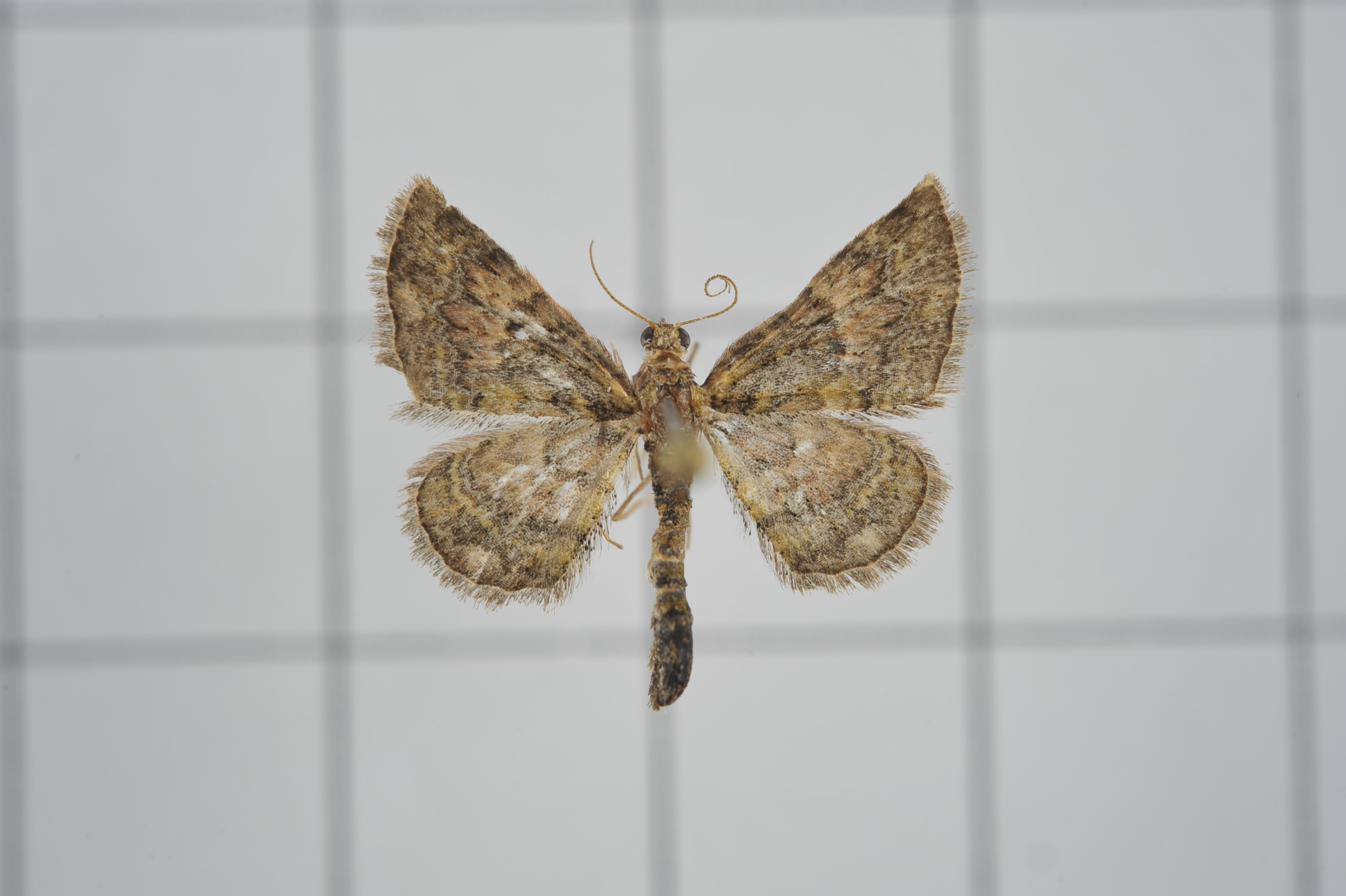

Scientific classification
- Domain: Eukaryota
- Kingdom: Animalia
- Phylum: Arthropoda
- Class: Insecta
- Order: Lepidoptera
- Family: Geometridae
- Genus: Gymnoscelis
- Species: G. albicaudata

Binomial name
- Gymnoscelis albicaudata Warren, 1897

= Gymnoscelis albicaudata =

Species of moth

Gymnoscelis albicaudata is a moth in the family Geometridae. It is found in the north-eastern Himalayas and on Peninsular Malaysia, Java, Bali, Borneo, the Philippines, Taiwan and Japan. The habitat consists of upper montane forests.
