= Gymnoscelis pallidirufa =

Scientific classification
- Domain: Eukaryota
- Kingdom: Animalia
- Phylum: Arthropoda
- Class: Insecta
- Order: Lepidoptera
- Family: Geometridae
- Genus: Gymnoscelis
- Species: G. pallidirufa

Binomial name
- Gymnoscelis pallidirufa Warren, 1897

Species of moth

Gymnoscelis pallidirufa is a moth in the family Geometridae. It is found on Sulawesi.
