= Gymnoscelis oblenita =

Scientific classification
- Kingdom: Animalia
- Phylum: Arthropoda
- Clade: Pancrustacea
- Class: Insecta
- Order: Lepidoptera
- Family: Geometridae
- Genus: Gymnoscelis
- Species: G. oblenita

Binomial name
- Gymnoscelis oblenita Prout, 1958

Species of moth

Gymnoscelis oblenita is a moth in the family Geometridae. It was described by Louis Beethoven Prout in 1958. It is endemic to Malaysia.
