= Gymnoscelis pseudotibialis =

Scientific classification
- Kingdom: Animalia
- Phylum: Arthropoda
- Clade: Pancrustacea
- Class: Insecta
- Order: Lepidoptera
- Family: Geometridae
- Genus: Gymnoscelis
- Species: G. pseudotibialis

Binomial name
- Gymnoscelis pseudotibialis Holloway, 1997

Species of moth

Gymnoscelis pseudotibialis is a moth in the family Geometridae. It is found on Borneo, Peninsular Malaysia and in Singapore. The habitat consists of montane areas.

The length of the forewings is 7–8 millimetres (0.28–0.31 in).

The larvae have been recorded feeding on the flowers of Hevea species.
