= Gymnoscelis latipennis =

Scientific classification
- Domain: Eukaryota
- Kingdom: Animalia
- Phylum: Arthropoda
- Class: Insecta
- Order: Lepidoptera
- Family: Geometridae
- Genus: Gymnoscelis
- Species: G. latipennis

Binomial name
- Gymnoscelis latipennis Prout, 1958

Species of moth

Gymnoscelis latipennis is a moth in the family Geometridae. It is found on Peninsular Malaysia and Borneo. The habitat consists of alluvial forest and lower montane forests.
