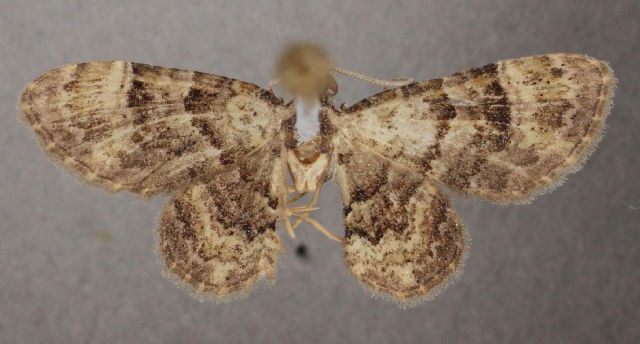

Scientific classification
- Kingdom: Animalia
- Phylum: Arthropoda
- Clade: Pancrustacea
- Class: Insecta
- Order: Lepidoptera
- Family: Geometridae
- Genus: Gymnoscelis
- Species: G. lavella

Binomial name
- Gymnoscelis lavella Prout, 1958

= Gymnoscelis lavella =

Species of moth

Gymnoscelis lavella is species of moth that belongs to the family Geometridae. It is found on the Solomon Islands. It was described by Louis Beethoven Prout in 1958.
