= Gymnoscelis tanaoptila =

Scientific classification
- Domain: Eukaryota
- Kingdom: Animalia
- Phylum: Arthropoda
- Class: Insecta
- Order: Lepidoptera
- Family: Geometridae
- Genus: Gymnoscelis
- Species: G. tanaoptila

Binomial name
- Gymnoscelis tanaoptila Turner, 1907

Species of moth

Gymnoscelis tanaoptila is a moth in the family Geometridae. It was described by Alfred Jefferis Turner in 1907. It is found in Australia (Queensland).
