= Gymnoscelis phoenicopus =

Scientific classification
- Kingdom: Animalia
- Phylum: Arthropoda
- Clade: Pancrustacea
- Class: Insecta
- Order: Lepidoptera
- Family: Geometridae
- Genus: Gymnoscelis
- Species: G. phoenicopus

Binomial name
- Gymnoscelis phoenicopus Prout, 1958

Species of moth

Gymnoscelis phoenicopus is a moth in the family Geometridae. It was described by Prout in 1958. It is found on Seram, Sulawesi and Borneo. The habitat consists of lower montane forests.
