= Gymnoscelis silvicola =

Scientific classification
- Kingdom: Animalia
- Phylum: Arthropoda
- Clade: Pancrustacea
- Class: Insecta
- Order: Lepidoptera
- Family: Geometridae
- Genus: Gymnoscelis
- Species: G. silvicola

Binomial name
- Gymnoscelis silvicola Vojnits, 1994

Species of moth

Gymnoscelis silvicola is a moth in the family Geometridae. It was described by András Mátyás Vojnits in 1994. It is found in the Afrotropical realm.
