= Gymnoscelis montgomeryi =

Scientific classification
- Kingdom: Animalia
- Phylum: Arthropoda
- Class: Insecta
- Order: Lepidoptera
- Family: Geometridae
- Genus: Gymnoscelis
- Species: G. montgomeryi

Binomial name
- Gymnoscelis montgomeryi Inoue, 1988

Species of moth

Gymnoscelis montgomeryi is a moth in the family Geometridae. It is endemic to Japan.
