= Gymnoscelis festiva =

Scientific classification
- Domain: Eukaryota
- Kingdom: Animalia
- Phylum: Arthropoda
- Class: Insecta
- Order: Lepidoptera
- Family: Geometridae
- Genus: Gymnoscelis
- Species: G. festiva

Binomial name
- Gymnoscelis festiva Warren, 1903

Species of moth

Gymnoscelis festiva is a moth in the family Geometridae. It is found on New Guinea and on Buru and Sulawesi.

== Subspecies ==
- Gymnoscelis festiva festiva (New Guinea)
- Gymnoscelis festiva buruensis Prout, 1958 (Buru)
- Gymnoscelis festiva jubilata Prout, 1958 (Sulawesi)
