= Gymnoscelis mesophoena =

Scientific classification
- Domain: Eukaryota
- Kingdom: Animalia
- Phylum: Arthropoda
- Class: Insecta
- Order: Lepidoptera
- Family: Geometridae
- Genus: Gymnoscelis
- Species: G. mesophoena

Binomial name
- Gymnoscelis mesophoena Turner, 1907

Species of moth

Gymnoscelis mesophoena is a moth in the Geometridae. It was described by Alfred Jefferis Turner in 1907. It is found in Australia (Queensland) and on the St Matthias Islands of Papua New Guinea.

== Subspecies ==
- Gymnoscelis mesophoena mesophoena
- Gymnoscelis mesophoena hagia Prout, 1958 (St Matthias Islands)
