= Gymnoscelis argyropasta =

Scientific classification
- Kingdom: Animalia
- Phylum: Arthropoda
- Clade: Pancrustacea
- Class: Insecta
- Order: Lepidoptera
- Family: Geometridae
- Genus: Gymnoscelis
- Species: G. argyropasta

Binomial name
- Gymnoscelis argyropasta Prout, 1958

Species of moth

Gymnoscelis argyropasta is a moth in the family Geometridae. It is found in on the St Matthias Islands of Papua New Guinea.
