= Gymnoscelis crassifemur =

Scientific classification
- Domain: Eukaryota
- Kingdom: Animalia
- Phylum: Arthropoda
- Class: Insecta
- Order: Lepidoptera
- Family: Geometridae
- Genus: Gymnoscelis
- Species: G. crassifemur

Binomial name
- Gymnoscelis crassifemur Warren, 1906

Species of moth

Gymnoscelis crassifemur is a moth in the family Geometridae. It was described by William Warren in 1906. It is endemic to New Guinea. The wings are 17 millimetres (0.67 in) long. Its hindwings are violet while its abdomen and thorax are green.
