= Gymnoscelis holoprasia =

Scientific classification
- Kingdom: Animalia
- Phylum: Arthropoda
- Clade: Pancrustacea
- Class: Insecta
- Order: Lepidoptera
- Family: Geometridae
- Genus: Gymnoscelis
- Species: G. holoprasia

Binomial name
- Gymnoscelis holoprasia Prout, 1958

Species of moth

Gymnoscelis holoprasia is a moth in the Geometridae family. It was described by Louis Beethoven Prout in 1958. It is found on Bali.
