= Gymnoscelis tylocera =

Scientific classification
- Kingdom: Animalia
- Phylum: Arthropoda
- Clade: Pancrustacea
- Class: Insecta
- Order: Lepidoptera
- Family: Geometridae
- Genus: Gymnoscelis
- Species: G. tylocera

Binomial name
- Gymnoscelis tylocera Prout, 1930

Synonyms
- Gymnoscelis tyloceia

Species of moth

Gymnoscelis tylocera is a moth in the family Geometridae. It was described by Louis Beethoven Prout in 1930. It is endemic to Fiji.
