= Gymnoscelis tenera =

Scientific classification
- Kingdom: Animalia
- Phylum: Arthropoda
- Class: Insecta
- Order: Lepidoptera
- Family: Geometridae
- Genus: Gymnoscelis
- Species: G. tenera

Binomial name
- Gymnoscelis tenera Warren, 1901

Species of moth

Gymnoscelis tenera is a moth in the family Geometridae. It was described by William Warren in 1901. It is found in Nigeria and on the Seychelles.
