= Gymnoscelis perpusilla =

Scientific classification
- Domain: Eukaryota
- Kingdom: Animalia
- Phylum: Arthropoda
- Class: Insecta
- Order: Lepidoptera
- Family: Geometridae
- Genus: Gymnoscelis
- Species: G. perpusilla

Binomial name
- Gymnoscelis perpusilla Turner, 1942

Species of moth

Gymnoscelis perpusilla is a moth in the family Geometridae. It was described by Alfred Jefferis Turner in 1942. It is found in Queensland, Australia.
