= Gymnoscelis crassata =

Scientific classification
- Kingdom: Animalia
- Phylum: Arthropoda
- Class: Insecta
- Order: Lepidoptera
- Family: Geometridae
- Genus: Gymnoscelis
- Species: G. crassata

Binomial name
- Gymnoscelis crassata Warren, 1901

Species of moth

Gymnoscelis crassata is a moth in the family Geometridae. It was described by William Warren in 1901. It is found on São Tomé, Ghana, Ivory Coast, Nigeria, Sierra Leone and Tanzania.

== Subspecies ==
- Gymnoscelis crassata crassata
- Gymnoscelis crassata varians Prout, 1937
