= Gymnoscelis desiderata =

Scientific classification
- Kingdom: Animalia
- Phylum: Arthropoda
- Clade: Pancrustacea
- Class: Insecta
- Order: Lepidoptera
- Family: Geometridae
- Genus: Gymnoscelis
- Species: G. desiderata

Binomial name
- Gymnoscelis desiderata (Prout, 1927)

Synonyms
- Chloroclystis desiderata Prout, 1927; Chloroclystis austerula Prout, 1937

Species of moth

Gymnoscelis desiderata is a moth in the family Geometridae. It was described by Louis Beethoven Prout in 1927. It is found on São Tomé.

== Subspecies ==
- Gymnoscelis desiderata desiderata
- Gymnoscelis desiderata austerula (Prout, 1937)
- Gymnoscelis desiderata occidentalis Herbulot, 1988
