= Gymnoscelis melaninfra =

Scientific classification
- Kingdom: Animalia
- Phylum: Arthropoda
- Class: Insecta
- Order: Lepidoptera
- Family: Geometridae
- Genus: Gymnoscelis
- Species: G. melaninfra

Binomial name
- Gymnoscelis melaninfra Inoue, 1994

Species of moth

Gymnoscelis melaninfra is a moth in the family Geometridae. It was described by Hiroshi Inoue in 1994. It is endemic to Japan.
