= Gymnoscelis caelestis =

Scientific classification
- Kingdom: Animalia
- Phylum: Arthropoda
- Clade: Pancrustacea
- Class: Insecta
- Order: Lepidoptera
- Family: Geometridae
- Genus: Gymnoscelis
- Species: G. caelestis

Binomial name
- Gymnoscelis caelestis Vojnits, 1988

Species of moth

Gymnoscelis caelestis is a moth in the family Geometridae.
