= Gymnoscelis merochyta =

Scientific classification
- Kingdom: Animalia
- Phylum: Arthropoda
- Clade: Pancrustacea
- Class: Insecta
- Order: Lepidoptera
- Family: Geometridae
- Genus: Gymnoscelis
- Species: G. merochyta

Binomial name
- Gymnoscelis merochyta Prout, 1932

Species of moth

Gymnoscelis merochyta is a moth in the family Geometridae. It is found on Peninsular Malaysia and Borneo.

Adults have pale hindwings and brown forewings with pale areas across the dorsum and basally.
