= Gymnoscelis inexpressa =

Scientific classification
- Kingdom: Animalia
- Phylum: Arthropoda
- Clade: Pancrustacea
- Class: Insecta
- Order: Lepidoptera
- Family: Geometridae
- Genus: Gymnoscelis
- Species: G. inexpressa

Binomial name
- Gymnoscelis inexpressa Prout, 1923

Species of moth

Gymnoscelis inexpressa is a moth in the family Geometridae. It was described by Louis Beethoven Prout in 1923. It is endemic to India.
