= Gymnoscelis nigrescens =

Scientific classification
- Domain: Eukaryota
- Kingdom: Animalia
- Phylum: Arthropoda
- Class: Insecta
- Order: Lepidoptera
- Family: Geometridae
- Genus: Gymnoscelis
- Species: G. nigrescens

Binomial name
- Gymnoscelis nigrescens Warren, 1898

Species of moth

Gymnoscelis nigrescens is a moth in the family Geometridae. It was described by William Warren in 1898. It is found on the Kai Islands.
