= Gymnoscelis erymna =

Scientific classification
- Domain: Eukaryota
- Kingdom: Animalia
- Phylum: Arthropoda
- Class: Insecta
- Order: Lepidoptera
- Family: Geometridae
- Genus: Gymnoscelis
- Species: G. erymna

Binomial name
- Gymnoscelis erymna (Meyrick, 1886)

Synonyms
- Eupithecia erymna Meyrick, 1886; Gymnoscelis semipurpurea Rebel, 1915

Species of moth

Gymnoscelis erymna is a moth in the family Geometridae. It was described by Edward Meyrick in 1886. It is found on Tonga and Fiji, as well as in Australia.
