= Gymnoscelis oribiensis =

Scientific classification
- Domain: Eukaryota
- Kingdom: Animalia
- Phylum: Arthropoda
- Class: Insecta
- Order: Lepidoptera
- Family: Geometridae
- Genus: Gymnoscelis
- Species: G. oribiensis

Binomial name
- Gymnoscelis oribiensis Herbulot, 1981

Species of moth

Gymnoscelis oribiensis is a moth in the family Geometridae. It was described by Claude Herbulot in 1981. It is found in South Africa.
