= Gymnoscelis bassa =

Scientific classification
- Kingdom: Animalia
- Phylum: Arthropoda
- Class: Insecta
- Order: Lepidoptera
- Family: Geometridae
- Genus: Gymnoscelis
- Species: G. bassa

Binomial name
- Gymnoscelis bassa Herbulot, 1981

Species of moth

Gymnoscelis bassa is a moth in the family Geometridae. It is found in Cameroon.
