= Gymnoscelis callichlora =

Scientific classification
- Domain: Eukaryota
- Kingdom: Animalia
- Phylum: Arthropoda
- Class: Insecta
- Order: Lepidoptera
- Family: Geometridae
- Genus: Gymnoscelis
- Species: G. callichlora

Binomial name
- Gymnoscelis callichlora Turner, 1907

Species of moth

Gymnoscelis callichlora is a moth in the family Geometridae. It was described by Alfred Jefferis Turner in 1907 and it is found in Australia (Queensland).
