= Gymnoscelis derogata =

Scientific classification
- Kingdom: Animalia
- Phylum: Arthropoda
- Class: Insecta
- Order: Lepidoptera
- Family: Geometridae
- Genus: Gymnoscelis
- Species: G. derogata

Binomial name
- Gymnoscelis derogata (Walker, 1866)

Synonyms
- Eupithecia derogata Walker, 1866; Gymnoscelis subrufata Warren, 1898

Species of moth

Gymnoscelis derogata is a moth in the family Geometridae. It is found on Borneo, Peninsular Malaysia, the north-eastern Himalayas, Sulawesi, New Guinea and in Queensland.

The larvae have been recorded feeding on Macadamia species.

== Subspecies ==
- Gymnoscelis derogata derogata (Borneo, Peninsular Malaysia, Himalaya)
- Gymnoscelis derogata abrogata Prout, 1958 (New Guinea)
- Gymnoscelis derogata griseifusa Prout, 1958 (Sulawesi)
