= Gymnoscelis smithersi =

Scientific classification
- Kingdom: Animalia
- Phylum: Arthropoda
- Clade: Pancrustacea
- Class: Insecta
- Order: Lepidoptera
- Family: Geometridae
- Genus: Gymnoscelis
- Species: G. smithersi

Binomial name
- Gymnoscelis smithersi (Holloway, 1977)

Synonyms
- Ziridava smithersi Holloway, 1977

Species of moth

Gymnoscelis smithersi is a 10 millimetres (0.39 in) moth in the family Geometridae. It is found on Norfolk Island.
