= Gymnoscelis fragilis =

Scientific classification
- Domain: Eukaryota
- Kingdom: Animalia
- Phylum: Arthropoda
- Class: Insecta
- Order: Lepidoptera
- Family: Geometridae
- Genus: Gymnoscelis
- Species: G. fragilis

Binomial name
- Gymnoscelis fragilis (Warren, 1900)

Species of moth

Gymnoscelis fragilis is a moth in the family Geometridae. It is found on New Guinea.
