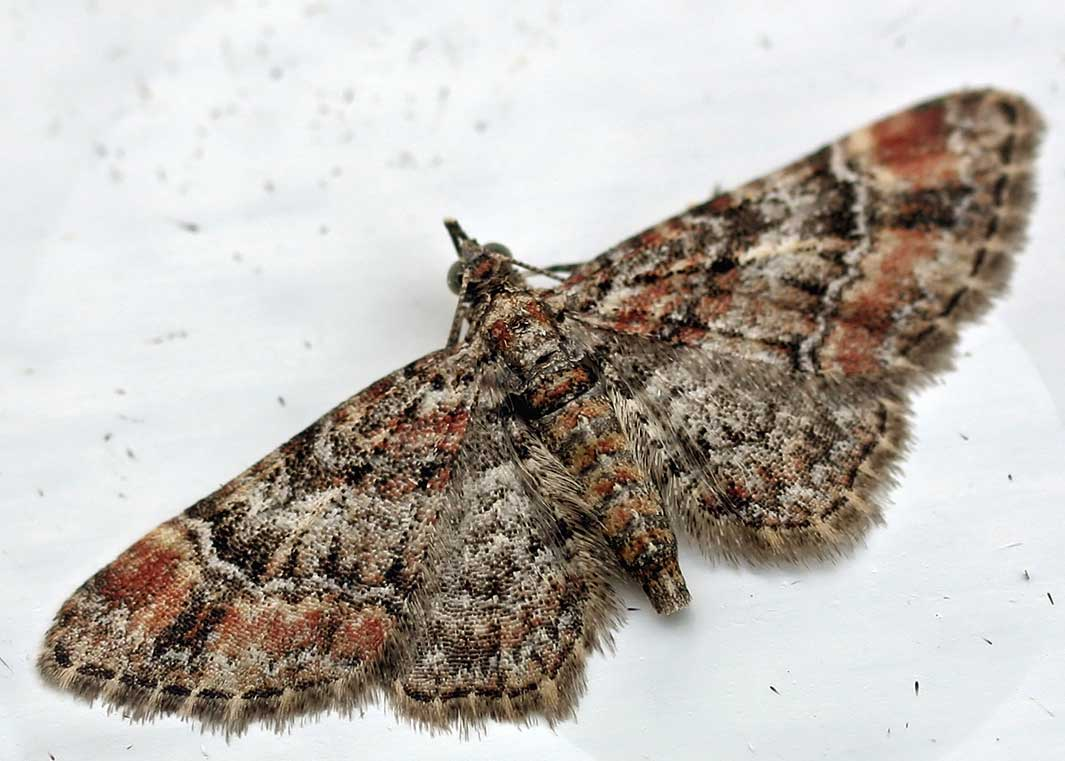

Scientific classification
- Domain: Eukaryota
- Kingdom: Animalia
- Phylum: Arthropoda
- Class: Insecta
- Order: Lepidoptera
- Family: Geometridae
- Genus: Gymnoscelis
- Species: G. rufifasciata

Binomial name
- Gymnoscelis rufifasciata (Haworth, 1809)

Synonyms
- List: Phalaena rufifasciata Haworth, 1809; Phalaena bistrigata Haworth, 1809; Eupithecia bucovinata Hormuzaki, 1893; Eupithecia globulariata Milliere, 1861; Larentia improbata Lienig & Zeller, 1846; Eupithecia incertata Milliere, 1876; Eupithecia parvularia Herrich-Schäffer, 1848; Geometra pumilata Hubner, 1813; Eupithecia recictaria Boisduval, 1840; Larentia tempestivata Zeller, 1847; Eupithecia insulariata Stainton, 1859; Gymnoscelis insulariata; Gymnoscelis bicoloria Bethune-Baker, 1891; Gymnoscelis obtusata Rebel, 1940; Gymnoscelis palmata Pinker, 1962; Gymnoscelis lundbladi Prout, 1940; Gymnoscelis fernandezi Pinker & Bacallado, 1975; Tephroclystia schulzi Rebel, 1914; Gymnoscelis schulzi

= Double-striped pug =

Species of moth

The double-striped pug (Gymnoscelis rufifasciata) is a moth of the family Geometridae. It is a widespread and common species, being found throughout the Palearctic region, including the Near East and North Africa.

This is a variable species but always easy to recognize due to the two prominent dark fascia across each forewing which give the species its common name. The forewing ground colour ranges from light to dark reddish brown. The crosslines are distinct. The inner margin of the pale white sub-marginal line bears black marks. The hindwings are pale grey with darker fringes, darker lines and a small black discal spot. There is a dark band across the basal segments of the abdomen. The wingspan is 15–19 mm.

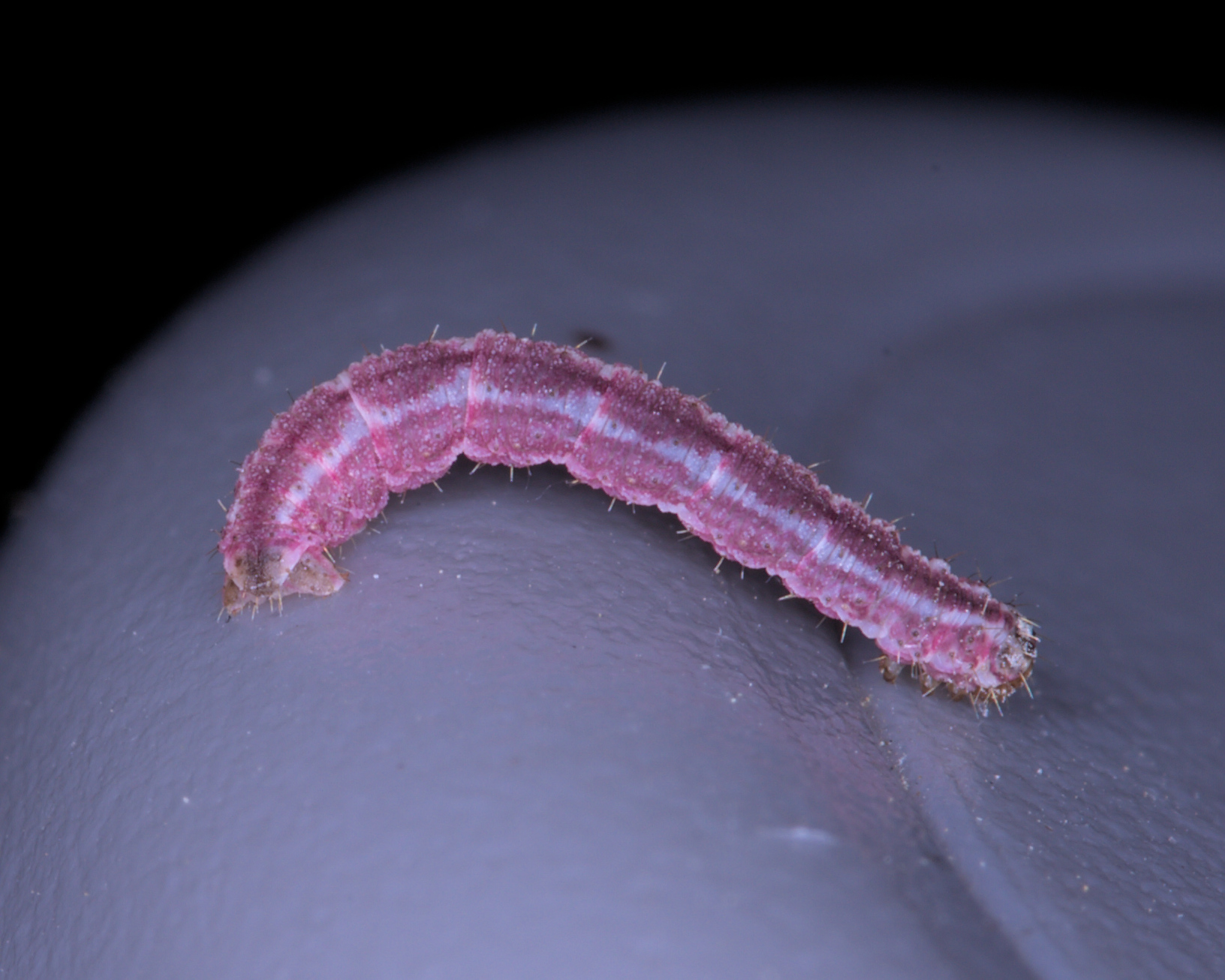

The caterpillars reach a length of up to 17 millimeters and have a very variable basic colouration. It ranges from whitish to yellowish green, brown, red to purple. On the back there is a pale band marked with a series of dark diamonds or triangles. The drawing resembles a rear-facing trident, is sometimes crow-foot-like and can occasionally be only weakly formed. The head is yellowish brown.

Two, sometimes three, broods are produced each year and the adults are on the wing in April and May (sometimes earlier), July and August, and sometimes later in the autumn. Later broods are more heavily marked. It flies at night and is attracted to light and flowers, both of its food plants and others.

The larva feeds on the flowers of a huge range of plants (see list below) and has also been known to feed on the larvae of other lepidoptera. The species overwinters as a pupa.

== Recorded food plants ==
- Calluna - heather
- Citrus
- Clematis - traveller's joy
- Cynara - cardoon
- Cytisus - broom
- Dianthus
- Diospyros - persimmon
- Epilobium - rosebay willowherb
- Ilex - holly
- Ipomoea - sweet potato
- Lycopersicon - tomato
- Malus - apple
- Olea - olive
- Rosa - rose
- Rubus - raspberry
- Senecio - ragwort
- Sorbus - rowan
- Ulex - gorse
- Vicia - broad bean
- Zea - maize
