= Gymnoscelis celaenephes =

Scientific classification
- Kingdom: Animalia
- Phylum: Arthropoda
- Clade: Pancrustacea
- Class: Insecta
- Order: Lepidoptera
- Family: Geometridae
- Genus: Gymnoscelis
- Species: G. celaenephes

Binomial name
- Gymnoscelis celaenephes Turner, 1907

Species of moth

Gymnoscelis celaenephes is a moth in the family Geometridae. It is found in Australia (Queensland). The species was described by Alfred Jefferis Turner, Australian entomologist, in 1907. It belongs to the genus Gymnoscelis, a group of geometrid moths classified within the subfamily Larentiinae.
