= Gymnoscelis prouti =

Scientific classification
- Kingdom: Animalia
- Phylum: Arthropoda
- Clade: Pancrustacea
- Class: Insecta
- Order: Lepidoptera
- Family: Geometridae
- Genus: Gymnoscelis
- Species: G. prouti

Binomial name
- Gymnoscelis prouti Holloway, 1997

Species of moth

Gymnoscelis prouti is a moth in the family Geometridae. It is found on Borneo, Sumatra, Peninsular Malaysia and the north-eastern Himalayas. The habitat consists of upper montane areas.

The length of the forewings is 8–9 millimetres (0.31–0.35 in).
