= Gymnoscelis fasciata =

Scientific classification
- Kingdom: Animalia
- Phylum: Arthropoda
- Class: Insecta
- Order: Lepidoptera
- Family: Geometridae
- Genus: Gymnoscelis
- Species: G. fasciata

Binomial name
- Gymnoscelis fasciata (Hampson ,1891)

Synonyms
- Eupithecia fasciata Hampson, 1891

Species of moth

Gymnoscelis fasciata is a moth in the family Geometridae. It is found in India and on Peninsular Malaysia, Borneo, the Philippines and Sulawesi. The habitat consists of upper montane and dipterocarp forests.
