= Gymnoscelis spodias =

Scientific classification
- Domain: Eukaryota
- Kingdom: Animalia
- Phylum: Arthropoda
- Class: Insecta
- Order: Lepidoptera
- Family: Geometridae
- Genus: Gymnoscelis
- Species: G. spodias

Binomial name
- Gymnoscelis spodias Turner, 1922

Species of moth

Gymnoscelis spodias is a moth in the family Geometridae. It was described by Alfred Jefferis Turner in 1922. It is found in Australia (Queensland).
