= Gymnoscelis idiograpta =

Scientific classification
- Kingdom: Animalia
- Phylum: Arthropoda
- Clade: Pancrustacea
- Class: Insecta
- Order: Lepidoptera
- Family: Geometridae
- Genus: Gymnoscelis
- Species: G. idiograpta

Binomial name
- Gymnoscelis idiograpta Prout, 1935

Species of moth

Gymnoscelis idiograpta is a moth in the family Geometridae. It was described by Louis Beethoven Prout in 1935. It is found on São Tomé.
