= Gymnoscelis coquina =

Scientific classification
- Domain: Eukaryota
- Kingdom: Animalia
- Phylum: Arthropoda
- Class: Insecta
- Order: Lepidoptera
- Family: Geometridae
- Genus: Gymnoscelis
- Species: G. coquina

Binomial name
- Gymnoscelis coquina Warren, 1897

Species of moth

Gymnoscelis coquina is a moth in the family Geometridae. It was described by William Warren in 1897. It is found in Queensland, Australia.

== Description ==
The species is 18–20 millimetres (0.71–0.79 in) and has white coloured wing undersides. Its hindwings are greyish with black spots. The abdomen is pinkish.
