= Gymnoscelis birivulata =

Scientific classification
- Domain: Eukaryota
- Kingdom: Animalia
- Phylum: Arthropoda
- Class: Insecta
- Order: Lepidoptera
- Family: Geometridae
- Genus: Gymnoscelis
- Species: G. birivulata

Binomial name
- Gymnoscelis birivulata Warren, 1902

Species of moth

Gymnoscelis birivulata is a moth in the family Geometridae. It is found in Kenya and on São Tomé.
