= Gymnoscelis confusata =

Scientific classification
- Kingdom: Animalia
- Phylum: Arthropoda
- Class: Insecta
- Order: Lepidoptera
- Family: Geometridae
- Genus: Gymnoscelis
- Species: G. confusata

Binomial name
- Gymnoscelis confusata (Walker, 1866)

Synonyms
- Eupithecia confusata Walker, 1866; Eupithecia subtristigera Walker, 1866

Species of moth

Gymnoscelis confusata is a moth in the family Geometridae. It is found on Borneo and Peninsular Malaysia and in Singapore and possibly India.
