= Gymnoscelis admixtaria =

Scientific classification
- Domain: Eukaryota
- Kingdom: Animalia
- Phylum: Arthropoda
- Class: Insecta
- Order: Lepidoptera
- Family: Geometridae
- Genus: Gymnoscelis
- Species: G. admixtaria

Binomial name
- Gymnoscelis admixtaria (Walker, 1862)

Synonyms
- Eupithecia admixtaria Walker, 1862; Chloroclystis admixtaria

Species of moth

Gymnoscelis admixtaria is a moth in the family Geometridae. It was described by Francis Walker in 1862. It is found in Sri Lanka, India and Japan.

== Description ==
The wingspan is about 16 millimetres (0.63 in) in the male and 20 millimetres (0.79 in) in the female. Palpi with second joint reaching slightly beyond the frons. Hindwings with vein 3 from angle of cell or shortly stalked with vein 4. Males lack secondary sexual characteristics on the wings. Adults are rufous with a slight olive tinge. The forewings have indistinct waved lines on the basal area and some black on the base of the costa. The hindwings have a diffused black subbasal line and traces of a medial line. A postmedial line sharply angled at vein 4, and with diffused black and rufous inside it. The outer area with a more distinct olive tinge and a pale waved submarginal line.
