= Gymnoscelis harterti =

Scientific classification
- Domain: Eukaryota
- Kingdom: Animalia
- Phylum: Arthropoda
- Class: Insecta
- Order: Lepidoptera
- Family: Geometridae
- Genus: Gymnoscelis
- Species: G. harterti

Binomial name
- Gymnoscelis harterti Rothschild, 1915

Species of moth

Gymnoscelis harterti is a moth in the family Geometridae. It was described by Walter Rothschild in 1915. It is found in Algeria.
