= Gymnoscelis lophopus =

Scientific classification
- Domain: Eukaryota
- Kingdom: Animalia
- Phylum: Arthropoda
- Class: Insecta
- Order: Lepidoptera
- Family: Geometridae
- Genus: Gymnoscelis
- Species: G. lophopus

Binomial name
- Gymnoscelis lophopus Turner, 1904

Synonyms
- Gymnoscelis homogona Turner, 1907

Species of moth

Gymnoscelis lophopus is a moth in the family Geometridae. It was described by Turner in 1904. It is found in Queensland, Australia.

The wingspan is about 20 millimetres (0.79 in). Adults have brown patterned wings.
