= Gymnoscelis anaxia =

Scientific classification
- Kingdom: Animalia
- Phylum: Arthropoda
- Clade: Pancrustacea
- Class: Insecta
- Order: Lepidoptera
- Family: Geometridae
- Genus: Gymnoscelis
- Species: G. anaxia

Binomial name
- Gymnoscelis anaxia Prout, 1958

Synonyms
- Collix dichobathra anaxia Prout, 1958

Species of moth

Gymnoscelis anaxia is a moth in the family Geometridae. It is found in Australia (Queensland).
