= Gymnoscelis celebensis =

Scientific classification
- Kingdom: Animalia
- Phylum: Arthropoda
- Clade: Pancrustacea
- Class: Insecta
- Order: Lepidoptera
- Family: Geometridae
- Genus: Gymnoscelis
- Species: G. celebensis

Binomial name
- Gymnoscelis celebensis Prout, 1958

Synonyms
- Gymnoscelis mesophoena celebensis Prout, 1958

Species of moth

Gymnoscelis celebensis is a moth in the family Geometridae. It was described by Louis Beethoven Prout in 1958. It is found on Sulawesi, Seram and Borneo. The habitat consists of primary forests.
