= Gymnoscelis sara =

Scientific classification
- Domain: Eukaryota
- Kingdom: Animalia
- Phylum: Arthropoda
- Class: Insecta
- Order: Lepidoptera
- Family: Geometridae
- Genus: Gymnoscelis
- Species: G. sara

Binomial name
- Gymnoscelis sara Robinson, 1975

Species of moth

Gymnoscelis sara is a moth in the family Geometridae. It is found on Fiji, New Caledonia and Vanuatu.

== Subspecies ==
- Gymnoscelis sara sara
- Gymnoscelis sara hamata Holloway, 1979
