= Gymnoscelis carneata =

Scientific classification
- Domain: Eukaryota
- Kingdom: Animalia
- Phylum: Arthropoda
- Class: Insecta
- Order: Lepidoptera
- Family: Geometridae
- Genus: Gymnoscelis
- Species: G. carneata

Binomial name
- Gymnoscelis carneata Warren, 1902

Species of moth

Gymnoscelis carneata is a moth in the family Geometridae. It is found in Kenya.
