= Gymnoscelis chlorobapta =

Scientific classification
- Domain: Eukaryota
- Kingdom: Animalia
- Phylum: Arthropoda
- Class: Insecta
- Order: Lepidoptera
- Family: Geometridae
- Genus: Gymnoscelis
- Species: G. chlorobapta

Binomial name
- Gymnoscelis chlorobapta Turner, 1907

Species of moth

Gymnoscelis chlorobapta is a 9 millimetres (0.35 in) long moth in the family Geometridae. It is found in Australia (Queensland).
