= Gymnoscelis aenictopa =

Scientific classification
- Domain: Eukaryota
- Kingdom: Animalia
- Phylum: Arthropoda
- Class: Insecta
- Order: Lepidoptera
- Family: Geometridae
- Genus: Gymnoscelis
- Species: G. aenictopa

Binomial name
- Gymnoscelis aenictopa Turner ,1907

Species of moth

Gymnoscelis aenictopa is a moth in the family Geometridae. It is found in Australia (Queensland).
