= Gymnoscelis deleta =

Scientific classification
- Kingdom: Animalia
- Phylum: Arthropoda
- Clade: Pancrustacea
- Class: Insecta
- Order: Lepidoptera
- Family: Geometridae
- Genus: Gymnoscelis
- Species: G. deleta

Binomial name
- Gymnoscelis deleta (Hampson, 1891)

Synonyms
- Eupithecia deleta Hampson, 1891

Species of moth

Gymnoscelis deleta is a moth in the family Geometridae. It is found in India, Korea, Japan, Taiwan and probably in Sri Lanka according to Hampson.

== Description ==
This moth has a fairly small wingspan, measuring roughly 20 to 26 millimeters (about 0.79 to 1.02 inches). Its body is a reddish-brown color that appears slightly faded, and it’s covered in tiny black speckles that look like they were lightly sprinkled on. On the forewings, you can see faint, wavy lines near the base and middle that angle downward toward the leading edge. In the middle section, there’s a barely noticeable wavy line outlined with dark marks, and the pattern shifts diagonally from the front edge toward the middle of the wing. Near the tip, a lighter patch stretches from the middle section all the way to the edge, with a smaller, less obvious pale spot right in the center. Along the outer edge, a dark, wavy line runs across, featuring a small black mark at the front edge and two thin black streaks just below the tip. The hindwings are more subdued, showing only faint wavy lines that mark different sections. One of these lines appears as a double line that angles sharply at a specific wing vein, with a yellowish-brown color spreading out beyond it, especially toward the inner part. There’s also a noticeable pale spot in the middle of the outer section. When viewed from below, the moth appears mostly dark gray or brown with scattered lighter patches. The same angled postmedial line is visible on both the forewings and hindwings, and a gently curved line runs along the outer edge. Overall, the patterns are subtle but follow a consistent, angled design that helps distinguish this species.
