= Gymnoscelis biangulata =

Scientific classification
- Domain: Eukaryota
- Kingdom: Animalia
- Phylum: Arthropoda
- Class: Insecta
- Order: Lepidoptera
- Family: Geometridae
- Genus: Gymnoscelis
- Species: G. biangulata

Binomial name
- Gymnoscelis biangulata C. Swinhoe, 1902

Species of moth

Gymnoscelis biangulata is a moth in the family Geometridae first described by Charles Swinhoe in 1902. It is found on Sumbawa in Indonesia.
