= Gymnoscelis boninensis =

Scientific classification
- Kingdom: Animalia
- Phylum: Arthropoda
- Class: Insecta
- Order: Lepidoptera
- Family: Geometridae
- Genus: Gymnoscelis
- Species: G. boninensis

Binomial name
- Gymnoscelis boninensis Inoue, 1994

Species of moth

Gymnoscelis boninensis is a moth in the family Geometridae. It is found in Japan.
