= Gymnoscelis acutipennis =

Scientific classification
- Domain: Eukaryota
- Kingdom: Animalia
- Phylum: Arthropoda
- Class: Insecta
- Order: Lepidoptera
- Family: Geometridae
- Genus: Gymnoscelis
- Species: G. acutipennis

Binomial name
- Gymnoscelis acutipennis Warren, 1902

Species of moth

Gymnoscelis acutipennis is a moth in the family Geometridae. It was described by William Warren in 1902. It is endemic to Kenya.

== Description ==
The species 26 millimetres (1.0 in) long with grey to green forewings. It have a very small basal patch and broad central fascia which is black in colour. Head, abdomen, and thorax are all pale green while the rings on the abdomen are black.
