= Gymnoscelis ectochloros =

Scientific classification
- Kingdom: Animalia
- Phylum: Arthropoda
- Class: Insecta
- Order: Lepidoptera
- Family: Geometridae
- Genus: Gymnoscelis
- Species: G. ectochloros

Binomial name
- Gymnoscelis ectochloros (Hampson, 1891)

Synonyms
- Eupithecia ectochloros Hampson, 1891

Species of moth

Gymnoscelis ectochloros is a moth in the family Geometridae. It was described by George Hampson in 1891. It is found in India and Sri Lanka according to Hampson.

== Description ==
Its wingspan is about 22 millimetres (0.87 in). The hind tibia lack a medial pair of spurs. Palpi reaching far beyond the frons. Forewings are of normal breadth. Male without thick tufts of laden-colored scaled at extremity of mid and hind tibia. Body olive green with black irrorations (speckles). Forewings with rufous broad medial area, irrorated or suffused with black and edges by waved black lines, which are angled on median nervure and vein 4. There is a pale waved submarginal line with rufous area, with a pale diffused patch at middle. Hindwings with rufous area extending to the base. Ventral side fuscous, with cell-spots and curved postmedial line. The green often fades and the moth appears to be rufous and ochreous in most of the time.
