= Gymnoscelis bryoscopa =

Scientific classification
- Kingdom: Animalia
- Phylum: Arthropoda
- Class: Insecta
- Order: Lepidoptera
- Family: Geometridae
- Genus: Gymnoscelis
- Species: G. bryoscopa

Binomial name
- Gymnoscelis bryoscopa (Meyrick, 1889)

Synonyms
- Dolerosceles bryoscopa Meyrick, 1889

Species of moth

Gymnoscelis bryoscopa is a moth in the family Geometridae. It is found in Papua New Guinea.
