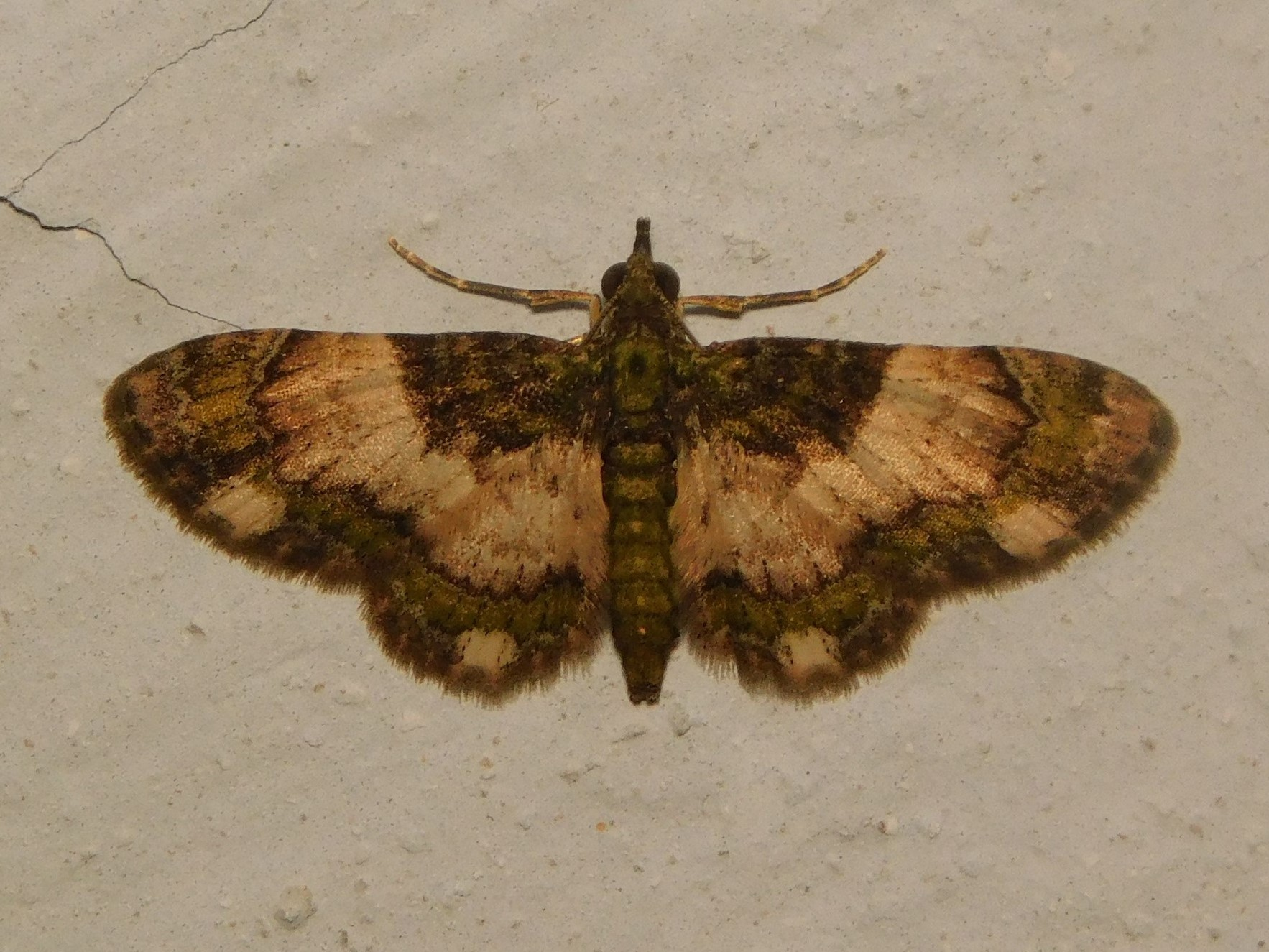

Scientific classification
- Kingdom: Animalia
- Phylum: Arthropoda
- Class: Insecta
- Order: Lepidoptera
- Family: Geometridae
- Genus: Gymnoscelis
- Species: G. roseifascia

Binomial name
- Gymnoscelis roseifascia (Hampson, 1893)

Synonyms
- Dolerosceles roseifascia Hampson, 1893

= Gymnoscelis roseifascia =

Species of moth

Gymnoscelis roseifascia is a moth in the family Geometridae. It is endemic to Sri Lanka.

== Description ==
Its wingspan is about 20 millimetres (0.79 in). In the male, the head, thorax, and abdomen are olive green, with slightly marked black color. Forewings with green basal half, mostly suffused with black in the form of diffused sub-basal and antemedial bands. Medial area is pale pinkish with two faint waved lines on it and bounded by a waved fuscous and grey line. The postmedial area green. A fuscous and grey waved submarginal line, and the area beyond it pinkish with a pale spot at middle. Hindwings similar. The pink area extending to the base and with a minute discocellular speck. The pale spot small. Ventral side fuscous, with curved postmedial line.
