= Gymnoscelis exangulata =

Scientific classification
- Domain: Eukaryota
- Kingdom: Animalia
- Phylum: Arthropoda
- Class: Insecta
- Order: Lepidoptera
- Family: Geometridae
- Genus: Gymnoscelis
- Species: G. exangulata

Binomial name
- Gymnoscelis exangulata (Warren, 1907)

Synonyms
- Chloroclystis exangulata Warren, 1907

Species of moth

Gymnoscelis exangulata is a moth in the family Geometridae. It is found on Seram, New Guinea and the Solomon Islands.
