= Gymnoscelis esakii =

Scientific classification
- Kingdom: Animalia
- Phylum: Arthropoda
- Class: Insecta
- Order: Lepidoptera
- Family: Geometridae
- Genus: Gymnoscelis
- Species: G. esakii

Binomial name
- Gymnoscelis esakii Inoue, 1955

Species of moth

Gymnoscelis esakii is a moth in the family Geometridae. It is found in Korea, Japan and Russia.
