= Gymnoscelis transapicalis =

Scientific classification
- Kingdom: Animalia
- Phylum: Arthropoda
- Clade: Pancrustacea
- Class: Insecta
- Order: Lepidoptera
- Family: Geometridae
- Genus: Gymnoscelis
- Species: G. transapicalis

Binomial name
- Gymnoscelis transapicalis Holloway, 1976

Species of moth

Gymnoscelis transapicalis is a moth in the family Geometridae. It is endemic to Borneo.

The wings are fawn with light, regular fasciation. The postmedial lines are strongly angled.
