= Gymnoscelis barbuti =

Scientific classification
- Domain: Eukaryota
- Kingdom: Animalia
- Phylum: Arthropoda
- Class: Insecta
- Order: Lepidoptera
- Family: Geometridae
- Genus: Gymnoscelis
- Species: G. barbuti

Binomial name
- Gymnoscelis barbuti Orhant, 2009

Species of moth

Gymnoscelis barbuti is a moth in the family Geometridae which is endemic to Tahiti.
