= Gymnoscelis distatica =

Scientific classification
- Kingdom: Animalia
- Phylum: Arthropoda
- Clade: Pancrustacea
- Class: Insecta
- Order: Lepidoptera
- Family: Geometridae
- Genus: Gymnoscelis
- Species: G. distatica

Binomial name
- Gymnoscelis distatica Prout, 1958

Species of moth

Gymnoscelis distatica is a moth in the family Geometridae. It is found in India.
