= Gymnoscelis tibialis =

Scientific classification
- Domain: Eukaryota
- Kingdom: Animalia
- Phylum: Arthropoda
- Class: Insecta
- Order: Lepidoptera
- Family: Geometridae
- Genus: Gymnoscelis
- Species: G. tibialis

Binomial name
- Gymnoscelis tibialis (Moore, 1887)

Synonyms
- Iramba tibialis Moore, 1887

Species of moth

Gymnoscelis tibialis is a moth in the family Geometridae. It was described by Frederic Moore in 1887. It is found in Sri Lanka and on Java.

== Description ==
Its wingspan is about 20 millimetres (0.79 in). Male with thick tufts of leaden-colored scales at extremity of mid and hind tibia. Body brownish olive. The medial area of forewings suffused with fuscous. The postmedial line of forewings straight and oblique from costa to the angle of vein 4.

The larvae have been recorded feeding on the flowers of Mangifera species.
