= Gymnoscelis lindbergi =

Scientific classification
- Domain: Eukaryota
- Kingdom: Animalia
- Phylum: Arthropoda
- Class: Insecta
- Order: Lepidoptera
- Family: Geometridae
- Genus: Gymnoscelis
- Species: G. lindbergi

Binomial name
- Gymnoscelis lindbergi Herbulot, 1957

Species of moth

Gymnoscelis lindbergi is a moth in the family Geometridae. It is found on Cape Verde.

The wingspan is 13–20 mm.
