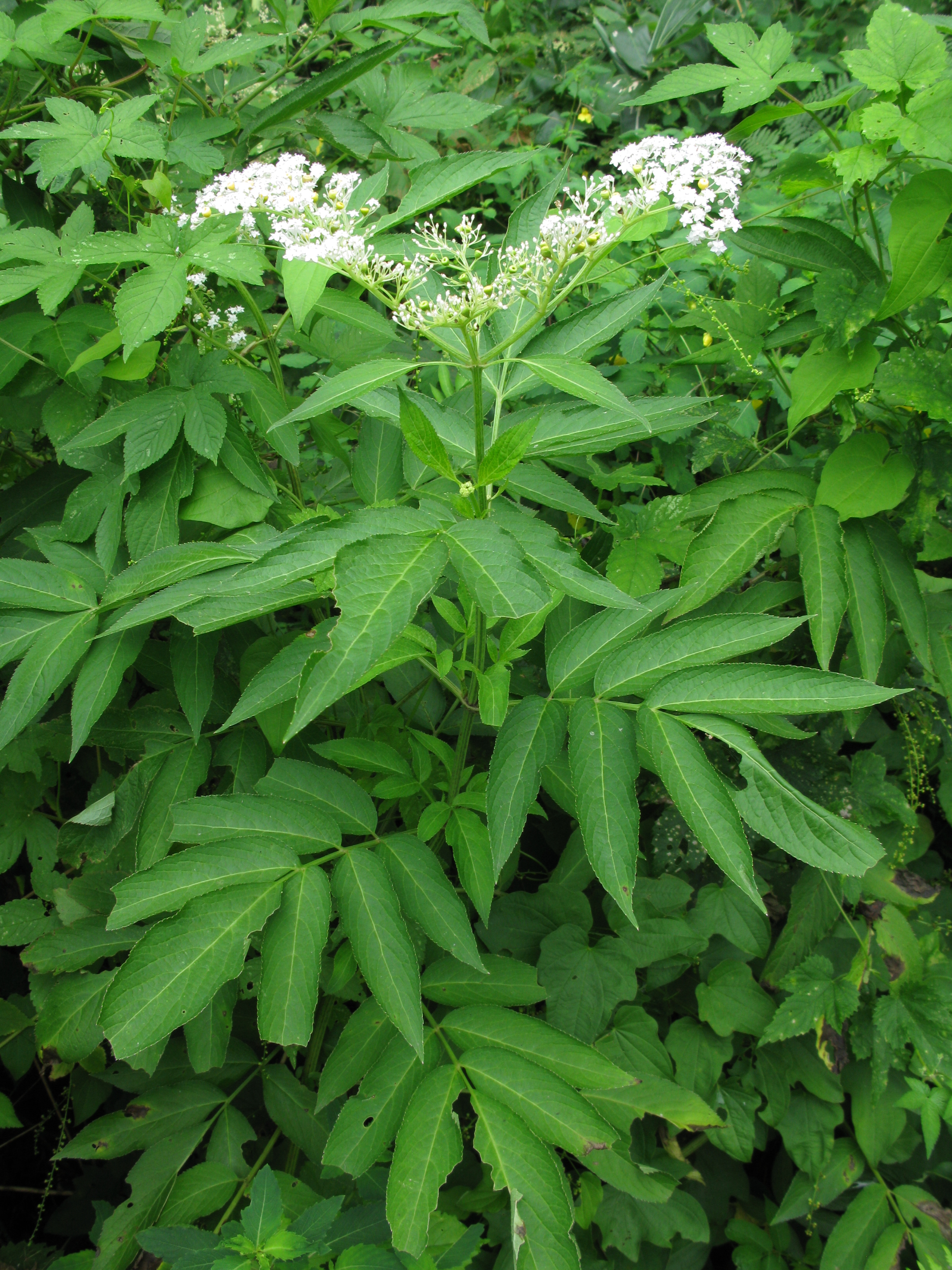
- Chinese elder

Conservation status
- Least Concern (IUCN 3.1)

Scientific classification
- Kingdom: Plantae
- Clade: Embryophytes
- Clade: Tracheophytes
- Clade: Spermatophytes
- Clade: Angiosperms
- Clade: Eudicots
- Clade: Asterids
- Order: Dipsacales
- Family: Viburnaceae
- Genus: Sambucus
- Species: S. javanica

Binomial name
- Sambucus javanica Reinw. ex Blume

Synonyms
- Sambucus chinensis Lindl.; S. c. var. formosana (Nakai) H.Hara; S. formosana Nakai; S. hookeri Rehder; S. javanica subsp. chinensis (Lindl.) Fukuoka

= Sambucus javanica =

Chinese elder

Species of plant

Sambucus javanica, the Chinese elder, is a species of elderberry in the family Viburnaceae native to subtropical and tropical Asia. It is native to Bhutan, Burma, Cambodia, China (except in the north), India, Indonesia, Taiwan, Japan, Laos, Malaysia (in Sabah), the Philippines, southern Thailand, and Vietnam. It is a perennial herb or a small shrub 1–2 m (3 ft 3 in – 6 ft 7 in) tall.

Parts of the plant are used as analgesics, blood purifiers, bowel and bladder stimulants, or even for poison. It is also believed to be an aid against numbness, rheumatism, spasms, swelling, and trauma, as well as for general bone and circulatory health.

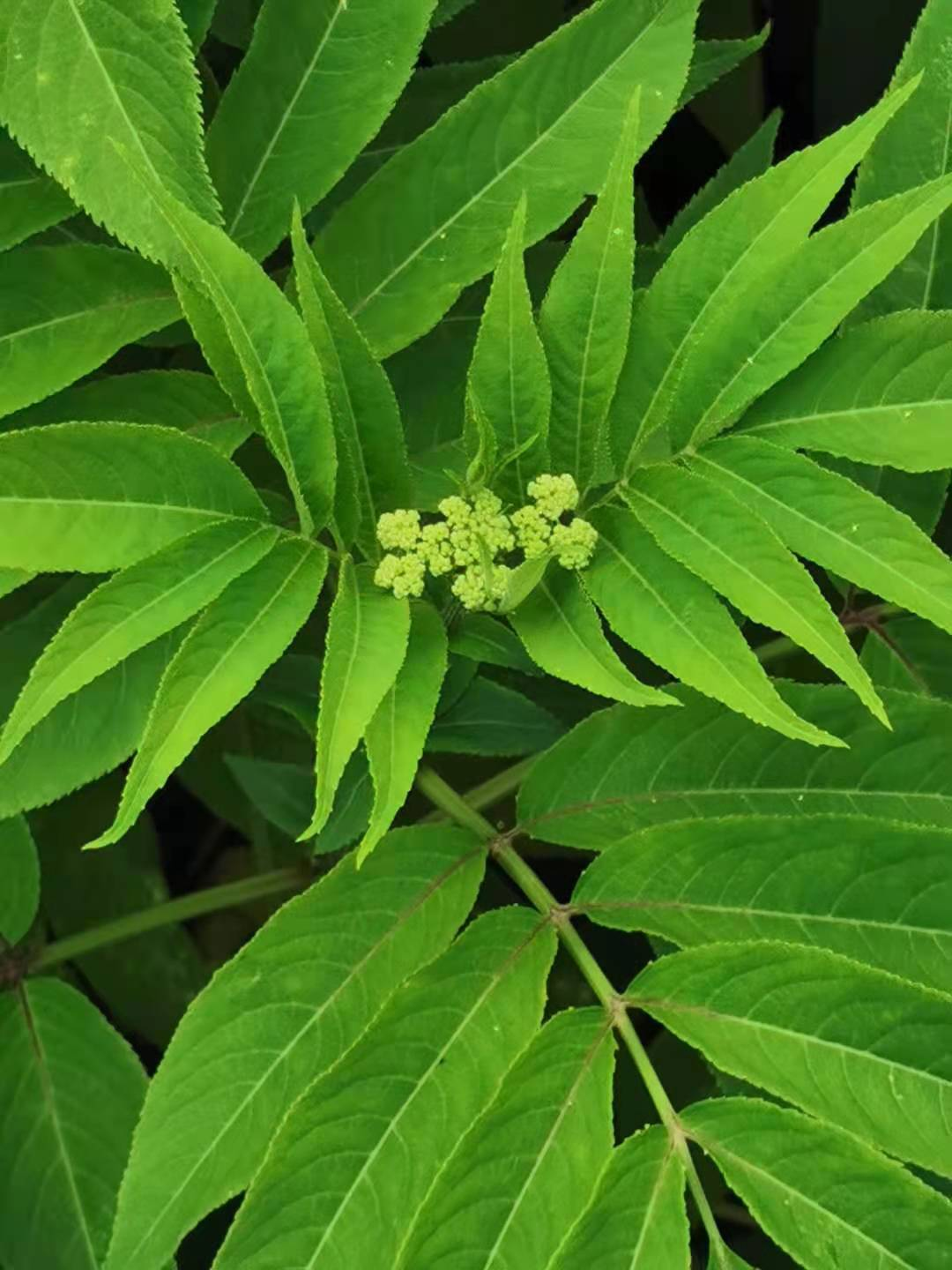
Leaves and phyllotaxy

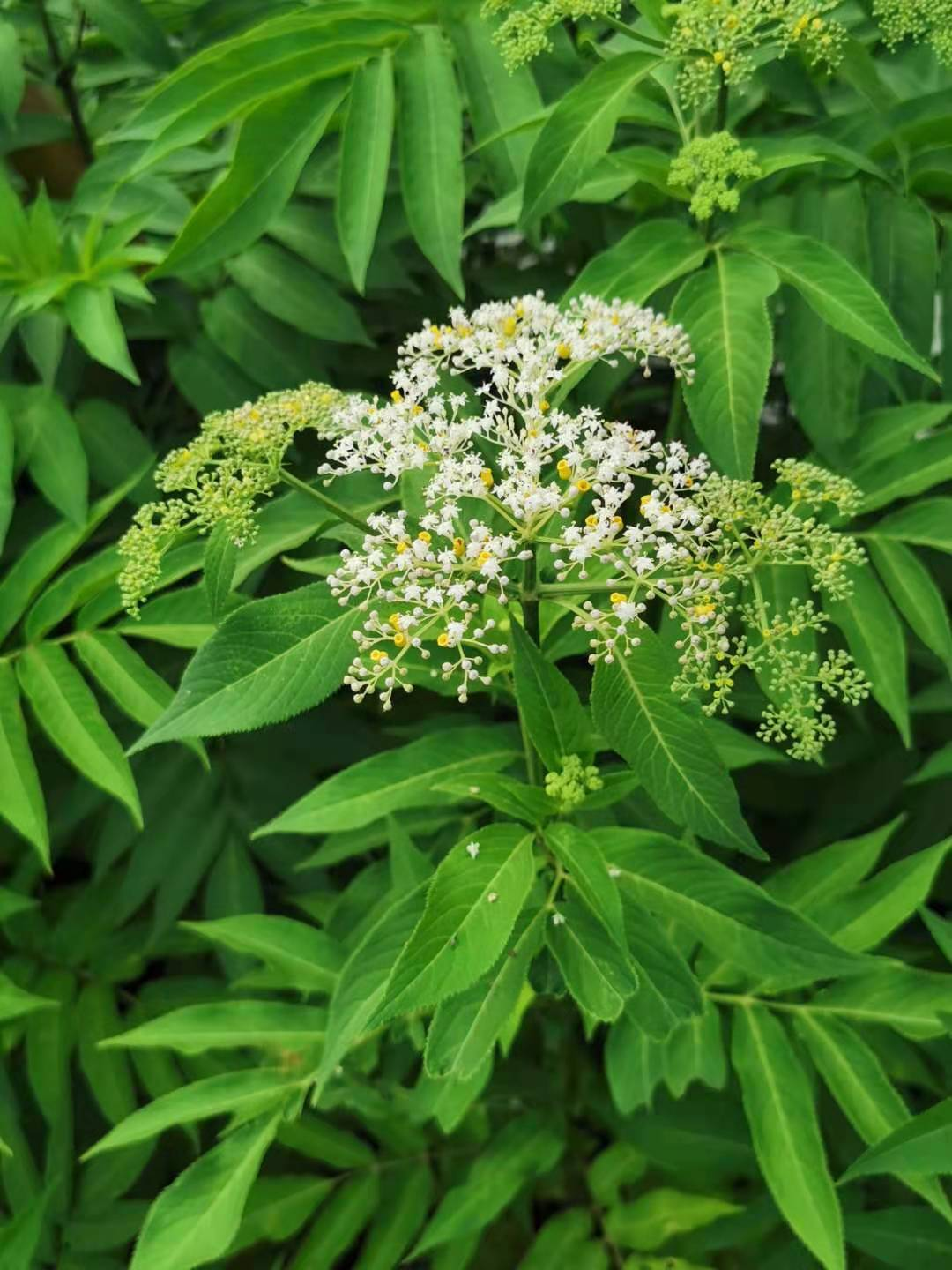
Terminal inflorescence.

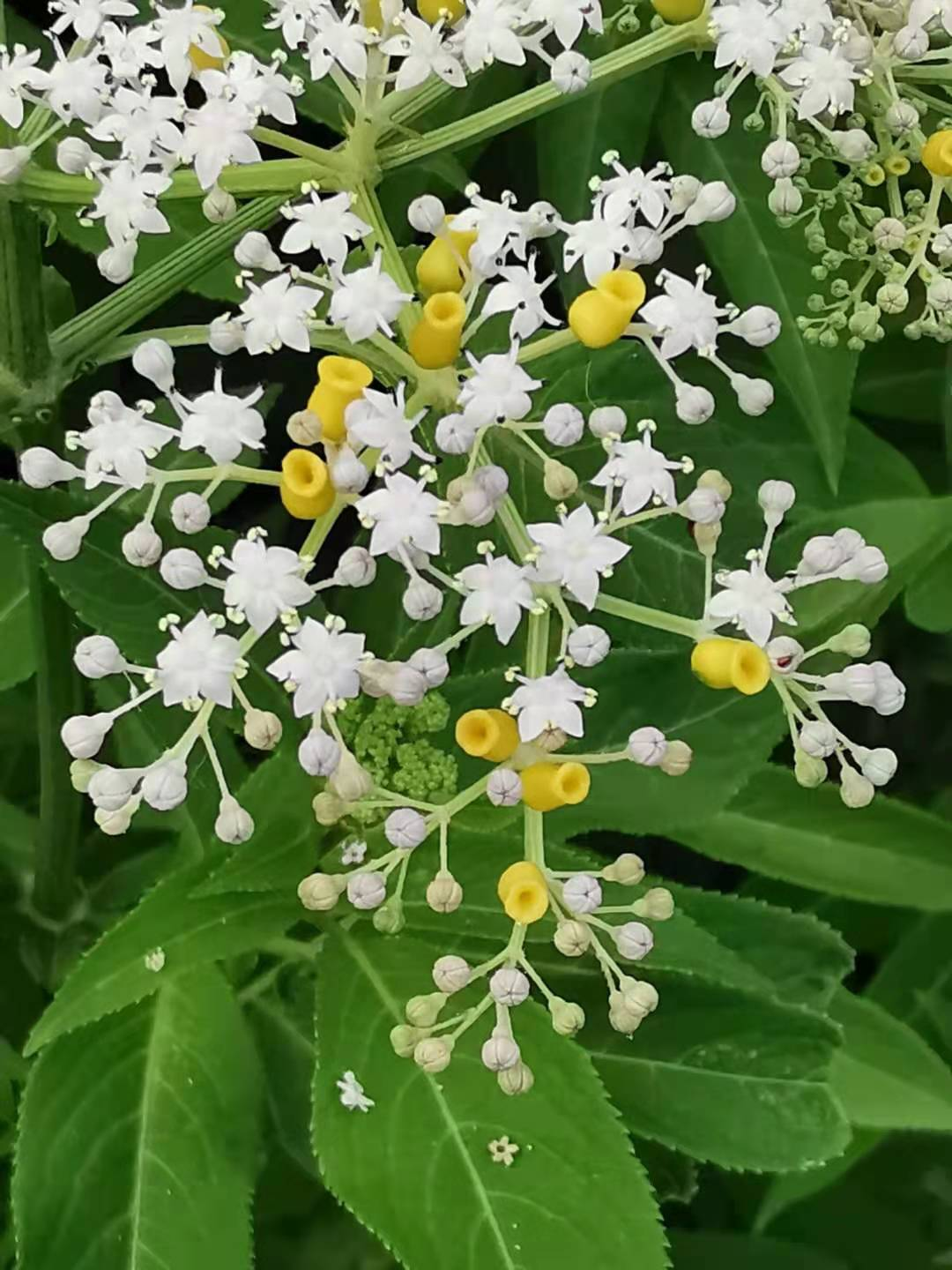
Yellow nectaries.

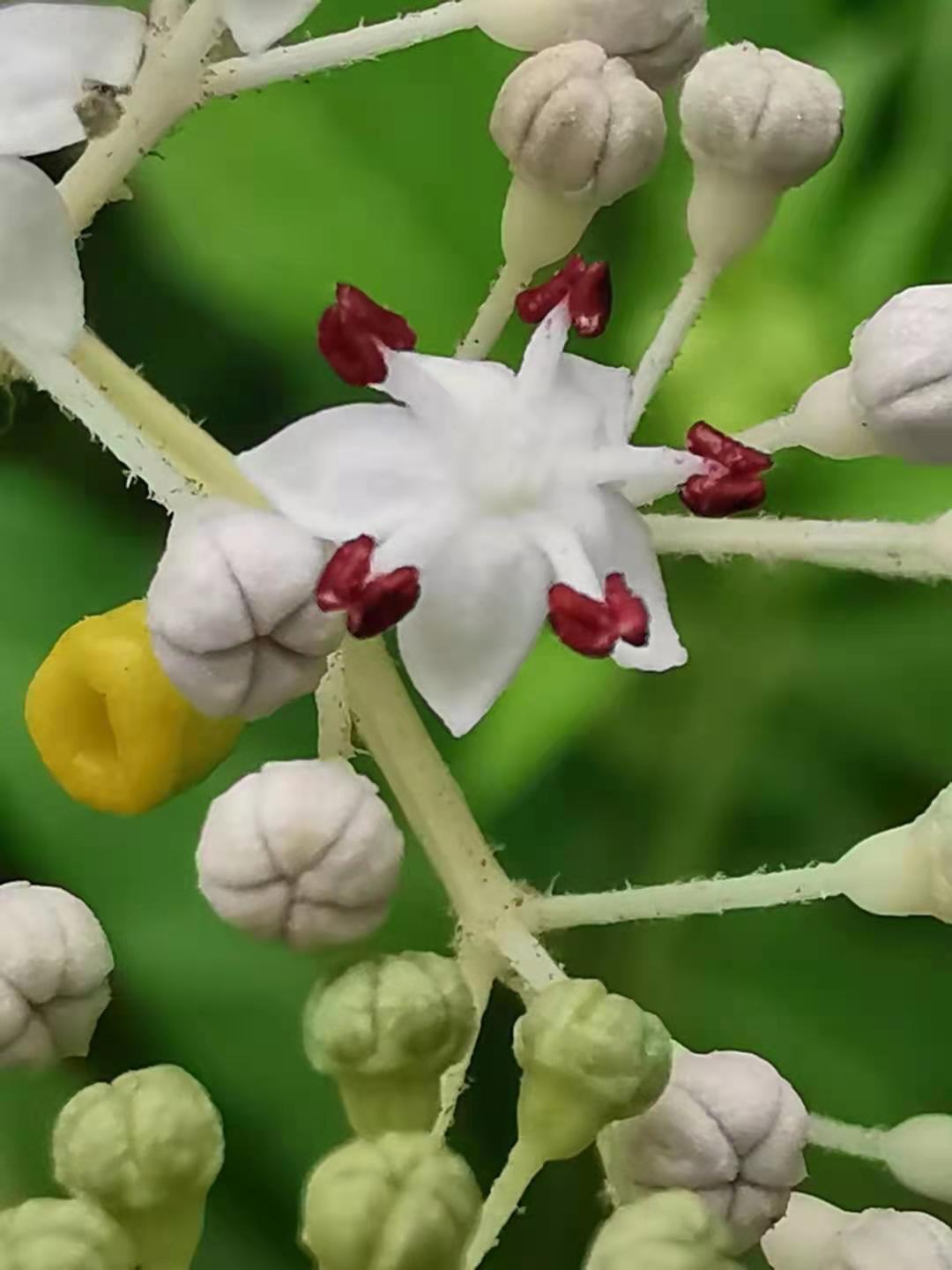
Flower, macro photography.
