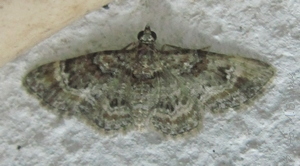

Scientific classification
- Domain: Eukaryota
- Kingdom: Animalia
- Phylum: Arthropoda
- Class: Insecta
- Order: Lepidoptera
- Family: Geometridae
- Tribe: Eupitheciini
- Genus: Gymnoscelis; Mabille, 1868

Synonyms
- Dolerosceles Meyrick, 1889; Iramba Moore, 1887

= Gymnoscelis =

Genus of moths

Gymnoscelis, the pugs, is a large genus of moths in the family Geometridae described by Paul Mabille in 1868.

== Description ==
Palpi porrect (extending forward), where the second joint clothed with hair and reaching beyond the frontal tuft. Third joint prominent. Antennae of male ciliated. Hind tibia with a terminal spur pair, and rarely with a very minute medial pair. Abdomen with slight dorsal crests. Forewings with vein 3 from close to angle of cell. Vein 5 from middle of discocellulars and vein 6 from upper angle. Veins 10 and 11 stalked, and vein 10 anastomosing (fusing) with veins 7 to 9 to form areole. Vein 11 anastomosing with vein 12 as well. Hindwings with veins 3 and 4 from angle of cell and vein 5 from middle of discocellulars. Veins 6 and 7 from upper angle and vein 8 anastomosing with vein 7 to beyond middle of cell.

== Species ==
- Gymnoscelis acutipennis
- Gymnoscelis admixtaria
- Gymnoscelis aenictopa
- Gymnoscelis albicaudata
- Gymnoscelis ammocyma
- Gymnoscelis anaxia
- Gymnoscelis argyropasta
- Gymnoscelis barbuti
- Gymnoscelis bassa
- Gymnoscelis biangulata
- Gymnoscelis birivulata
- Gymnoscelis boninensis
- Gymnoscelis bryodes
- Gymnoscelis bryoscopa
- Gymnoscelis caelestis
- Gymnoscelis callichlora
- Gymnoscelis carneata
- Gymnoscelis celaenephes
- Gymnoscelis celebensis
- Gymnoscelis chlorobapta
- Gymnoscelis concinna
- Gymnoscelis confusata
- Gymnoscelis conjurata
- Gymnoscelis coquina
- Gymnoscelis crassata
- Gymnoscelis crassifemur
- Gymnoscelis daniloi
- Gymnoscelis deleta
- Gymnoscelis delocyma
- Gymnoscelis derogata
- Gymnoscelis desiderata
- Gymnoscelis distatica
- Gymnoscelis ectochloros
- Gymnoscelis erymna
- Gymnoscelis esakii
- Gymnoscelis exangulata
- Gymnoscelis fasciata
- Gymnoscelis festiva
- Gymnoscelis fragilis
- Gymnoscelis grisea
- Gymnoscelis harterti
- Gymnoscelis holocapna
- Gymnoscelis holoprasia
- Gymnoscelis idiograpta
- Gymnoscelis imparatalis
- Gymnoscelis inexpressa
- Gymnoscelis ischnophylla
- Gymnoscelis kennii
- Gymnoscelis latipennis
- Gymnoscelis lavella
- Gymnoscelis lindbergi
- Gymnoscelis lophopus
- Gymnoscelis melaninfra
- Gymnoscelis merochyta
- Gymnoscelis mesophoena
- Gymnoscelis montgomeryi
- Gymnoscelis nepotalis
- Gymnoscelis nigrescens
- Gymnoscelis oblenita
- Gymnoscelis olsoufieffae
- Gymnoscelis oribiensis
- Gymnoscelis pallidirufa
- Gymnoscelis perpusilla
- Gymnoscelis phoenicopus
- Gymnoscelis poecilimon
- Gymnoscelis protracta
- Gymnoscelis prouti
- Gymnoscelis pseudotibialis
- Gymnoscelis roseifascia
- Gymnoscelis rubricata
- Gymnoscelis rufifasciata
- Gymnoscelis sara
- Gymnoscelis semialbida
- Gymnoscelis silvicola
- Gymnoscelis smithersi
- Gymnoscelis spodias
- Gymnoscelis tanaoptila
- Gymnoscelis taprobanica
- Gymnoscelis tenera
- Gymnoscelis tibialis
- Gymnoscelis transapicalis
- Gymnoscelis tristrigosa
- Gymnoscelis tylocera
- Gymnoscelis yurikae
