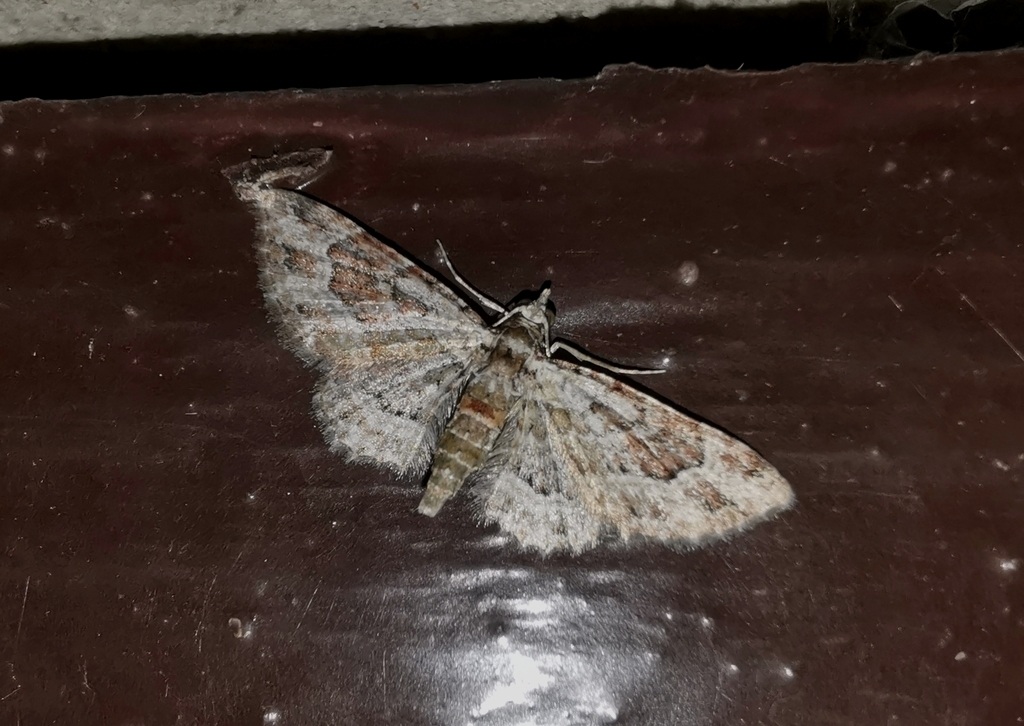

Scientific classification
- Kingdom: Animalia
- Phylum: Arthropoda
- Class: Insecta
- Order: Lepidoptera
- Family: Geometridae
- Genus: Gymnoscelis
- Species: G. imparatalis

Binomial name
- Gymnoscelis imparatalis (Walker, 1865)

Synonyms
- Botys imparatalis Walker, 1865; Eupithecia indicata Walker, 1866; Chloroclystis indicata; Chloroclystis semivinosa Warren, 1896; Gymnoscelis perangusta Warren, 1897; Gymnoscelis upolensis Rebel, 1915; Tephroclystia imperviata Swinhoe, 1900

= Gymnoscelis imparatalis =

Flower-looper moth

Species of moth

Gymnoscelis imparatalis, the flower-looper moth, is a moth in the family Geometridae. It is found from the Indo-Australian tropics of India, Sri Lanka, east to the Society Islands and the Marquesas Archipelago. The habitat consists of both lowland and montane ecosystems.

== Description ==
The wingspan is about 18 millimetres (0.71 in). Palpi with the second joint reaching slightly beyond the frons. Hindwings with vein 3 from angle of cell or shortly stalked at vein 4. Males lack secondary sexual characteristics on the wings. Adults are ochreous, suffused with dark brown and rufous. Wings with faint traces of waved lines. A double curved postmedial line is present, where the area beyond it is paler, with dark streaks on forewings below costa and on each side of vein 5, and patches at outer angle of forewings and apex of hindwings. There is a dentate submarginal line most prominent on hindwings.

The larvae have been recorded feeding on the young foliage and flowers of Mangifera, Tabernaemontana, Hodgsonia, Cinnamomum, Cassia, Fagraea, Memecylon, Pittosporaceae plants, Citrus and Nephelium species.

== Subspecies ==
- Gymnoscelis imparatalis imparatalis
- Gymnoscelis imparatalis opta Prout, 1958
- Gymnoscelis imparatalis upolensis Rebel, 1915
