= List of Lepidoptera of Cape Verde =

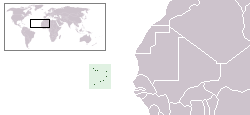
Location of Cape Verde

Lepidoptera of Cape Verde represent about 280 known species. A total of 252 moth species have been recorded. Twenty-six species of butterflies are known from Cape Verde, one of which is endemic. The moths (mostly nocturnal) and butterflies (mostly diurnal) together make up the taxonomic order Lepidoptera.

== Butterflies ==
=== Hesperiidae ===
- Borbo borbonica (Boisduval, 1833)
- Coeliades forestan (Stoll, 1782)

=== Lycaenidae ===
- Azanus jesous (Guérin, 1847)
- Azanus mirza (Plötz, 1880) (questionable)
- Azanus moriqua (Wallengren, 1857)
- Chilades evorae Libert, Baliteau & Baliteau, 2011
- Freyeria trochylus Freyer, 1845)
- Deudorix dinomenes Grose-Smith, 1887 (questionable)
- Euchrysops osiris (Hopffer, 1855)
- Lampides boeticus (Linnaeus, 1767)
- Leptotes pirithous (Linnaeus, 1767)
- Tarucus balkanica (Freyer, 1844))
- Zizeeria knysna (Trimen, 1862)

=== Nymphalidae ===
- Byblia ilithyia (Drury, 1773)
- Danaus chrysippus (Cramer, 1777)
- Nymphalis polychloros (Linnaeus, 1758)
- Hypolimnas misippus (Linnaeus, 1764)
- Junonia oenone (Linnaeus, 1758)
- Vanessa atalanta (Linnaeus, 1758)
- Vanessa vulcania (Godart, 1819)
- Vanessa cardui (Linnaeus, 1758)

=== Papilionidae ===
- Papilio demodocus Esper, 1798

=== Pieridae ===
- Belenois creona (Cramer, 1776) (questionable)
- Catopsilia florella (Fabricius, 1775)
- Colias croceus (Geoffroy in Fourcroy, 1785)
- Colotis amata (Fabricius, 1775) (questionable)
- Colotis euippe (Linnaeus, 1758) (questionable)
- Eurema brigitta (Cramer, 1780)
- Eurema floricola (Boisduval, 1833) (questionable)
- Eurema hecabe (Linnaeus, 1758)
- Eurema senegalensis (Boisduval, 1836) (questionable)
- Pontia daplidice (Linnaeus, 1758)
- Pontia glauconome Klug, 1829

=== Satyrinae ===
- Melanitis leda (Linnaeus, 1758)

== Moths ==
=== Bedelliidae ===
- Bedellia somnulentella (Zeller, 1847)

=== Coleophoridae ===
- Coleophora creola Baldizzone & van der Wolf, 2015

=== Cosmopterigidae ===
- Anatrachyntis simplex (Walsingham, 1891)
- Cosmopterix attenuatella (Walker, 1864)

=== Crambidae ===
- Achyra coelatalis (Walker, 1859)
- Achyra nudalis (Hübner, 1796)
- Cataonia mauritanica Amsel, 1953
- Condylorrhiza zyphalis (Viette, 1958)
- Cornifrons ulceratalis Lederer, 1858
- Cynaeda dentalis (Denis & Schiffermüller, 1775)
- Diaphania indica (Saunders, 1851)
- Duponchelia fovealis Zeller, 1847
- Euclasta insularis Viette, 1958
- Eudonia fogoalis Derra, 2008
- Eudonia lindbergalis Viette, 1958
- Hellula undalis (Fabricius, 1781)
- Herpetogramma licarsisalis (Walker, 1859)
- Hydriris ornatalis (Duponchel, 1832)
- Cnaphalocrocis poeyalis (Boisduval, 1833)
- Maruca vitrata (Fabricius, 1787)
- Nomophila noctuella (Denis & Schiffermüller, 1775
- Notarcha quaternalis (Zeller, 1852)
- Omiodes indicata (Fabricius, 1775)
- Orphanostigma abruptalis (Walker, 1859)
- Palpita vitrealis (Rossi, 1794)
- Pediasia strenua Bassi, 1992
- Spoladea recurvalis (Fabricius, 1775)
- Udea ferrugalis (Hübner, 1796)

=== Depressariidae ===
- Ethmia quadrinotella (Mann, 1861)

=== Erebidae ===
- Acantholipes aurea Berio, 1966
- Acantholipes trimeni Felder & Rogenhofer, 1875
- Achaea finita (Guenée, 1852)
- Achaea infinita (Guenée, 1852)
- Achaea violaceofascia (Saalmüller, 1891)
- Anomis auragoides (Guenée, 1852)
- Anomis flava (Fabricius, 1775)
- Anticarsia rubricans (Boisduval, 1833)
- Asota speciosa (Drury, 1773)
- Audea melaleuca Walker, 1865
- Crypsotidia maculifera (Staudinger, 1898)
- Crypsotidia mesosema Hampson, 1913
- Crypsotidia remanei Wiltshire, 1977
- Dysgonia algira (Linnaeus, 1767)
- Dysgonia angularis (Boisduval, 1833)
- Dysgonia torrida (Guenée, 1852)
- Eilema aistleitneri Cerny, 2013
- Ericeia congregata (Walker, 1858)
- Ericeia inangulata (Guenée, 1852)
- Eublemma apicimacula (Mabille, 1880)
- Eublemma baccatrix Hacker, 2019
- Eublemma cochylioides (Guenée, 1852)
- Eublemma ecthaemata Hampson, 1896
- Eublemma exigua (Walker, 1858)
- Eublemma gayneri (Rothschild, 1901)
- Eublemma mesophaea Hampson, 1910
- Eublemma parva (Hübner, 1808)
- Eublemma scitula (Rambur, 1833)
- Eublemma spirogramma Rebel, 1912
- Gesoniodes nigripalpa (Wiltshire, 1977)
- Gnamptonyx innexa (Walker, 1858)
- Grammodes congenita Walker, 1858
- Grammodes exclusiva Pagenstecher, 1907
- Grammodes stolida (Fabricius, 1775)
- Hipoepa fractalis (Guenée, 1854)
- Hypena abyssinialis Guenée, 1854
- Hypena conscitalis Walker, 1866
- Hypena laceratalis Walker, 1859
- Hypena lividalis (Hübner, 1790)
- Hypena semilutea (Snellen, 1872)
- Hypena strigatus (Fabricius, 1798)
- Hypena varialis Walker, 1866
- Janseodes melanospila (Guenée, 1852)
- Lygephila pastinum (Treitschke, 1826)
- Maxera marchalii (Boisduval, 1833)
- Maxera nigriceps (Walker, 1858)
- Mesogenea varians Hampson, 1902
- Mocis conveniens (Walker, 1858)
- Mocis mayeri (Boisduval, 1833)
- Mocis proverai Zilli, 2000
- Nodaria externalis Guenée, 1854
- Ophiusa tirhaca (Cramer, 1777)
- Oraesia intrusa (Krüger, 1939)
- Pandesma robusta (Walker, 1858)
- Pericyma mendax (Walker, 1858)
- Phytometra melanosticta Hacker, 2016
- Polydesma umbricola Boisduval, 1833
- Serrodes partita (Fabricius, 1775)
- Simplicia extinctalis (Zeller, 1852)
- Sphingomorpha chlorea (Cramer, 1777)
- Tathorhynchus exsiccata (Lederer, 1855)
- Tathorhynchus leucobasis Bethune-Baker, 1911
- Tathorhynchus troberti (Guenée, 1852)
- Trigonodes hyppasia (Cramer, 1779)
- Ulotrichopus primulina (Hampson, 1902)
- Utetheisa pulchella (Linnaeus, 1758)

=== Gelechiidae ===
- Anarsia balioneura Meyrick, 1921
- Aristotelia benedenii (Weyenbergh, 1873)
- Brachmia convolvuli (Walsingham, 1907)
- Helcystogramma lamprostoma (Zeller, 1847)
- Ornativalva heluanensis (Debski, 1913)
- Pectinophora gossypiella (Saunders, 1844)
- Phthorimaea operculella (Zeller, 1873)
- Scrobipalpa aptatella (Walker, 1864)
- Zizyphia cleodorella Chrétien, 1908

=== Geometridae ===
- Chiasmia sudanata (Warren & Rothschild, 1905)
- Comibaena leucospilata (Walker, 1863)
- Comostolopsis stillata (Felder & Rogenhofer, 1875)
- Eucrostes beatificata (Walker, 1863)
- Eucrostes disparata Walker, 1861
- Gymnoscelis daniloi Hausmann, 2009
- Gymnoscelis lindbergi Herbulot, 1957
- Isturgia catalaunaria (Guenée, 1858)
- Isturgia deerraria (Walker, 1861)
- Mesocolpia nanula (Mabille, 1900)
- Microloxia aistleitneri Hausmann, 2009
- Microloxia herbaria (Hübner, 1818)
- Microloxia ruficornis Warren, 1897
- Orthonama obstipata (Fabricius, 1794)
- Pasiphila derasata (Bastelberger, 1905)
- Phaiogramma faustinata (Millière, 1868)
- Pingasa hypoleucaria (Guenée, 1862)
- Pingasa lahayei (Oberthür, 1887)
- Pingasa rhadamaria (Guenée, 1858)
- Prasinocyma germinaria (Guenée, 1857)
- Scopula minorata (Boisduval, 1833)
- Scopula paneliusi Herbulot, 1957
- Scopula retracta (Hausmann, 2006)
- Thalassodes quadraria Guenée, 1858
- Traminda vividaria (Walker, 1861)

=== Gracillariidae ===
- Caloptilia soyella (van Deventer, 1904)
- Phodoryctis caerulea (Meyrick, 1912)

=== Noctuidae ===
- Acontia basifera Walker, 1857
- Acontia conifrons Aurivillius, 1879
- Acontia feae (Berio, 1937)
- Acontia gratiosa Wallengren, 1856
- Acontia imitatrix Wallengren, 1856
- Acontia insocia (Walker, 1858)
- Acontia opalinoides Guenée, 1852
- Adisura callima Bethune-Baker, 1911
- Agrotis aistleitneri Behounek & Speidel, 2009
- Agrotis ipsilon (Hufnagel, 1766)
- Agrotis segetum (Denis & Schiffermüller, 1775)
- Agrotis spinifera (Hübner, 1808)
- Agrotis subspinifera (Hampson, 1903)
- Agrotis trux (Hübner, 1824)
- Amyna axis Guenée, 1852
- Anarta trifolii (Hufnagel, 1766)
- Androlymnia clavata Hampson, 1910
- Asplenia melanodonta (Hampson, 1896)
- Athetis ochreosignata Aurivillius, 1910
- Athetis pigra (Guenée, 1852)
- Callopistria latreillei (Duponchel, 1827)
- Callopistria maillardi (Guenée, 1862)
- Caradrina clavipalpis (Scopoli, 1763)
- Caradrina flava Oberthür, 1876
- Chasmina tibialis (Fabricius, 1775)
- Chasmina vestae (Guenée, 1852)
- Chrysodeixis acuta (Walker, 1858)
- Chrysodeixis chalcites (Esper, 1798)
- Condica capensis (Guenée, 1852)
- Condica conducta (Walker, 1857)
- Condica pauperata (Walker, 1858)
- Cornutiplusia circumflexa (Linnaeus, 1767)
- Ctenoplusia limbirena (Guenée, 1852)
- Euxoa admirabilis Hacker & Schreier, 2010
- Euxoa canariensis Rebel, 1902
- Haplocestra similis Aurivillius, 1910
- Helicoverpa armigera (Hübner, 1808)
- Helicoverpa assulta (Guenée, 1852)
- Heliocheilus confertissima (Walker, 1865)
- Heliothis nubigera Herrich-Schäffer, 1851
- Heliothis peltigera (Denis & Schiffermüller, 1775)
- Hiccoda pluristriata (Berio, 1937)
- Iambiodes incerta (Rothschild, 1913)
- Leucania loreyi (Duponchel, 1827)
- Maliattha sahelica Hacker, 2016
- Maliattha signifera (Walker, 1857)
- Mythimna languida (Walker, 1858)
- Mythimna natalensis (Butler, 1875)
- Mythimna poliastis (Hampson, 1902)
- Mythimna umbrigera (Saalmüller, 1891)
- Mythimna vilis (Gaede, 1916)
- Oederemia simplivalva Hacker & Schreier, 2010
- Ozarba adducta Berio, 1940
- Ozarba exoplaga Berio, 1940
- Ozarba phlebitis Hampson, 1910
- Ozarba rubrivena Hampson, 1910
- Pardoxia graellsii (Feisthamel, 1837)
- Peridroma saucia (Hübner, 1808)
- Pseudozarba bipartita (Herrich-Schäffer, 1850)
- Pseudozarba expatriata (Hampson, 1914)
- Pseudozarba opella (Swinhoe, 1885)
- Saalmuellerana media (Walker, 1857)
- Sesamia calamistis Hampson, 1910
- Sesamia nonagrioides (Lefèbvre, 1827)
- Spodoptera exempta (Walker, 1857)
- Spodoptera exigua (Hübner, 1808)
- Spodoptera littoralis (Boisduval, 1833)
- Thysanoplusia orichalcea (Fabricius, 1775)
- Trichoplusia ni (Hübner, 1803)
- Vittaplusia vittata (Wallengren, 1856)
- Xanthodes albago (Fabricius, 1794)

=== Nolidae ===
- Earias biplaga Walker, 1866
- Earias cupreoviridis (Walker, 1862)
- Earias insulana (Boisduval, 1833)
- Pardasena virgulana (Mabille, 1880)

=== Plutellidae ===
- Plutella xylostella (Linnaeus, 1758)

=== Praydidae ===
- Prays citri (Millière, 1873)

=== Pterophoridae ===
- Agdistis bifurcatus Agenjo, 1952
- Agdistis notabilis Gielis & Karsholt, 2009
- Agdistis tamaricis (Zeller, 1847)
- Exelastis atomosa (Walsingham, 1885)
- Exelastis pumilio (Zeller, 1873)
- Hellinsia aistleitneri Arenberger, 2006
- Lantanophaga pusillidactylus (Walker, 1864)
- Megalorhipida leucodactylus (Fabricius, 1794)
- Sphenarches anisodactylus (Walker, 1864)
- Stenoptilodes taprobanes (Felder & Rogenhofer, 1875)

=== Pyralidae ===
- Cadra figulilella (Gregson, 1871)
- Corcyra cephalonica (Stainton, 1866)
- Cryptoblabes gnidiella (Millière, 1867)
- Ephestia elutella (Hübner, 1796)
- Etiella zinckenella (Treitschke, 1832)
- Galleria mellonella (Linnaeus, 1758)
- Phycita pachylepidella Hampson, 1896
- Plodia interpunctella (Hübner, 1813)
- Susia uberalis (Swinhoe, 1884)
- Thylacoptila paurosema Meyrick, 1885

=== Scythrididae ===
- Eretmocera basistrigata Walsingham, 1889
- Eretmocera laetissima Zeller, 1852
- Scythris fissurella Bengtsson, 1997

=== Sphingidae ===
- Acherontia atropos (Linnaeus, 1758)
- Agrius cingulata (Fabricius, 1775)
- Agrius convolvuli (Linnaeus, 1758)
- Basiothia medea (Fabricius, 1781)
- Daphnis nerii (Linnaeus, 1758)
- Hippotion celerio (Linnaeus, 1758)
- Hyles euphorbiae (Linnaeus, 1758)
- Hyles livornica (Esper, 1780)
- Hyles tithymali (Boisduval, 1834)
- Nephele accentifera (Palisot de Beauvois, 1821)

=== Tineidae ===
- Opogona sacchari (Bojer, 1856)

=== Tortricidae ===
- Ancylis lutescens Meyrick, 1912
- Coniostola stereoma (Meyrick, 1912)
- Cydia choleropa (Meyrick, 1913)
- Eccopsis praecedens Walsingham, 1897
- Eccopsis wahlbergiana Zeller, 1852
- Fulcrifera boavistae Razowski, 2015
- Strepsicrates rhothia (Meyrick, 1910)
- Thaumatotibia leucotreta (Meyrick, 1913)
