= List of gelechiid genera: Z =

The large moth family Gelechiidae contains the following genera:

- Zeempista
- Zelosyne
- Zizyphia
