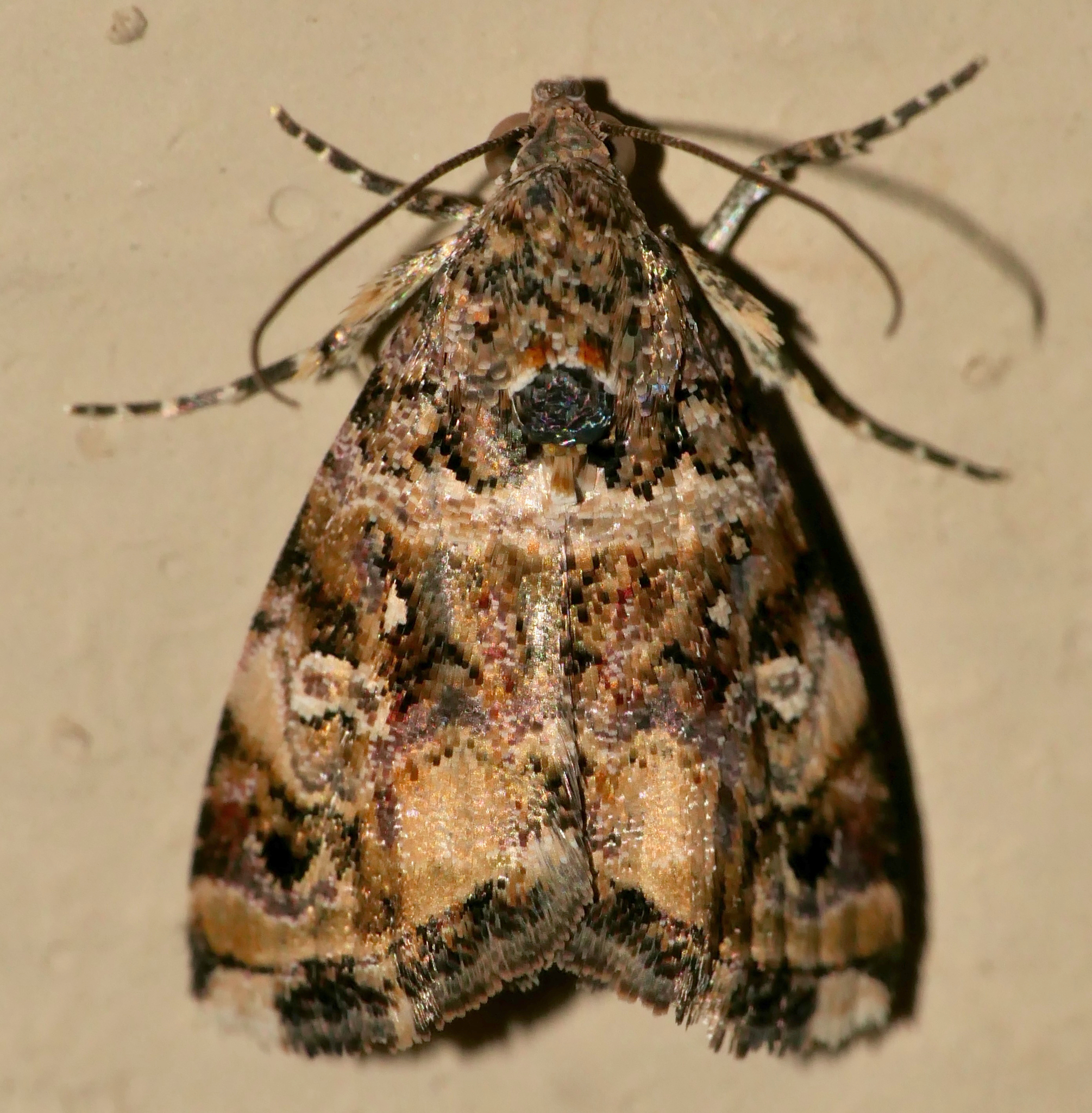
- Acontiola ruperti

Scientific classification
- Kingdom: Animalia
- Phylum: Arthropoda
- Class: Insecta
- Order: Lepidoptera
- Superfamily: Noctuoidea
- Family: Noctuidae
- Subfamily: Acontiinae
- Genus: Acontiola; Staudinger, 1900

Synonyms
- Neochrostis Hampson, 1902

= Acontiola =

Genus of moths

Acontiola is a genus of moths of the family Noctuidae. The genus was described by Staudinger in 1900.

It is considered by Butterflies and Moths of the World to be a synonym of Ozarba Walker, 1865.

== Species ==
- Acontiola acclivis (Felder & Rogenhofer, 1874) - South Africa, Namibia
- Acontiola binorbis (Hampson, 1910) - South Africa, Zimbabwe
- Acontiola boursini (Berio, 1940) - Somalia, Ethiopia
- Acontiola chryseiplaga (Hampson, 1910) - Zaire
- Acontiola cryptochrysea (Hampson, 1902) - Madagascar, Mozambique, South Africa
- Acontiola cyanopasta (Hampson, 1910) - South Africa, Namibia
- Acontiola densa (Walker, 1865) - South Africa, Namibia
- Acontiola diplogramma (Hampson, 1902) - South Africa
- Acontiola divisa (Gaede, 1916) - Tanzania
- Acontiola epimochla (Bethune-Baker, 1911) - Nigeria
- Acontiola festiva (Berio, 1950) South Africa
- Acontiola gobabis (Berio, 1940) - Zaire, ..., Namibia
- Acontiola heliastis (Hampson, 1902) - Arabia, Somalia, Eritrea, Ethiopia, Kenya, Uganda, Malawi, Tanzania, Botswana, Zambia, Zimbabwe, South Africa, Namibia, Gambia, Cameroon
- Acontiola hemichrysea (Hampson, 1910) - Zaire
- Acontiola hypoxantha (Wallengren, 1860) - Kenya, Uganda, Mozambique, Zimbabwe, South Africa, Namibia
- Acontiola implicata (Berio, 1940) - Tanzania, South Africa
- Acontiola incognita (Berio, 1954) - Madagascar
- Acontiola lascivalis (Lederer, 1855) - south-eastern Europe
- Acontiola metachrysea (Hampson, 1910) - Zimbabwe
- Acontiola moldavicola (Herrich-Schäffer, [1851]) - south-eastern Europe, Iraq
- Acontiola parvula (Berio, 1940) - Somalia, Ethiopia
- Acontiola punctithorax (Berio, 1940) - South Africa
- Acontiola rosescens (Hampson, 1910) - eastern Zaire, Uganda, Burundi, Kenya
- Acontiola ruperti Behounek & Speidel, 2015 - Zambia
- Acontiola sancta Staudinger, 1900 - Lebanon, Palestine, Iran, Arabia, Chad, Sudan, Somalia, Kenya, Tanzania, Namibia
- Acontiola separabilis (Berio, 1940) - Eritrea, South Africa
- Acontiola subterminalis (Hampson, 1910) - Kenya, Botswana, Zimbabwe, Zambia, South Africa
- Acontiola subtilimba (Berio, 1963) - Mauritania, eastern Zaire, Uganda, Kenya
- Acontiola varia (Walker, 1865) - Yemen, Kenya, Botswana, Zimbabwe, South Africa, Namibia, Angola
- Acontiola vultuosa (Distant, 1898) - Zimbabwe, Mozambique, South Africa
