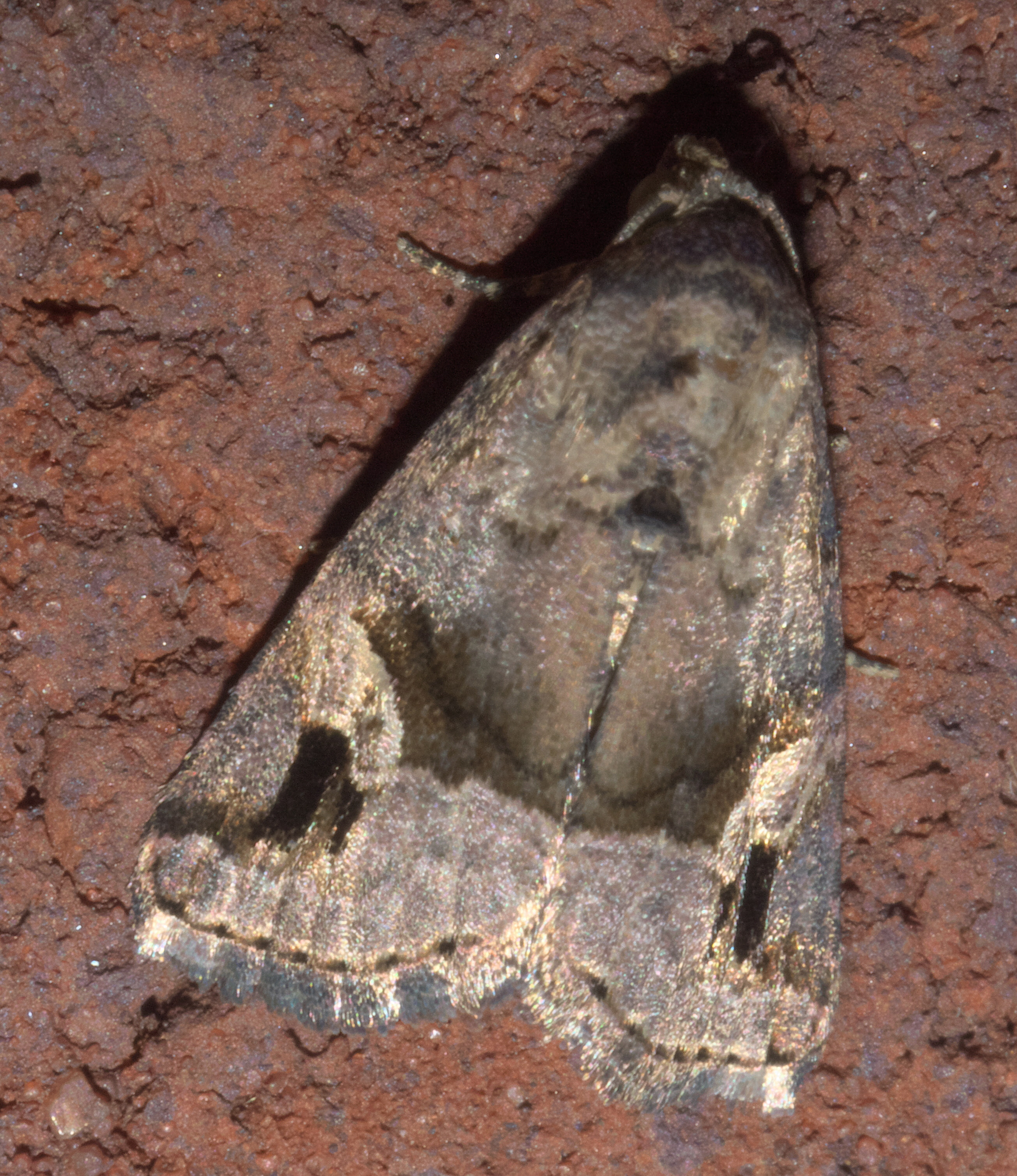

Scientific classification
- Domain: Eukaryota
- Kingdom: Animalia
- Phylum: Arthropoda
- Class: Insecta
- Order: Lepidoptera
- Superfamily: Noctuoidea
- Family: Noctuidae
- Genus: Ozarba
- Species: O. nebula

Binomial name
- Ozarba nebula Barnes & McDunnough, 1918

= Ozarba nebula =

Species of moth

Ozarba nebula is a species of moth in the family Noctuidae (the owlet moths). It was first described by William Barnes and James Halliday McDunnough in 1918 and it is found in North America.

The MONA or Hodges number for Ozarba nebula is 9033.
