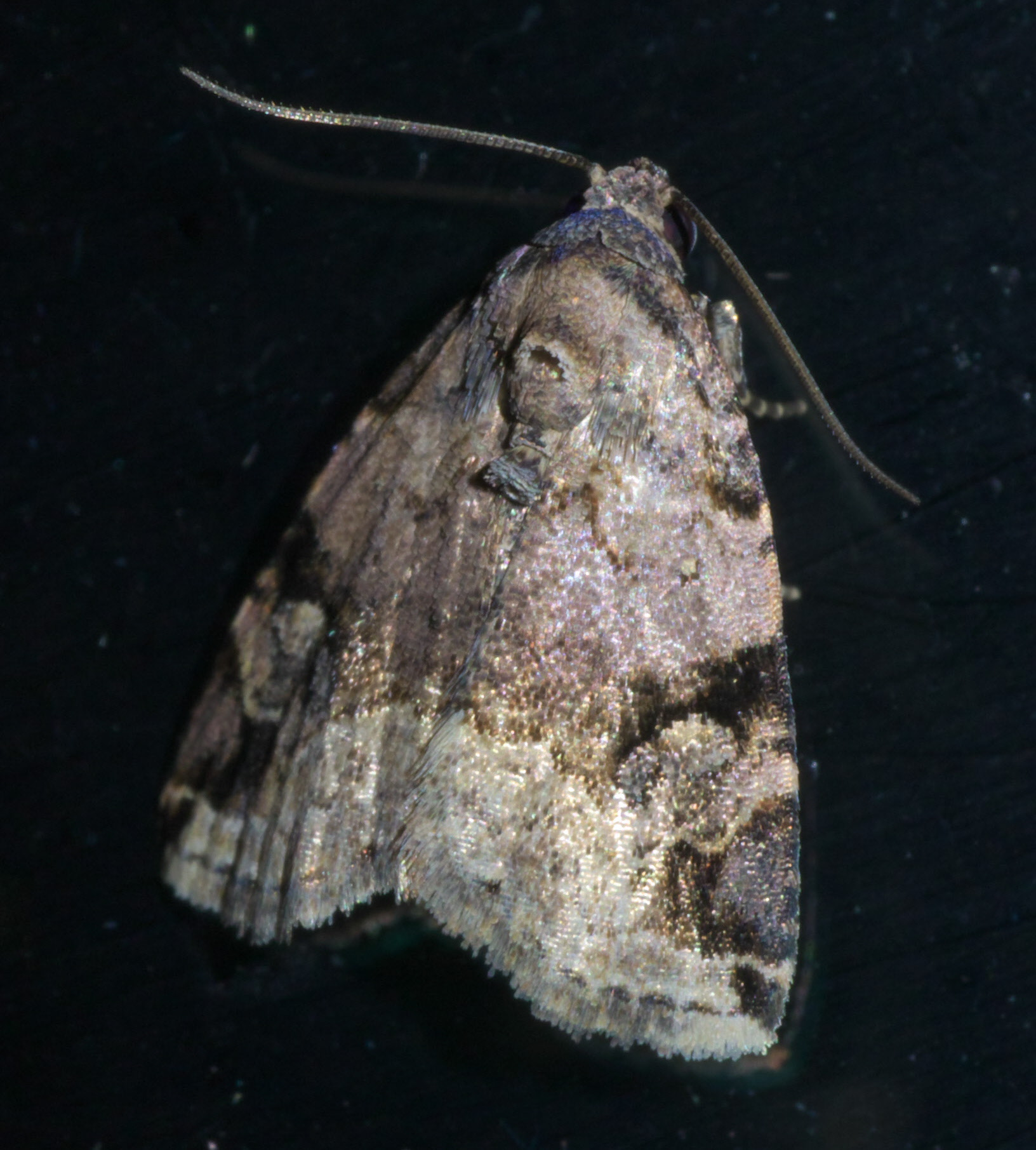

Scientific classification
- Kingdom: Animalia
- Phylum: Arthropoda
- Class: Insecta
- Order: Lepidoptera
- Superfamily: Noctuoidea
- Family: Noctuidae
- Genus: Ozarba
- Species: O. aeria

Binomial name
- Ozarba aeria (Grote, 1881)

Synonyms
- Ozarba fannia (H. Druce, 1889)

= Ozarba aeria =

Species of moth

Ozarba aeria, the aerial brown moth, is an owlet moth (family Noctuidae). The species was first described by Augustus Radcliffe Grote in 1881. It is found in Central and North America.

The MONA or Hodges number for Ozarba aeria is 9030.
