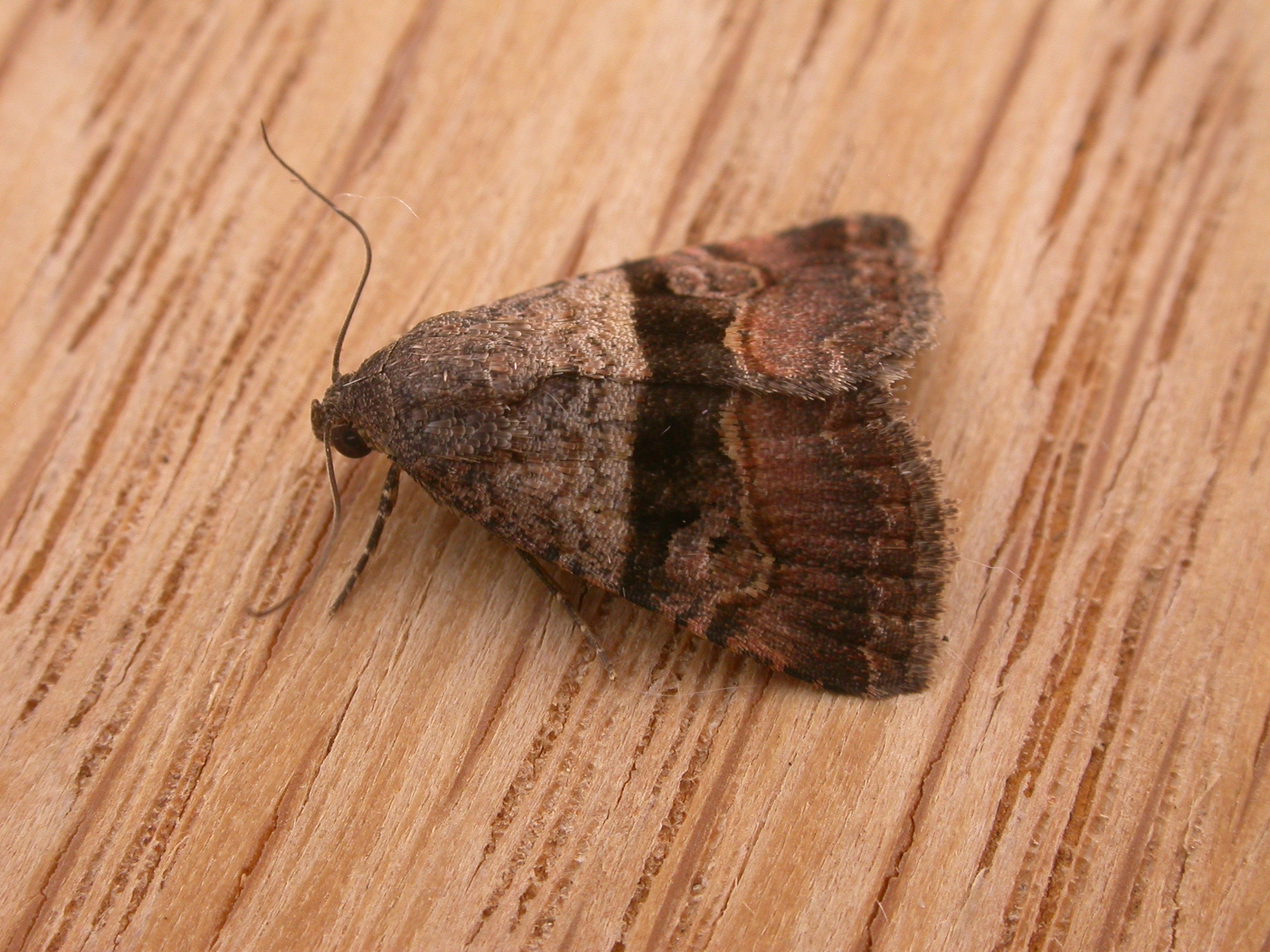

Scientific classification
- Kingdom: Animalia
- Phylum: Arthropoda
- Class: Insecta
- Order: Lepidoptera
- Superfamily: Noctuoidea
- Family: Noctuidae
- Genus: Ozarba
- Species: O. chrysaspis

Binomial name
- Ozarba chrysaspis (Meyrick, 1891)

Synonyms
- Thalpochares chrysaspis Meyrick, 1891; Metachrostis epichroma Turner, 1902

= Ozarba chrysaspis =

Species of moth

Ozarba chrysaspis is a moth of the family Noctuidae. It is found in the northern half of Australia, including Queensland.

Adults have forewings that have a pale brown area at the base and an orange-brown area at the margin, separated by a broad irregular black band. The hindwings are orange-brown with a broad dark margin.
