= Zelosyne poecilosoma =

Scientific classification
- Kingdom: Animalia
- Phylum: Arthropoda
- Class: Insecta
- Order: Lepidoptera
- Family: Gelechiidae
- Genus: Zelosyne
- Species: Z. poecilosoma

Binomial name
- Zelosyne poecilosoma Walsingham, 1911

Species of moth

Zelosyne poecilosoma is a moth in the family Gelechiidae. It was described by Thomas de Grey, 6th Baron Walsingham, in 1911. It is found in Panama.

The wingspan is about 10 mm. The forewings are shining white, with yellowish brown markings. A short basal patch, wider on the costa than on the dorsum, where it does not reach the flexus, is narrowly edged outwardly with blackish scales and a central fascia, also slightly wider on the costa than on the dorsum, is narrowly edged before and behind with blackish scales. A patch of the same yellowish brown colour covers the apical portion of the wing including the tornus, this is slightly produced backward on the costa, nearly reaching the outer edge of the central fascia. It is narrowly edged with black on its inner side, and along the costa, above the greatly depressed apex, is an elongate patch of black scales, more or less diffused inward across the fascia, and clearly defined by a black line on its outer side, where it is followed by a rather broad line of yellowish brown before the cilia which are brown, with a slender white line along their base, and contain a few blackish scales, especially below the apex. The hindwings and cilia are brownish grey.
