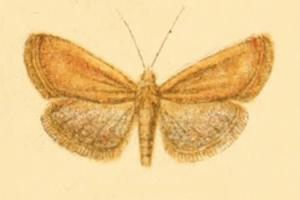

Scientific classification
- Domain: Eukaryota
- Kingdom: Animalia
- Phylum: Arthropoda
- Class: Insecta
- Order: Lepidoptera
- Family: Crambidae
- Subfamily: Odontiinae
- Tribe: Odontiini
- Genus: Cataonia
- Species: C. erubescens

Binomial name
- Cataonia erubescens (Christoph, 1877)

Synonyms
- Anthophilodes erubescens Christoph, 1877; Cataonia monocerialis Ragonot, 1891; Tegostoma mineti Vives Moreno, 2001

= Cataonia erubescens =

Species of moth

Cataonia erubescens is a species of moth in the family Crambidae. It is found in Spain, Greece, Turkey and Turkmenistan.
