= Crypsotidia inquirenda =

Scientific classification
- Kingdom: Animalia
- Phylum: Arthropoda
- Class: Insecta
- Order: Lepidoptera
- Superfamily: Noctuoidea
- Family: Erebidae
- Genus: Crypsotidia
- Species: C. inquirenda

Binomial name
- Crypsotidia inquirenda (Strand, 1909)

Synonyms
- Cremopalpus inquirendus Strand, 1909; Crypsotidia inquirendus

Species of moth

Crypsotidia inquirenda is a moth of the family Erebidae. It is found in Tanzania and Zambia.
