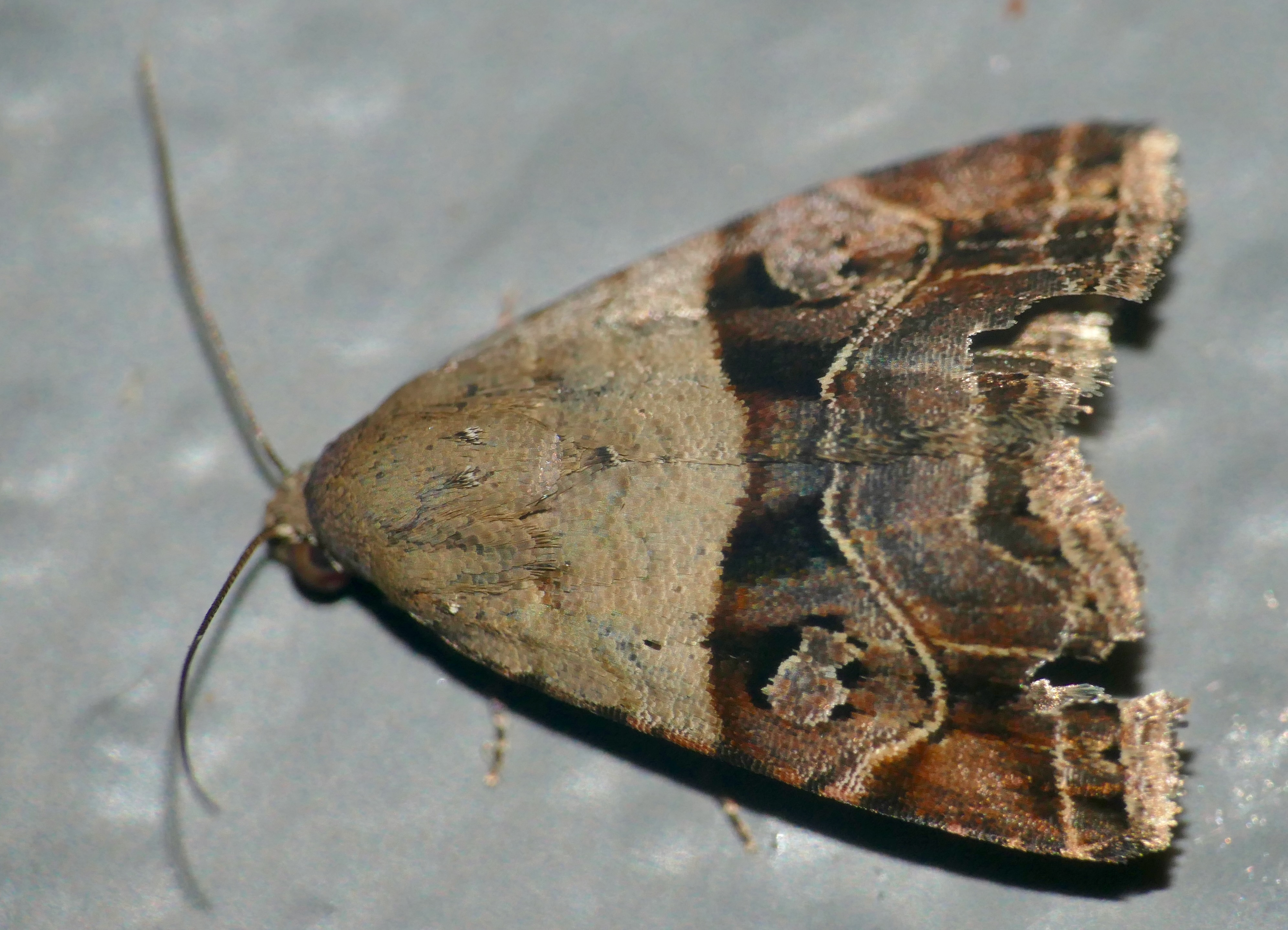

Scientific classification
- Kingdom: Animalia
- Phylum: Arthropoda
- Class: Insecta
- Order: Lepidoptera
- Superfamily: Noctuoidea
- Family: Noctuidae
- Genus: Ozarba
- Species: O. corniculans

Binomial name
- Ozarba corniculans (Wallengren, 1860)

Synonyms
- Erastria corniculans Wallengren, 1860; Erastria figurata Walker, 1865; Ozarba figurata (Walker, 1865)

= Ozarba corniculans =

Species of moth

Ozarba corniculans is a moth of the family Noctuidae. The species was first described by Hans Daniel Johan Wallengren in 1860. It is found in Kenya, Zimbabwe, South Africa and Madagascar.
