= Zizyphia zizyphella =

Scientific classification
- Domain: Eukaryota
- Kingdom: Animalia
- Phylum: Arthropoda
- Class: Insecta
- Order: Lepidoptera
- Family: Depressariidae
- Genus: Zizyphia
- Species: Z. zizyphella

Binomial name
- Zizyphia zizyphella Amsel, 1935

Species of moth

Zizyphia zizyphella is a moth in the family Gelechiidae. It was described by Hans Georg Amsel in 1935 and is found in Palestine.
