= Condylorrhiza epicapna =

Scientific classification
- Kingdom: Animalia
- Phylum: Arthropoda
- Class: Insecta
- Order: Lepidoptera
- Family: Crambidae
- Genus: Condylorrhiza
- Species: C. epicapna

Binomial name
- Condylorrhiza epicapna (Meyrick, 1933)

Synonyms
- Hedylepta epicapna Meyrick, 1933

Species of moth

Condylorrhiza epicapna is a moth in the family Crambidae. It was described by Edward Meyrick in 1933. It is found in the former West Kasai and Orientale provinces of the Democratic Republic of the Congo.
