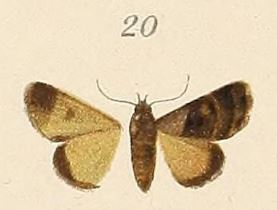

Scientific classification
- Kingdom: Animalia
- Phylum: Arthropoda
- Class: Insecta
- Order: Lepidoptera
- Superfamily: Noctuoidea
- Family: Noctuidae
- Genus: Ozarba
- Species: O. cryptochrysea

Binomial name
- Ozarba cryptochrysea (Hampson, 1902)

Synonyms
- Metachrostis cryptochrysea Hampson, 1902; Tarache centralis Pagenstecher, 1907

= Ozarba cryptochrysea =

Species of moth

Ozarba cryptochrysea is a moth of the family Noctuidae first described by George Hampson in 1902. It is found in Madagascar, Mozambique and South Africa.

It has an expansion of 22 mm (0.87 in).
