= Maxera bathyscia =

Scientific classification
- Kingdom: Animalia
- Phylum: Arthropoda
- Clade: Pancrustacea
- Class: Insecta
- Order: Lepidoptera
- Superfamily: Noctuoidea
- Family: Erebidae
- Genus: Maxera
- Species: M. bathyscia

Binomial name
- Maxera bathyscia D. S. Fletcher, 1961

Species of moth

Maxera bathyscia is a moth of the family Erebidae.

== Distribution ==
It is found in Africa, where it is found in the Democratic Republic of the Congo and Uganda.

This species has a wingspan of 30 mm.
