= Ozarba catilina =

Scientific classification
- Kingdom: Animalia
- Phylum: Arthropoda
- Clade: Pancrustacea
- Class: Insecta
- Order: Lepidoptera
- Superfamily: Noctuoidea
- Family: Noctuidae
- Genus: Ozarba
- Species: O. catilina

Binomial name
- Ozarba catilina H. Druce, 1889

Species of moth

Ozarba catilina is a moth in the family Noctuidae (owlet moths) described by Herbert Druce in 1889. It is found in North America.

The MONA or Hodges number for Ozarba catilina is 9032.
