= Crypsotidia longicosta =

Scientific classification
- Kingdom: Animalia
- Phylum: Arthropoda
- Class: Insecta
- Order: Lepidoptera
- Superfamily: Noctuoidea
- Family: Erebidae
- Genus: Crypsotidia
- Species: C. longicosta

Binomial name
- Crypsotidia longicosta Kühne, 2004

Species of moth

Crypsotidia longicosta is a moth of the family Erebidae. It is found in Angola, Malawi, Namibia and Tanzania.
