= Crypsotidia =

Scientific classification
- Kingdom: Animalia
- Phylum: Arthropoda
- Class: Insecta
- Order: Lepidoptera
- Superfamily: Noctuoidea
- Family: Erebidae
- Subfamily: Erebinae
- Tribe: Audeini
- Genus: Crypsotidia; Rothschild, 1901

Synonyms
- Cremopalpus Strand, 1909; Cryptotidia Hayward, 1926 (misspelling)

Genus of moths

Crypsotidia is a genus of moths in the family Erebidae.

== Species ==
- Crypsotidia bibrachiata Kühne, 2005
- Crypsotidia bullula Kühne, 2005
- Crypsotidia clytieformis Kühne, 2005
- Crypsotidia digitata Kühne, 2005
- Crypsotidia gigantea Kühne, 2005
- Crypsotidia inquirenda (Strand, 1909)
- Crypsotidia longicosta Kühne, 2004
- Crypsotidia maculifera (Staudinger, 1898) (Crypsotidia conifera Hampson, 1913)
- Crypsotidia mesosema Hampson, 1913 (syn: Crypsotidia griseola Rothschild, 1921)
- Crypsotidia piscicaudae Kühne, 2005
- Crypsotidia postfusca Kühne, 2005
- Crypsotidia remanei Wiltshire, 1977
- Crypsotidia wollastoni Rothschild, 1901 (syn: Crypsotidia voolastoni Hampson, 1913)

== Former species ==
- Crypsotidia glaucata Holland, 1897
- Crypsotidia maculata Tams, 1926
- Crypsotidia parva Rothschild 1921
