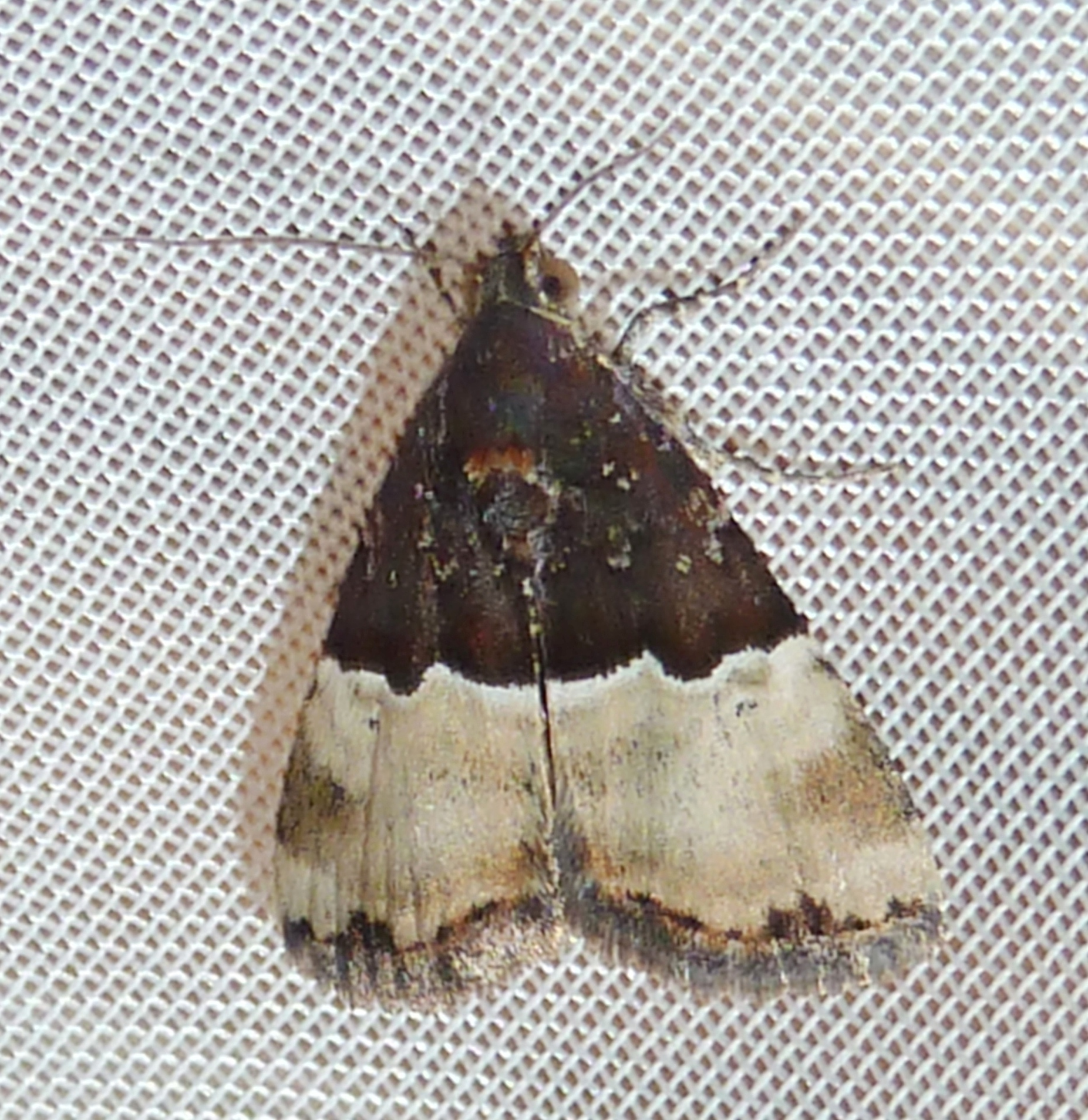

Scientific classification
- Kingdom: Animalia
- Phylum: Arthropoda
- Class: Insecta
- Order: Lepidoptera
- Superfamily: Noctuoidea
- Family: Noctuidae
- Genus: Ozarba
- Species: O. hemiochra

Binomial name
- Ozarba hemiochra Hampson, 1910

Synonyms
- Ozarba hemileuca Wiltshire, 1982

= Ozarba hemiochra =

Species of moth

Ozarba hemiochra is a moth of the family Noctuidae first described by George Hampson in 1910. It is found in South Africa.
