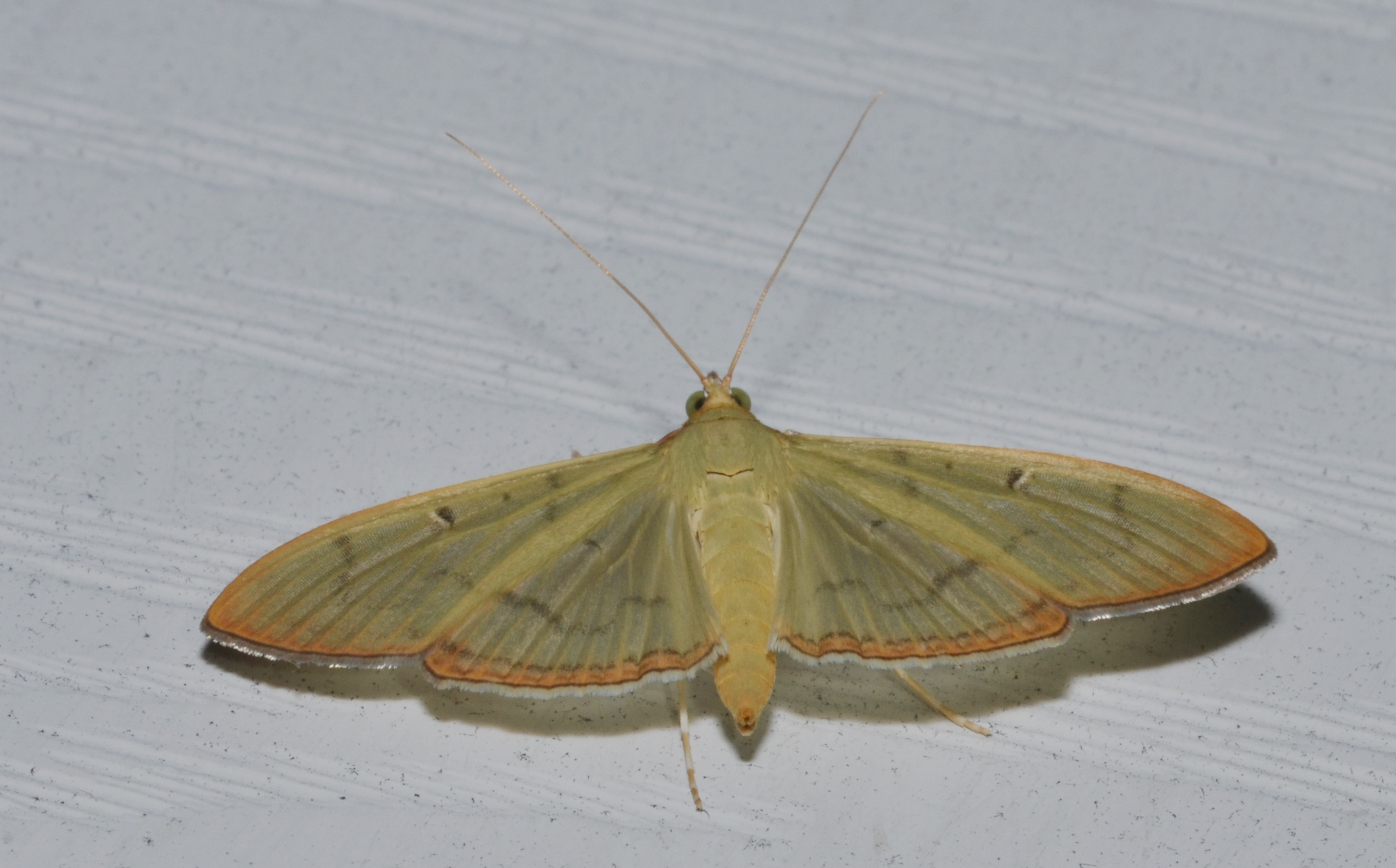

Scientific classification
- Kingdom: Animalia
- Phylum: Arthropoda
- Class: Insecta
- Order: Lepidoptera
- Family: Crambidae
- Genus: Condylorrhiza
- Species: C. vestigialis

Binomial name
- Condylorrhiza vestigialis (Guenée, 1854)

Synonyms
- Botyodes vestigalis Guenée, 1854; Botys tritealis Walker, 1859; Botys mestoralis Walker, 1859; Agathodes syleptalis Strand, 1920; Botys illutalis Guenée, 1854; Eudioptis oratalis Hulst, 1886

= Condylorrhiza vestigialis =

Species of moth

Condylorrhiza vestigialis, the Brazilian poplar moth or Alamo moth, is a species of moth of the family Crambidae described by Achille Guenée in 1854. It is found in North and South America.

== Food plants ==
The larvae feed on Populus species.
