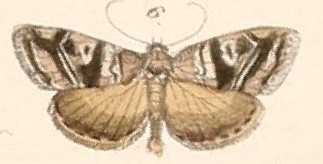

Scientific classification
- Kingdom: Animalia
- Phylum: Arthropoda
- Class: Insecta
- Order: Lepidoptera
- Superfamily: Noctuoidea
- Family: Noctuidae
- Genus: Ozarba
- Species: O. nyanza

Binomial name
- Ozarba nyanza (R. Felder & Rogenhofer, 1874)

Synonyms
- Erastria nyanza Felder & Rogenhofer, 1874

= Ozarba nyanza =

Species of moth

Ozarba nyanza is a moth of the family Noctuidae first described by Rudolf Felder and Alois Friedrich Rogenhofer in 1874. It is found Yemen, Saudi Arabia, Oman, Kenya, Madagascar and South Africa.
