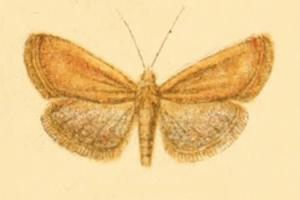
- Cataonia erubescens

Scientific classification
- Domain: Eukaryota
- Kingdom: Animalia
- Phylum: Arthropoda
- Class: Insecta
- Order: Lepidoptera
- Family: Crambidae
- Subfamily: Odontiinae
- Tribe: Odontiini
- Genus: Cataonia; Ragonot, 1891

= Cataonia (moth) =

Genus of moths

Cataonia is a genus of moths of the family Crambidae.

== Species ==
- Cataonia erubescens (Christoph, 1877)
- Cataonia mauritanica Amsel, 1953
