= Crypsotidia wollastoni =

Scientific classification
- Kingdom: Animalia
- Phylum: Arthropoda
- Class: Insecta
- Order: Lepidoptera
- Superfamily: Noctuoidea
- Family: Erebidae
- Genus: Crypsotidia
- Species: C. wollastoni

Binomial name
- Crypsotidia wollastoni Rothschild, 1901

Synonyms
- Crypsotidia voolastoni Hampson, 1913

Species of moth

Crypsotidia wollastoni is a moth of the family Erebidae. It is found in Egypt, Ethiopia, Mali, Niger, Nigeria and Sudan.
