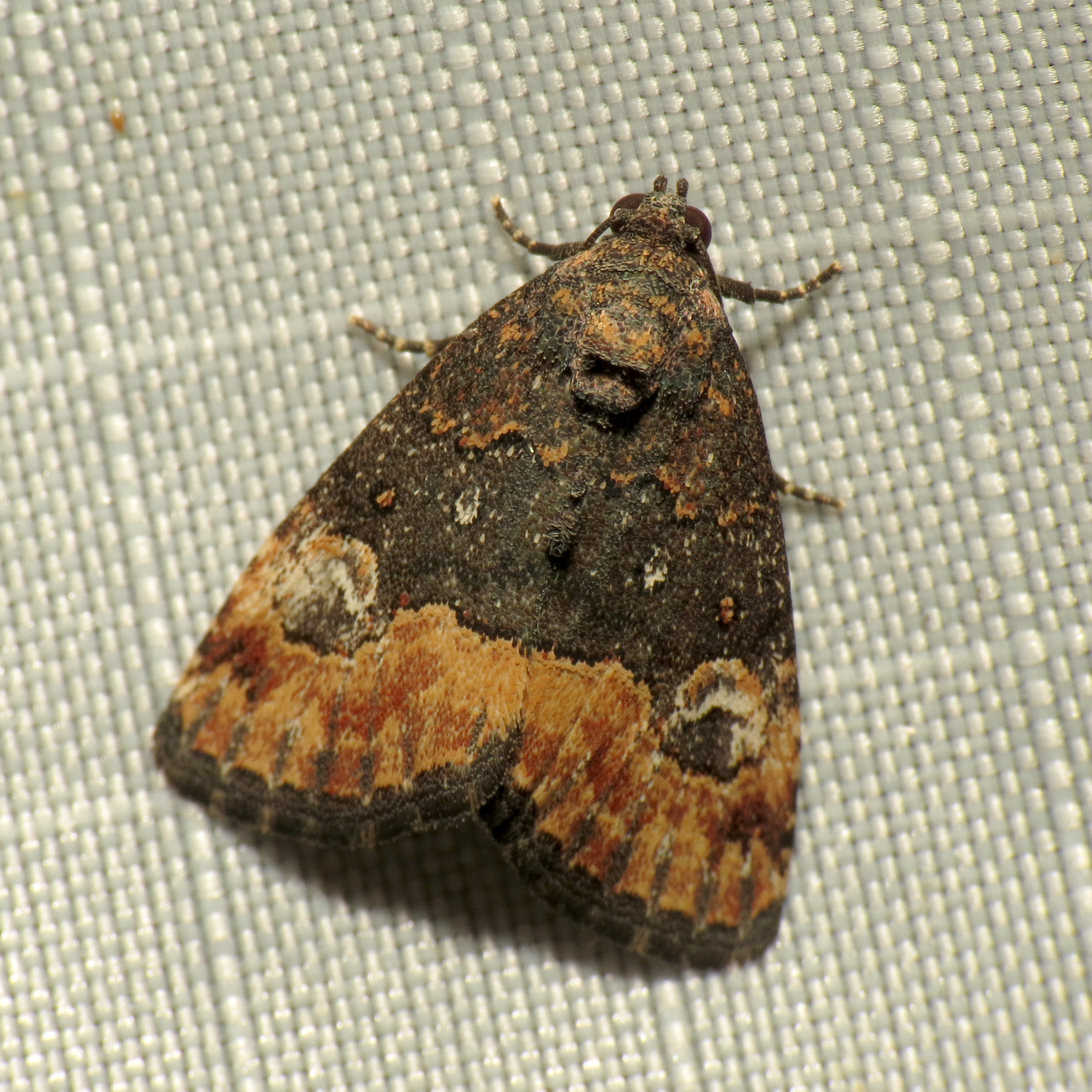

Scientific classification
- Kingdom: Animalia
- Phylum: Arthropoda
- Class: Insecta
- Order: Lepidoptera
- Superfamily: Noctuoidea
- Family: Noctuidae
- Genus: Ozarba
- Species: O. propera

Binomial name
- Ozarba propera (Grote, 1882)

= Ozarba propera =

Species of moth

Ozarba propera is an owlet moth (family Noctuidae). The species was first described by Augustus Radcliffe Grote in 1882.

The MONA or Hodges number for Ozarba propera is 9031.
