= Zelosyne olga =

Scientific classification
- Domain: Eukaryota
- Kingdom: Animalia
- Phylum: Arthropoda
- Class: Insecta
- Order: Lepidoptera
- Family: Gelechiidae
- Genus: Zelosyne
- Species: Z. olga

Binomial name
- Zelosyne olga Meyrick, 1915

Species of moth

Zelosyne olga is a moth in the family Gelechiidae. It was described by Edward Meyrick in 1915. It is found in Guyana.

The wingspan is 8–10 mm. The forewings are bronzy brown with two broad snow-white fasciae edged with black, the first extending on the dorsum from near the base to the middle, gradually narrowed upwards, the second at about two-thirds, narrowed on the costa, the anterior edge convex on the upper half, the posterior somewhat irregular. There is a suffused orange patch on the lower part of the termen and three or four dashes of blackish sprinkles on the veins above this, confluent on the apical margin. A fine oblique white strigula is found from the costa at three-fourths. The hindwings are grey, darker on the veins and towards the apex and termen, the basal half hyaline (glass like) except the veins and a streak through the middle of the cell.
