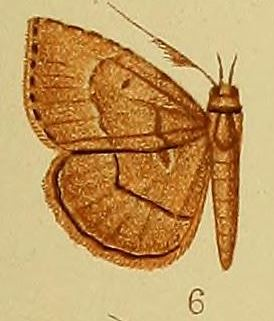
- Maxera lophocera

Scientific classification
- Kingdom: Animalia
- Phylum: Arthropoda
- Class: Insecta
- Order: Lepidoptera
- Superfamily: Noctuoidea
- Family: Erebidae
- Subfamily: Calpinae
- Genus: Maxera; Walker, 1865

Type species
- Maxera subocellata Walker, 1865

Synonyms
- Parathermes Hampson, 1902

= Maxera =

Genus of moths

Maxera is a genus of moths of the family Erebidae described by Francis Walker in 1865.

== Species ==
Some species of this genus are:

- Maxera arizanensis Wileman 1914
- Maxera atripunctata (Hampson, 1910)
- Maxera bathyscia D. S. Fletcher, 1961
- Maxera brachypecten Hampson, 1926
- Maxera brunneoasperus Griveaud & Viette, 1962
- Maxera digoniata (Hampson, 1902)
- Maxera discosticta Hampson 1897
- Maxera euryptera Hampson, 1926
- Maxera kanshireiensis
- Maxera inclusa (Strand, 1912)
- Maxera laportei (Viette, 1979)
- Maxera lophocera (Hampson, 1910)
- Maxera marchalii (Boisduval, 1833)
- Maxera nigriceps (Walker, 1858)
- Maxera nova (Viette, 1956)
- Maxera oblita Moore 1882
- Maxera pallidula (Butler, 1875)
- Maxera subocellata Walker, 1865
- Maxera zygia (Wallengren, 1863)
