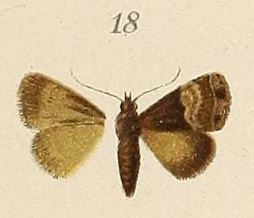

Scientific classification
- Kingdom: Animalia
- Phylum: Arthropoda
- Class: Insecta
- Order: Lepidoptera
- Superfamily: Noctuoidea
- Family: Noctuidae
- Genus: Ozarba
- Species: O. hemimelaena

Binomial name
- Ozarba hemimelaena Hampson, 1910

Synonyms
- Tarache transversa Pagenstecher, 1907 (invalid name); Aconzarba hemimelaena (Hampson, 1910)

= Ozarba hemimelaena =

Species of moth

Ozarba hemimelaena is a moth of the family Noctuidae. It is found Madagascar, Somalia, Zambia and Zimbabwe.
