= Condylorrhiza =

Scientific classification
- Kingdom: Animalia
- Phylum: Arthropoda
- Clade: Pancrustacea
- Class: Insecta
- Order: Lepidoptera
- Family: Crambidae
- Tribe: Margaroniini
- Genus: Condylorrhiza; Lederer, 1863

Genus of moths

Condylorrhiza is a genus of moths of the family Crambidae.

== Species ==
- Condylorrhiza epicapna (Meyrick, 1933)
- Condylorrhiza oculatalis (Möschler, 1890)
- Condylorrhiza vestigialis (Guenée, 1854)
- Condylorrhiza zyphalis (Viette, 1958)
