= Crypsotidia bullula =

Scientific classification
- Kingdom: Animalia
- Phylum: Arthropoda
- Class: Insecta
- Order: Lepidoptera
- Superfamily: Noctuoidea
- Family: Erebidae
- Genus: Crypsotidia
- Species: C. bullula

Binomial name
- Crypsotidia bullula Kühne, 2005

Species of moth

Crypsotidia bullula is a moth of the family Erebidae. It is found in Ethiopia and Senegal.
