= Condylorrhiza oculatalis =

Scientific classification
- Kingdom: Animalia
- Phylum: Arthropoda
- Class: Insecta
- Order: Lepidoptera
- Family: Crambidae
- Genus: Condylorrhiza
- Species: C. oculatalis

Binomial name
- Condylorrhiza oculatalis (Möschler, 1890)

Synonyms
- Botys oculatalis Möschler, 1890

Species of moth

Condylorrhiza oculatalis is a moth in the family Crambidae. It was described by Heinrich Benno Möschler in 1890. It can be found in Puerto Rico and Cuba.
