= Crypsotidia postfusca =

Scientific classification
- Kingdom: Animalia
- Phylum: Arthropoda
- Class: Insecta
- Order: Lepidoptera
- Superfamily: Noctuoidea
- Family: Erebidae
- Genus: Crypsotidia
- Species: C. postfusca

Binomial name
- Crypsotidia postfusca Kühne, 2005

Synonyms
- Crypsotidia mesosema ab. postfusca Strand, 1913; Crypsotidia mesostema ab. postfuca Strand, 1928

Species of moth

Crypsotidia postfusca is a moth of the family Erebidae. It is found in Egypt, Ethiopia, Kenya and Tanzania.
