= Maxera marchalii =

Scientific classification
- Kingdom: Animalia
- Phylum: Arthropoda
- Clade: Pancrustacea
- Class: Insecta
- Order: Lepidoptera
- Superfamily: Noctuoidea
- Family: Erebidae
- Genus: Maxera
- Species: M. marchalii

Binomial name
- Maxera marchalii (Boisduval; 1833)

Synonyms
- Ophiusa marshalii Boisduval, 1833; Herminia kerima Felder & Rogenhofer, 1874; Maxera marmorea (Hampson, 1891); Maxera melanocephala (Hampson, 1891); Alamis nigrocollaris Saalmüller, 1891; Renodes pallidula Butler, 1875

Species of moth

Maxera marchalii is a moth of the family Erebidae.

== Distribution ==
It is found in Africa, where it is known from Congo, Comoros, Uganda, Kenya, Tanzania, Zambia, South Africa, Mauritius, Réunion, Madagascar, Seychelles and Yemen.
