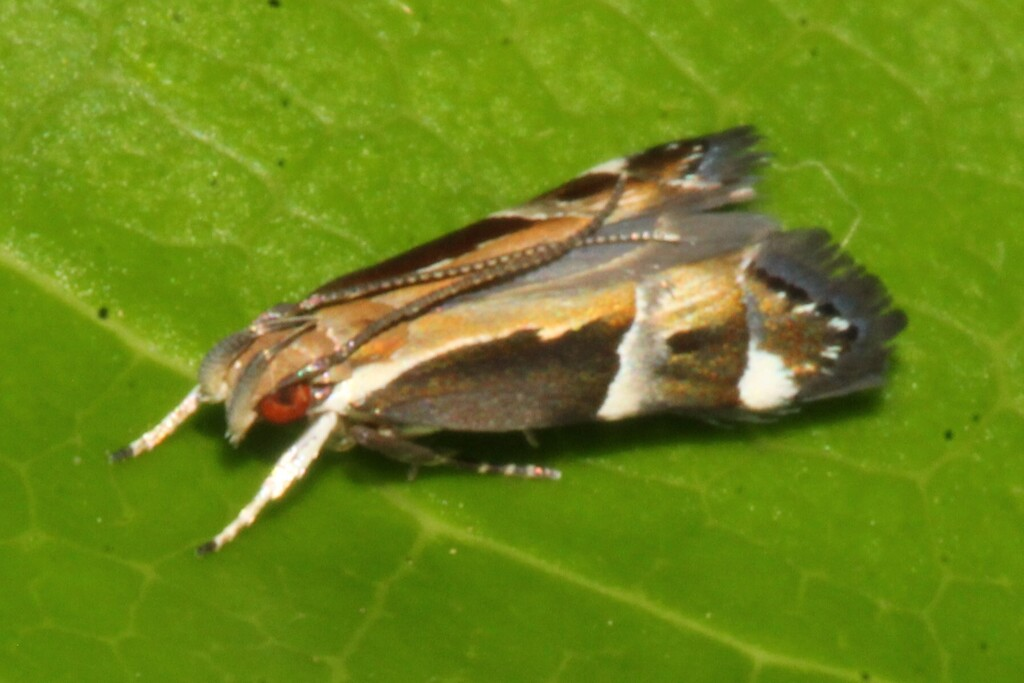

Scientific classification
- Kingdom: Animalia
- Phylum: Arthropoda
- Clade: Pancrustacea
- Class: Insecta
- Order: Lepidoptera
- Family: Gelechiidae
- Genus: Helcystogramma
- Species: H. lamprostoma

Binomial name
- Helcystogramma lamprostoma Zeller, 1847

Synonyms
- Anacampsis scutata Meyrick, 1894; Dichomeris lamprostoma (Zeller, 1847); Gelechia lamprostoma Zeller, 1847; Helcystogramma scutata (Meyrick, 1894)

= Helcystogramma lamprostoma =

Species of moth in Africa

Helcystogramma lamprostoma is a species of moth in the family Gelechiidae.

== Description ==
Helcystogramma lamprostoma was described by Philipp Christoph Zeller in 1847.

== Range ==
Helcystogramma lamprostoma is widely distributed across Africa.

== Ecology ==
Documented host plants of Helcystogramma lamprostoma have been in the families Convolvulaceae, Fabaceae, and Combretaceae.
