= Crypsotidia maculifera =

Scientific classification
- Kingdom: Animalia
- Phylum: Arthropoda
- Class: Insecta
- Order: Lepidoptera
- Superfamily: Noctuoidea
- Family: Erebidae
- Genus: Crypsotidia
- Species: C. maculifera

Binomial name
- Crypsotidia maculifera (Staudinger, 1898)

Synonyms
- Hydrilla maculifera Staudinger, 1898; Crypsotidia conifera Hampson, 1913; Crypsotidia maculata Tams, 1926

Species of moth

Crypsotidia maculifera is a species of moth in the family Erebidae first described by Otto Staudinger in 1898. The species is found in Burkina Faso, Cape Verde, Egypt, Ethiopia, Ghana, Kenya, Malawi, Mauritania, Niger, Nigeria, Senegal, Sudan, Cyprus and Israel.

There is one generation per year depending on the location. Adults are on wing from March to August depending on the location.
