= Crypsotidia mesosema =

Scientific classification
- Kingdom: Animalia
- Phylum: Arthropoda
- Class: Insecta
- Order: Lepidoptera
- Superfamily: Noctuoidea
- Family: Erebidae
- Genus: Crypsotidia
- Species: C. mesosema

Binomial name
- Crypsotidia mesosema Hampson, 1913

Synonyms
- Crypsotidia griseola Rothschild, 1921

Species of moth

Crypsotidia mesosema is a moth of the family Erebidae first described by George Hampson in 1913. It is found in Burkina Faso, Cape Verde, Egypt, Ghana, Kenya, Niger, Nigeria, Senegal and Sudan.

The larvae feed on Acacia albida.
