= Condylorrhiza zyphalis =

Scientific classification
- Kingdom: Animalia
- Phylum: Arthropoda
- Class: Insecta
- Order: Lepidoptera
- Family: Crambidae
- Genus: Condylorrhiza
- Species: C. zyphalis

Binomial name
- Condylorrhiza zyphalis (Viette, 1958)

Synonyms
- Pyrausta zyphalis Viette, 1958

Species of moth

Condylorrhiza zyphalis is a species of moth of the family Crambidae. It is found in Madagascar and La Réunion.

Its wingspan is 28–30 mm, with a length of the forewings of 13.5–14.5 millimetres (0.53–0.57 in).

== Foodplants ==
The larvae feed on the Salicaceae species Homalium paniculatum.
