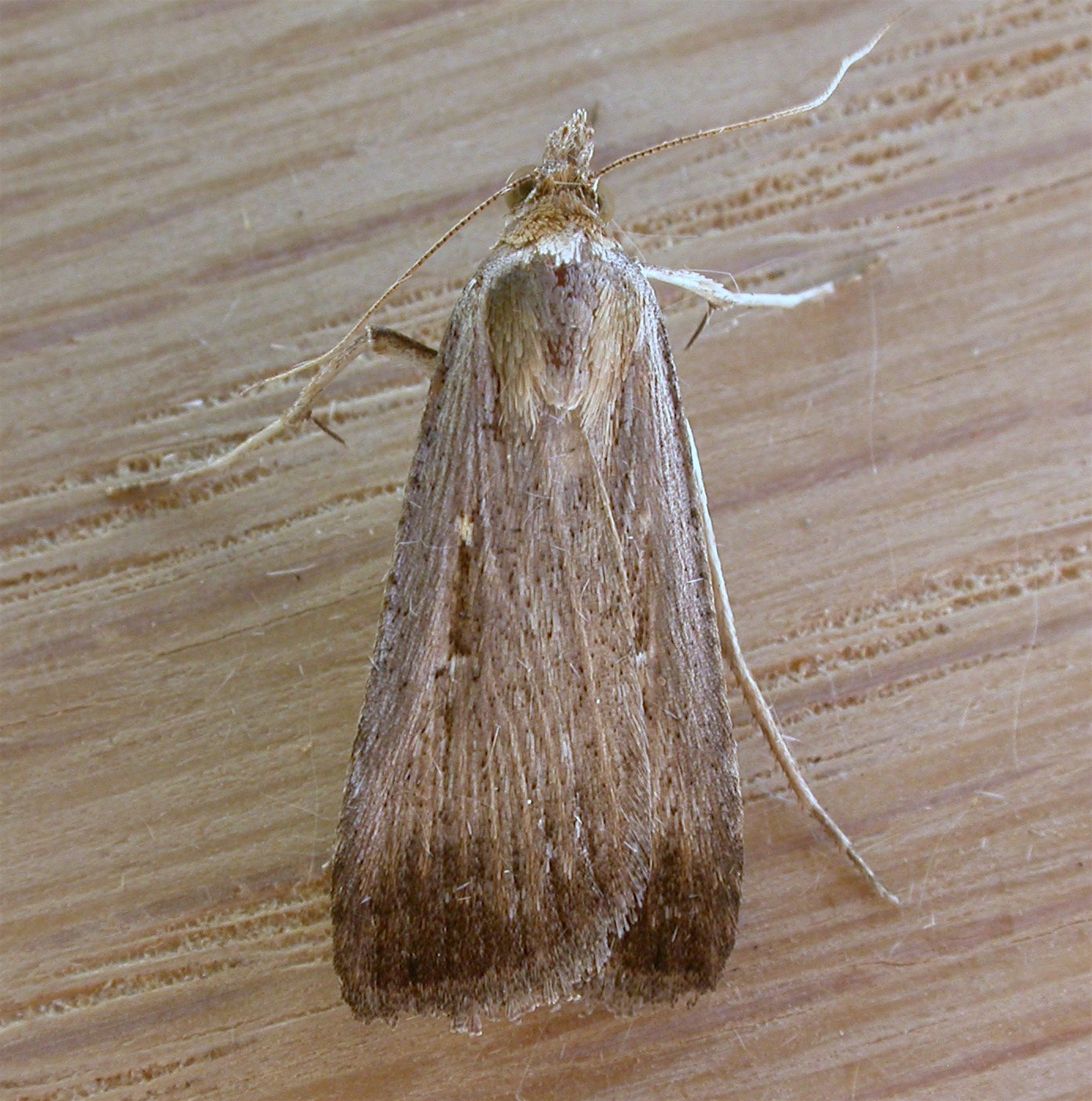

Scientific classification
- Kingdom: Animalia
- Phylum: Arthropoda
- Clade: Pancrustacea
- Class: Insecta
- Order: Lepidoptera
- Superfamily: Noctuoidea
- Family: Erebidae
- Genus: Tathorhynchus; Hampson, 1894
- Species: T. exsiccata

Binomial name
- Tathorhynchus exsiccata (Lederer, 1855)

Synonyms
- Tathorhyncus fallax; Spintherops exsiccata; Scopula vinctalis; Scopula exsiccatus; Platysenta angustiorata; Platysenta exsiccatus; Tathorhyncus greuteri; Tathorhynchus exsiccatus; Tarthorhynchus exsiccata; Lygephila exsiccata

= Tathorhynchus =

Genus and species of moth

Tathorhynchus is a monotypic genus of moth in the family Erebidae erected by George Hampson in 1894. Its only species, Tathorhynchus exsiccata, the Levant blackneck or double-spotted snout, was first described by Julius Lederer in 1855. The nominate form is found on the Canary Islands and in North Africa, tropical Asia and tropical Africa. It has been introduced in Dominica and Argentina. Subspecies Tathorhynchus exsiccata fallax is found in the northern half of Australia, as well as Norfolk Island and New Zealand.

== Taxonomy ==
This species was transferred to Lygephila exsiccata by Goater et al. in 2003, but was returned to Tathorhynchus Hampson by Fibiger and Hacker in 2005.

== Technical description and variation ==
T. exsiccata Led. (= vinctalis Walk.) Forewing whitish, thickly suffused with grey brown, darker towards termen; the orbicular and reniform stigmata marked by pale spots separated by a black dash; another beyond reniform; outer line pale preceded by black marks; a terminal row of black lunules; hindwing greyish white, darker terminally.

The wingspan is about 40 mm.

== Subspecies ==
- Tathorhynchus exsiccata exsiccata
- Tathorhynchus exsiccata fallax

== Biology ==
The larvae of the nominate form feed on Indigofera tinctoria, Medicago sativa and Spartium junceum. The larvae of Tathorhynchus exsiccata fallax probably feed on Medicago sativa.
