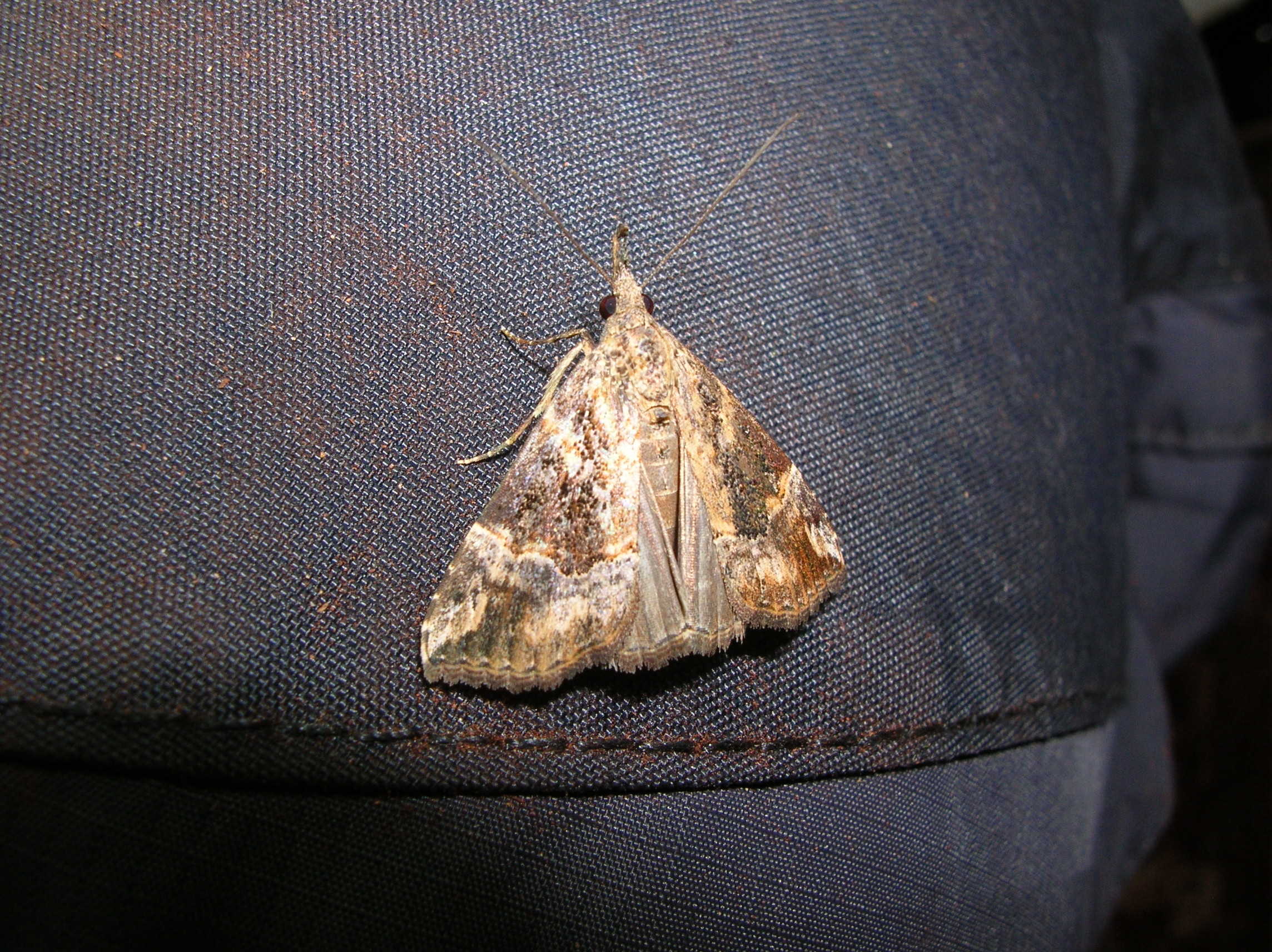

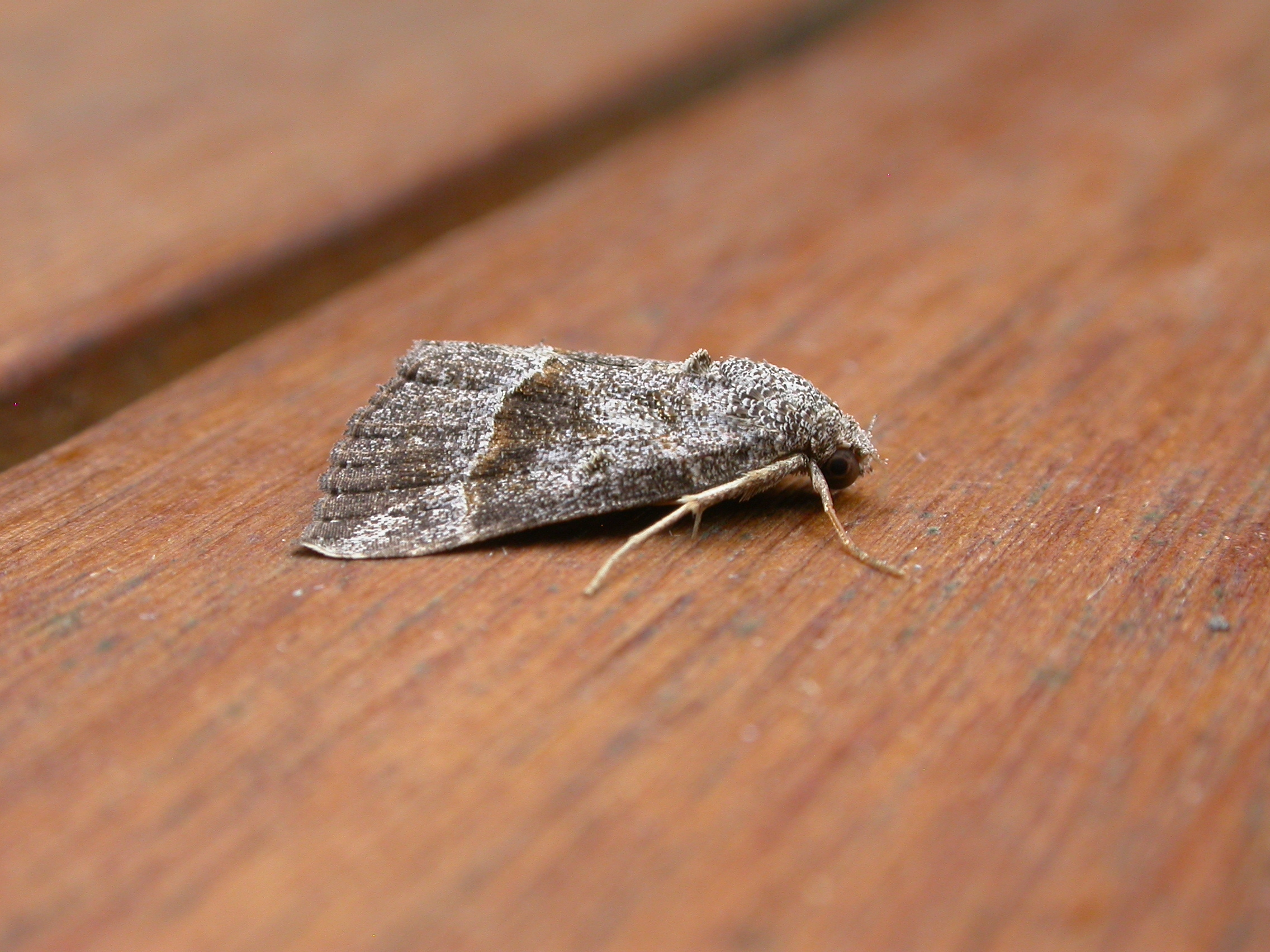

Scientific classification
- Kingdom: Animalia
- Phylum: Arthropoda
- Class: Insecta
- Order: Lepidoptera
- Superfamily: Noctuoidea
- Family: Erebidae
- Genus: Hypena
- Species: H. laceratalis

Binomial name
- Hypena laceratalis Walker, 1859

Synonyms
- Hypena comptalis Moore, 1885; Hypena acrocompsa Turner, 1932

= Hypena laceratalis =

Species of moth

Hypena laceratalis, the lantana defoliator, is a moth of the family Erebidae. It was first described by Francis Walker in 1859. It is native to Africa (where it is known from Kenya, Socotra, Madagascar, Mascarenes) to Yemen, India and Myanmar but was deliberately introduced to Australia (where it now known from northern Queensland to Kempsey in New South Wales) via Hawaii in 1965 to control the weed Lantana camara.

The larvae feed on Lantana camara.

Development from egg to adult takes about 28 days. Adults live for about two weeks.

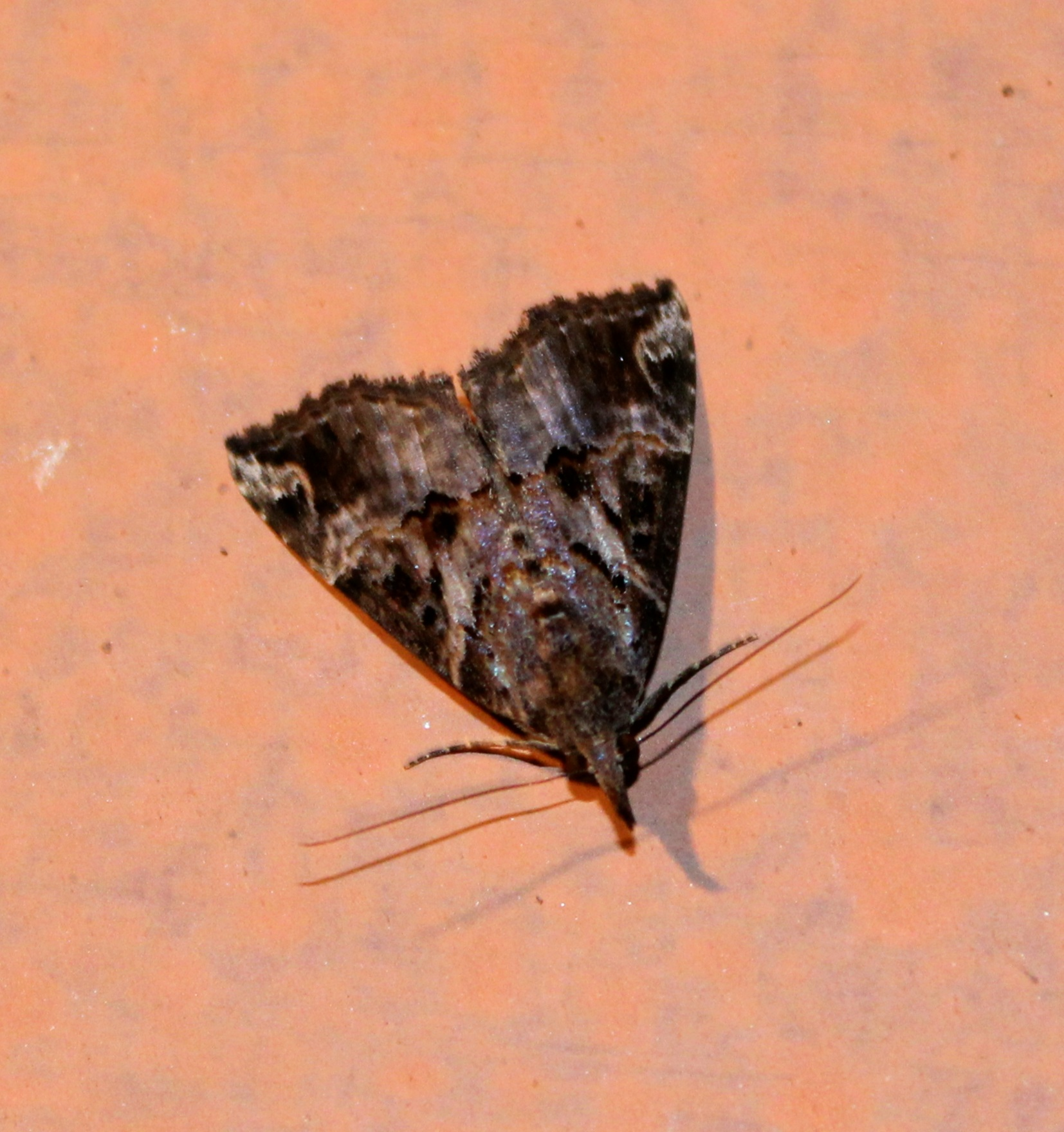
from Sri Lanka
