= Eudonia fogoalis =

Scientific classification
- Kingdom: Animalia
- Phylum: Arthropoda
- Class: Insecta
- Order: Lepidoptera
- Family: Crambidae
- Genus: Eudonia
- Species: E. fogoalis

Binomial name
- Eudonia fogoalis Derra, 2008

Species of moth

Eudonia fogoalis is a moth in the family Crambidae. It was described by Georg Derra in 2008. It is found on the island of Fogo, Cape Verde.
