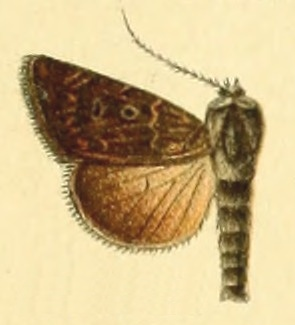

Scientific classification
- Domain: Eukaryota
- Kingdom: Animalia
- Phylum: Arthropoda
- Class: Insecta
- Order: Lepidoptera
- Superfamily: Noctuoidea
- Family: Noctuidae
- Genus: Euxoa
- Species: E. canariensis

Binomial name
- Euxoa canariensis (Rebel, 1902)

Synonyms
- Agrotis canariensis Rebel, 1902

= Euxoa canariensis =

Species of moth

Euxoa canariensis is a moth of the family Noctuidae. It is found from the Canary Islands throughout the arid and semi-arid areas of North Africa to Arabia, Israel, Jordan, Iran and Afghanistan.

Adults are on wing in March to May. There is one generation per year.

== Subspecies ==
- Euxoa canariensis canariensis
- Euxoa canariensis mauretanica (North Africa)
- Euxoa canariensis diamondi (Israel, United Arab Emirates)
