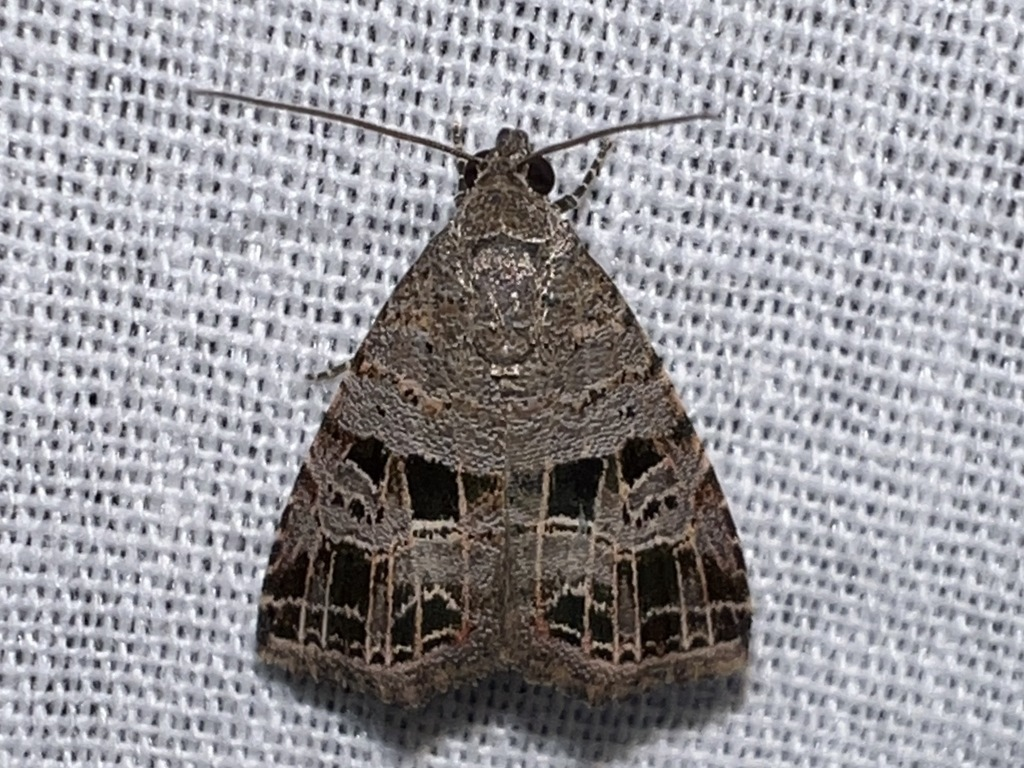

Scientific classification
- Kingdom: Animalia
- Phylum: Arthropoda
- Class: Insecta
- Order: Lepidoptera
- Superfamily: Noctuoidea
- Family: Noctuidae
- Genus: Ozarba
- Species: O. rubrivena

Binomial name
- Ozarba rubrivena Hampson, 1910

= Ozarba rubrivena =

Species of moth

Ozarba rubrivena is a species of moth in the family Noctuidae.

== Description ==
Described by George Hampson in 1910.

== Range ==
Present in the Afrotropical region.
