= Zizyphia =

Scientific classification
- Kingdom: Animalia
- Phylum: Arthropoda
- Clade: Pancrustacea
- Class: Insecta
- Order: Lepidoptera
- Family: Depressariidae
- Genus: Zizyphia; Chrétien, 1908

Genus of moths

Zizyphia is a moth genus of the superfamily Gelechioidea. It is mostly placed in the family Gelechiidae, but may belong in the Oecophoridae.

Resembling Orophia in some aspects, it would warrant inclusion in the tribe Orophinii. These are today usually placed in subfamily Oecophorinae, but often used to be assigned to the Depressariinae.

== Species ==
- Zizyphia cleodorella Chrétien, 1908
- Zizyphia zizyphella Amsel, 1935
