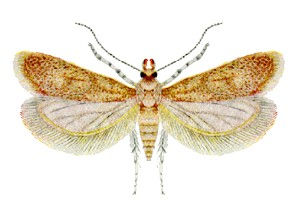

Scientific classification
- Kingdom: Animalia
- Phylum: Arthropoda
- Class: Insecta
- Order: Lepidoptera
- Family: Gelechiidae
- Genus: Scrobipalpa
- Species: S. aptatella

Binomial name
- Scrobipalpa aptatella (Walker, 1864)

Synonyms
- Gelechia aptatella Walker, 1864; Gelechia heliopa Lower, 1900

= Scrobipalpa aptatella =

Species of moth

Scrobipalpa aptatella (tobacco stem borer) is a moth of the family Gelechiidae. It is found in China (Xinjiang), Australia (where it has been recorded from Western Australia, the Northern Territory, Queensland, New South Wales, Victoria, Tasmania and South Australia), New Zealand, Samoa, India, Indonesia (Sumatra), Malaysia, Myanmar, Sri Lanka, Palestine and in Africa, where it has been recorded from the Democratic Republic of Congo, Kenya, Malawi, Namibia, South Africa, Tanzania and Zimbabwe.

The wingspan is 8–11 mm (0.31–0.43 in). The forewings are ochreous, slightly fuscous-tinged, with darker irregular spots throughout, obscure and sometimes hardly traceable, not forming definite markings. The hindwings are light fuscous.

The larvae feed on Nicotiana tabacum, Nicotiana rustica, Datura species, Solanum dubium, Solanum melongena and Solanum tuberosum. They bore the stem of their host plant.
