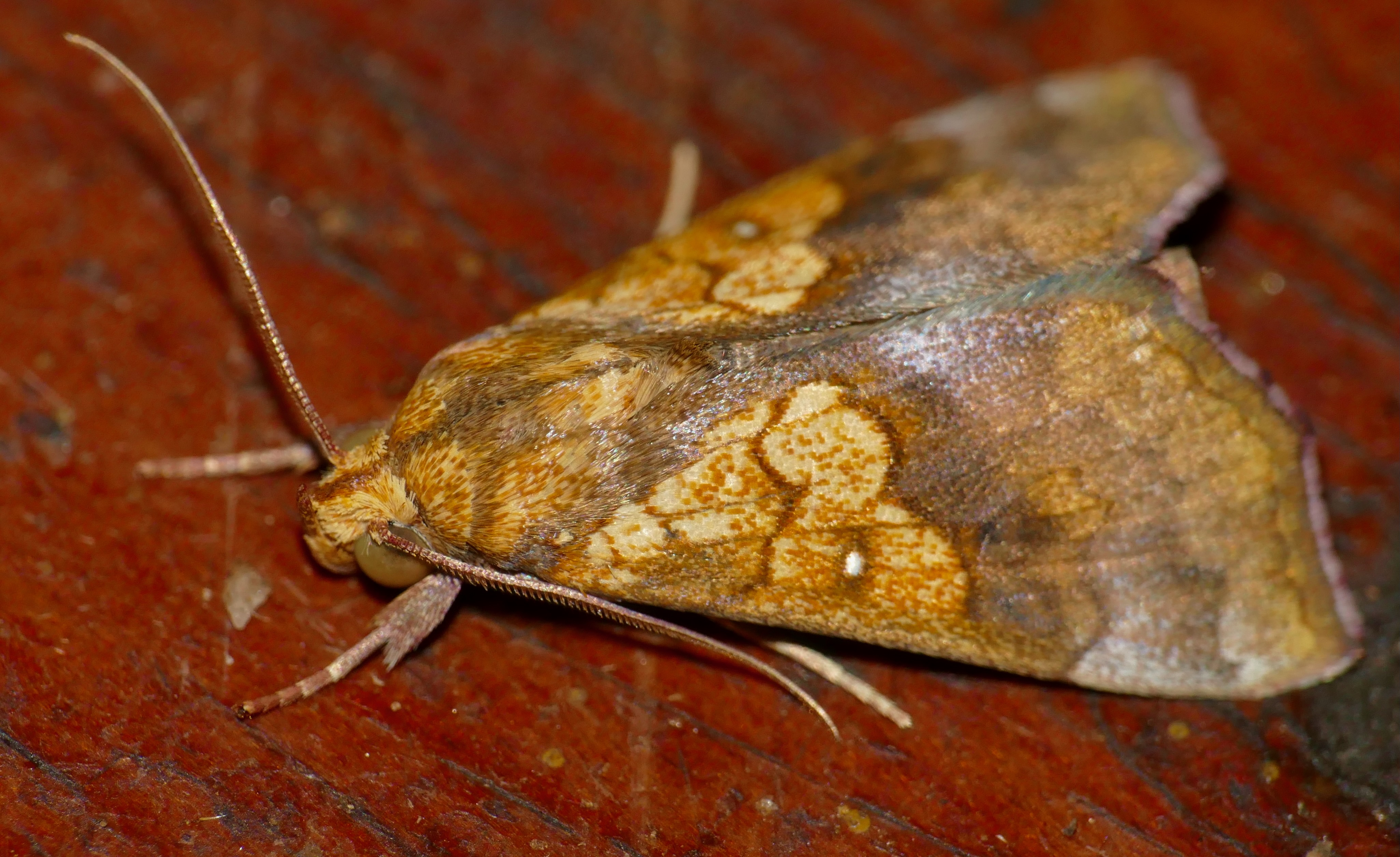

Scientific classification
- Kingdom: Animalia
- Phylum: Arthropoda
- Class: Insecta
- Order: Lepidoptera
- Superfamily: Noctuoidea
- Family: Erebidae
- Genus: Anomis
- Species: A. auragoides

Binomial name
- Anomis auragoides (Guenée, 1852)

Synonyms
- Cosmophila auragoides Guenée, 1852

= Anomis auragoides =

Species of moth

Anomis auragoides is a moth of the family Noctuidae first described by Achille Guenée in 1852. It is found in central and southern Africa, and is known from Cape Verde, Uganda, the Democratic Republic of the Congo, South Africa, Madagascar, the Comoros and Réunion.

The wingspan is about 28–30 mm.
