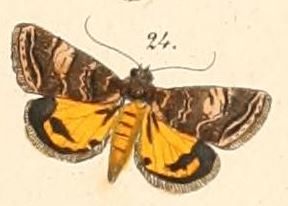

Scientific classification
- Kingdom: Animalia
- Phylum: Arthropoda
- Class: Insecta
- Order: Lepidoptera
- Superfamily: Noctuoidea
- Family: Noctuidae
- Genus: Ozarba
- Species: O. acclivis

Binomial name
- Ozarba acclivis (R. Felder & Rogenhofer, 1874)

Synonyms
- Acontia acclivis Felder & Rogenhofer, 1874; Microphysa perssoni Wallengren, 1875; Acontiola acclivis (R. Felder & Rogenhofer, 1875)

= Ozarba acclivis =

Species of moth

Ozarba acclivis is a moth of the family Noctuidae first described by Rudolf Felder and Alois Friedrich Rogenhofer in 1874. It is found Namibia and South Africa.
