= Scopula retracta =

Scientific classification
- Domain: Eukaryota
- Kingdom: Animalia
- Phylum: Arthropoda
- Class: Insecta
- Order: Lepidoptera
- Family: Geometridae
- Genus: Scopula
- Species: S. retracta

Binomial name
- Scopula retracta (Hausmann, 2006)

Synonyms
- Zygophyxia retracta Hausmann, 2006

Species of geometer moth in subfamily Sterrhinae

Scopula retracta is a moth of the family Geometridae that is endemic to Yemen.
