= Zizyphia cleodorella =

Scientific classification
- Kingdom: Animalia
- Phylum: Arthropoda
- Clade: Pancrustacea
- Class: Insecta
- Order: Lepidoptera
- Family: Depressariidae
- Genus: Zizyphia
- Species: Z. cleodorella

Binomial name
- Zizyphia cleodorella Chrétien, 1908

Species of moth

Zizyphia cleodorella is a moth in the family Depressariidae and the type species of its genus. It was described by Pierre Chrétien in 1908. It is found in Algeria, Spain, and on the Cape Verde islands. Larvae feed on Ziziphus species. Adults are attracted to light.

== Taxonomy and systematics ==
Genus Zizyphia has previously been placed in Gelechiidae, but was transferred to the Depressariidae in 2009 by A.L. Lvovsky. Lauri Kaila, Ole Karsholt and Txema Revilla in their 2024 paper on Zizyphia cleodorella also place it within the Depressariidae.
