= Zelosyne =

Scientific classification
- Domain: Eukaryota
- Kingdom: Animalia
- Phylum: Arthropoda
- Class: Insecta
- Order: Lepidoptera
- Family: Gelechiidae
- Subfamily: Gelechiinae
- Genus: Zelosyne; Walsingham, 1911

Genus of moths

Zelosyne is a genus of moths in the family Gelechiidae.

== Species ==
- Zelosyne olga Meyrick, 1915
- Zelosyne poecilosoma Walsingham, 1911
