= Crypsotidia remanei =

Scientific classification
- Kingdom: Animalia
- Phylum: Arthropoda
- Class: Insecta
- Order: Lepidoptera
- Superfamily: Noctuoidea
- Family: Erebidae
- Genus: Crypsotidia
- Species: C. remanei

Binomial name
- Crypsotidia remanei Wiltshire, 1977

Species of moth

Crypsotidia remanei is a moth of the family Erebidae first described by Wiltshire in 1977. It is found in Cape Verde, Ghana, Mauritania, Niger, Nigeria, Senegal and Sudan.

The larvae feed on Acacia albida.
