= Cataonia mauritanica =

Scientific classification
- Domain: Eukaryota
- Kingdom: Animalia
- Phylum: Arthropoda
- Class: Insecta
- Order: Lepidoptera
- Family: Crambidae
- Subfamily: Odontiinae
- Tribe: Odontiini
- Genus: Cataonia
- Species: C. mauritanica

Binomial name
- Cataonia mauritanica Amsel, 1953

Species of moth

Cataonia mauritanica is a moth in the family Crambidae. It was described by Hans Georg Amsel in 1953. It is found in Mauritania.
