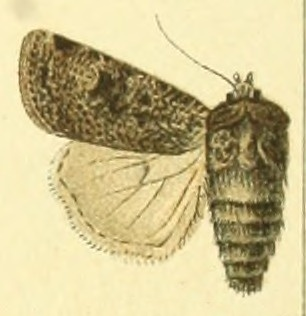
- Female
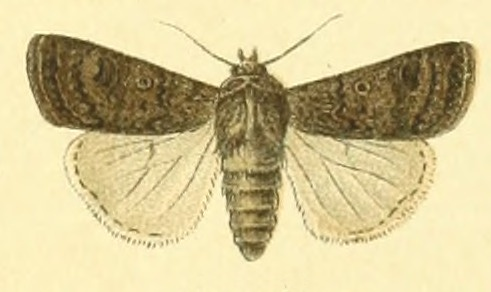
- Male

Scientific classification
- Kingdom: Animalia
- Phylum: Arthropoda
- Clade: Pancrustacea
- Class: Insecta
- Order: Lepidoptera
- Superfamily: Noctuoidea
- Family: Noctuidae
- Genus: Agrotis
- Species: A. trux

Binomial name
- Agrotis trux (Hübner, [1824])

Synonyms
- Noctua trux Hübner, [1824]; Agrotis lenticulosa Duponchel, 1826; Agrotis lunigera Stephens, 1829; Agrotis terranea Freyer, 1831; Agrotis amasina Staudinger, 1901; Agrotis subalba Corti & Draudt, 1933 (preocc.); Agrotis adolfi Corti & Draudt,1933

= Agrotis trux =

Crescent dart

Species of moth

Agrotis trux, the crescent dart, is a moth of the family Noctuidae. The species was first described by Jacob Hübner in 1824. It has a circum-Mediterranean distribution and is found along the coasts of France, Ireland, England, southern Europe, Algeria, Syria, Iraq, Iran, southern Russia and the Arabian Peninsula. In Africa, it is found as far south as South Africa.

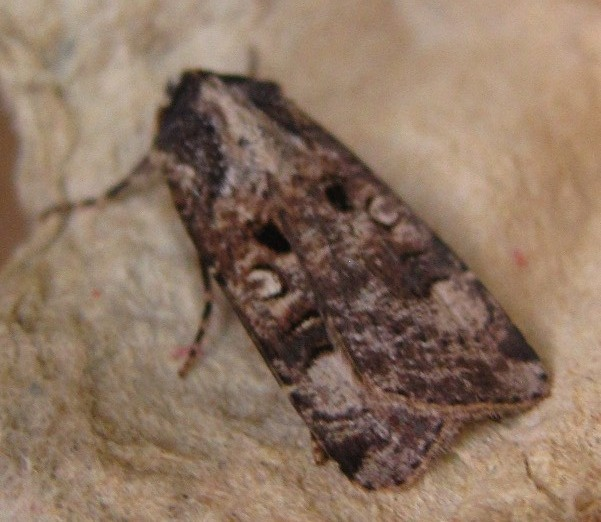

== Description ==
The wingspan is 35–42 mm. Forewing ochreous grey, dappled and striated, and often, especially in the females, suffused with dark fuscous; claviform stigma black-edged; reniform large, filled in with black; orbicular small, round, with a pale ring; fringe rufous; hindwing dull whitish, with fuscous terminal suffusion, broader in female; or with a curved row of dark dashes on veins and no suffusion; a variable species, occurring throughout southern Europe, in Algeria, the Canaries, southern Russia and Asia Minor; — in ab. olivina Stgr. the forewing is smooth olive grey, with no or little irroration (sprinkling), the markings concisely red brown: - ab. terranea Frr. has the suffusion and markings rufous; — ab. amasina Stgr. is fuscous grey, with blackish median shade, the ground colour darker in the female; — subsp. lunigera Stph. Forewing fuscous or pale grey, varied with yellowish; the lines distinct; orbicular stigma small; reniform large, and blackish; claviform black; occurs on the south coast of England and Ireland; — ab. pallida Tutt is whitish grey with a slaty tinge, not irrorated with yellow; — ab. virgata Tutt with a dark shade before reniform stigma and the outer third of wing dark; — ab. suffusa Tutt has the whole wing suffused with, blackish grey, except the pale orbicular and a small patch between reniform and outer line; — ab. nigra Tutt has the forewing unicolorous blackish, the lines and stigmata more intense, the orbicular sometimes visible; — and ab. rufescens Tutt like the type but tinged throughout with reddish.

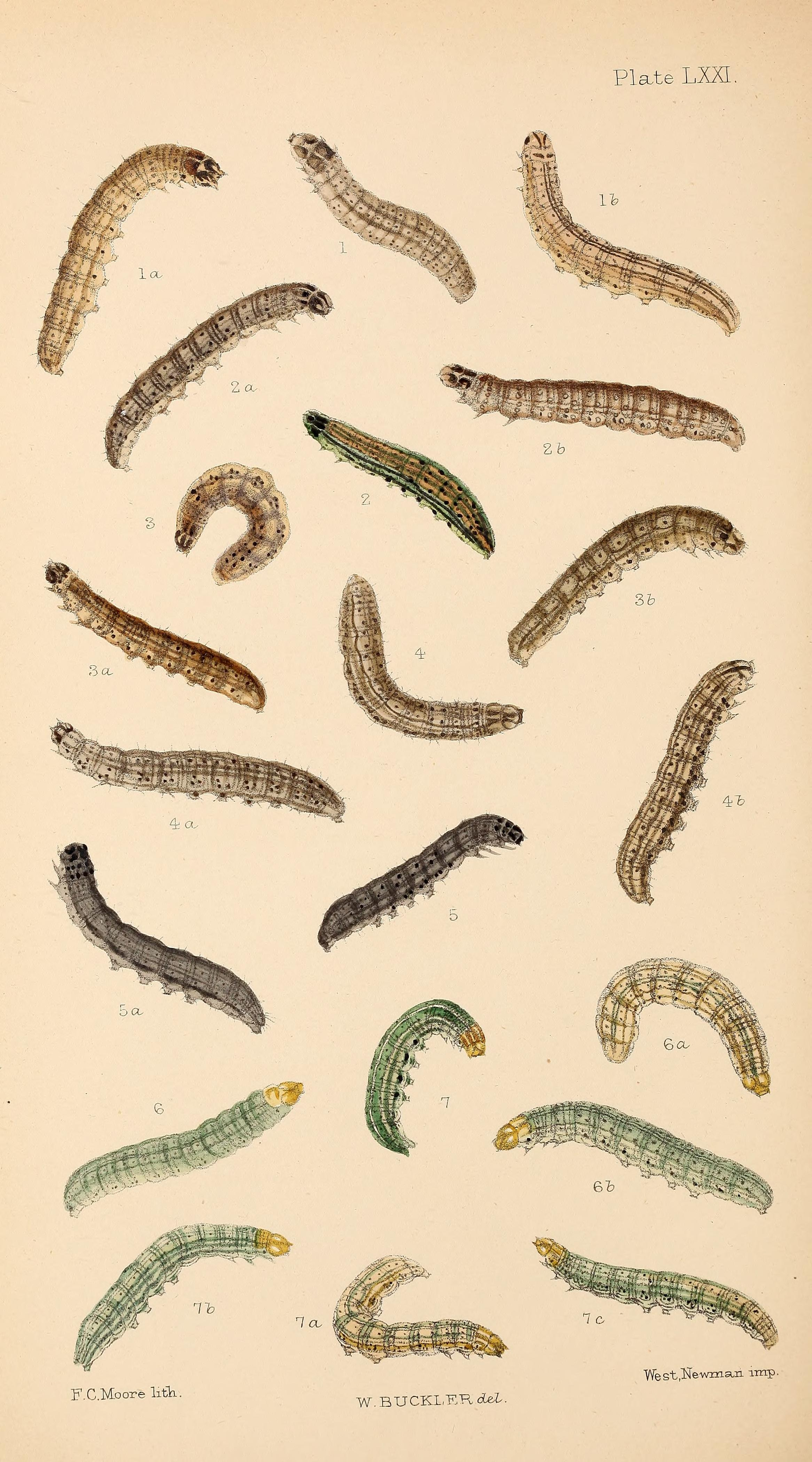
Figs 2,2a, 2b larva after last moult

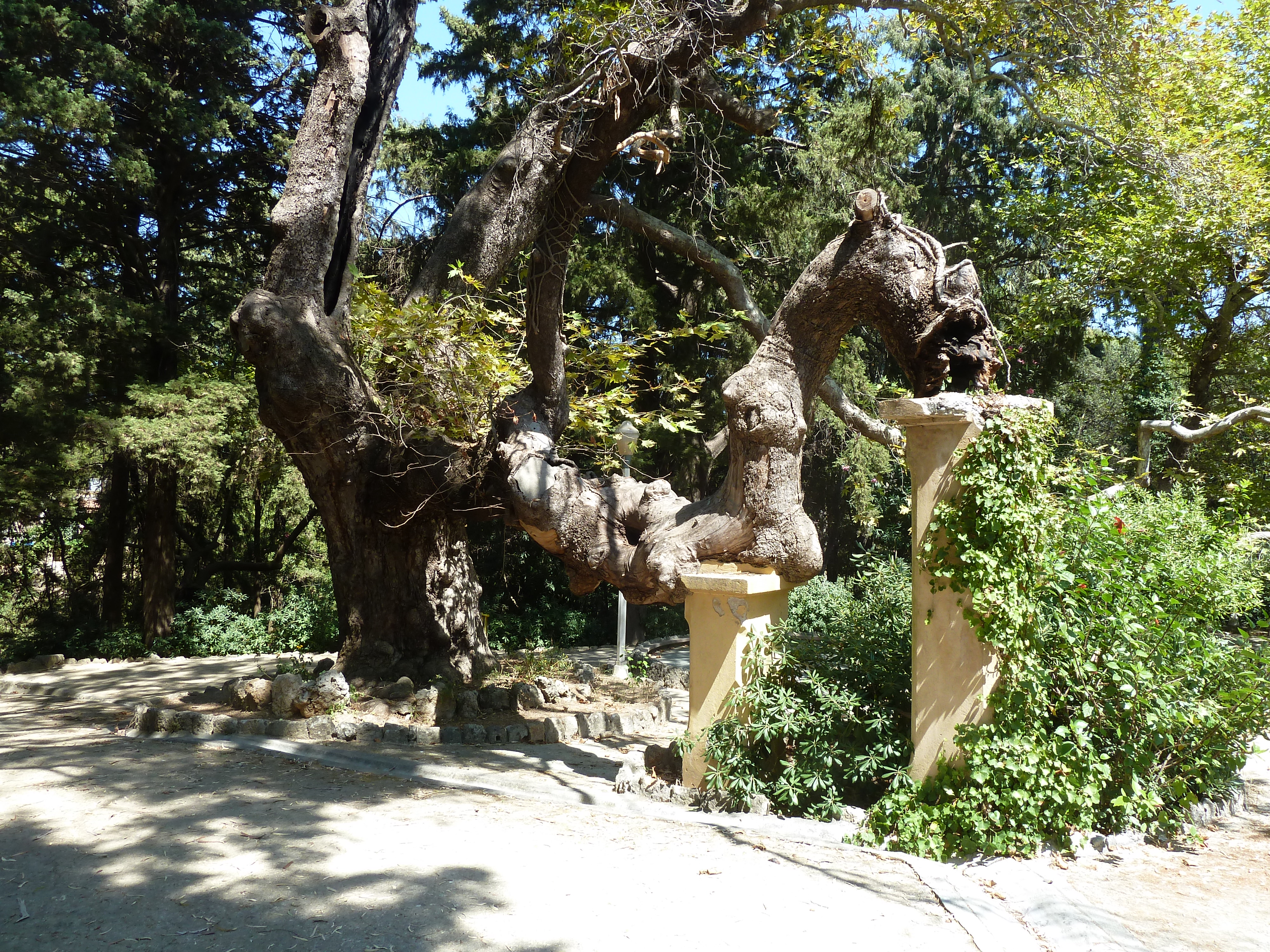
Habita at Rodini Park in Rhodes, Greece

== Biology ==
Adults are on wing in September to April. There is one generation per year. The larva is greyish or greenish grey, inclining to brownish above, and with darker brown marks on the back. The lines are paler, edged sometimes with darker grey. Raised spots are blackish, rather glossy. The head is brownish, marked with black, and the plate on first ring is black with a central yellow line. The larvae feed on the roots of various herbaceous plants, including Taraxacum and Polygonum.

== Subspecies ==
- Agrotis trux trux
- Agrotis trux lunigera (Great Britain)
