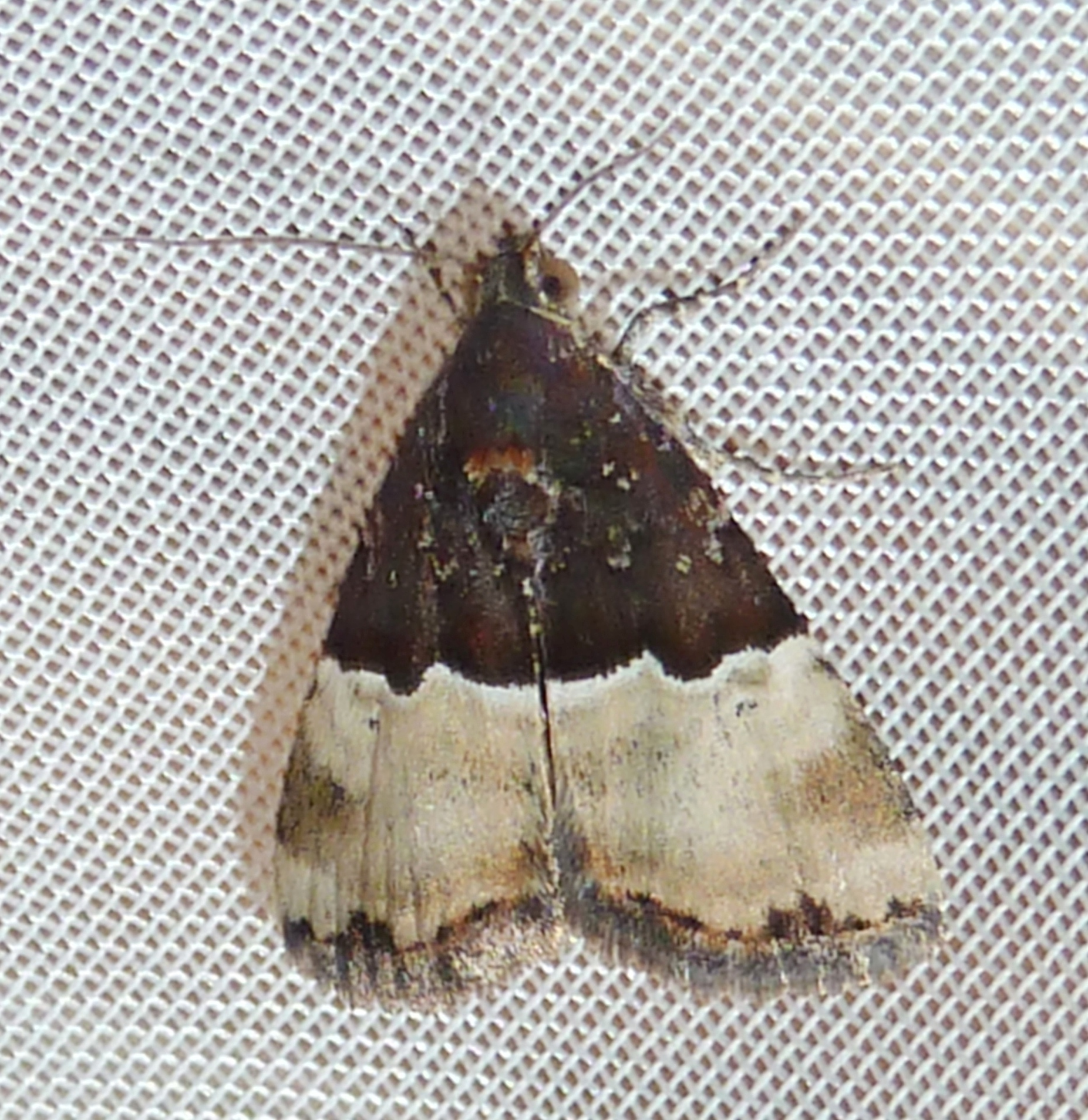
- Ozarba hemiochra

Scientific classification
- Kingdom: Animalia
- Phylum: Arthropoda
- Class: Insecta
- Order: Lepidoptera
- Superfamily: Noctuoidea
- Family: Noctuidae
- Subfamily: Eustrotiinae
- Genus: Ozarba; Walker, 1865

Synonyms
- Oedicodia Hampson, 1910

= Ozarba =

Genus of moths

Ozarba is a genus of moths of the family Noctuidae. The genus was erected by Francis Walker in 1865.

== Species ==
- Ozarba abscissa (Walker, 1858) Kenya, Uganda, Malawi, Tanzania, Mozambique, Madagascar, Zambia, Zimbabwe, South Africa, Namibia, Gambia
- Ozarba abscondita Hampson, 1918 Peru
- Ozarba acantholipina Draudt, 1950 Yunnan
- Ozarba accincta (Distant, 1898) Kenya, Tanzania, South Africa
- Ozarba acclivis Felder & Rogenhofer, 1874
- Ozarba adaptata Hacker, 2016 Yemen
- Ozarba adducta Berio, 1940 Oman, Sudan, Ethiopia, Eritrea
- Ozarba aeria (Grote, 1881) Wisconsin, Mexico
- Ozarba africana Berio, 1940 Nigeria, Zaire, Rwanda, Tanzania, Zimbabwe
- Ozarba agraria Schaus, 1911 Costa Rica
- Ozarba alberti Wiltshire, 1994 Arabia, Ethiopia, Kenya
- Ozarba albifascia (Walker, 1865) South Africa
- Ozarba albimarginata (Hampson, 1895) India (Gujarat), Ethiopia, Somalia, South Africa
- Ozarba albomediovittata Berio, 1937 Ethiopia, Somalia, Kenya, Tanzania, South Africa
- Ozarba aldabrae Berio, 1959 Seychelles
- Ozarba algaini Wiltshire, 1983
- Ozarba aloisiisabaudiae Berio, 1937 Somalia, Kenya, Tanzania
- Ozarba amazonia (Warren, 1889) Brazil (Amazonas, São Paulo)
- Ozarba angola Hacker, 2016 Angola
- Ozarba angulilinea Schaus, 1914 French Guiana
- Ozarba apicalis Hampson, 1910 Arabia, Ethiopia, Kenya, Tanzania, Zambia, South Africa
- Ozarba argentofusca Hacker, 2016 Yemen, Ethiopia, Kenya, Namibia
- Ozarba argyrogramma (Hampson, 1914) Burkina Faso, Guinea, Senegal, Gambia, Ghana, Nigeria, Congo, Zaire, Angola, Sudan, Ethiopia, Kenya, Malawi, Tanzania, South Africa, Namibia
- Ozarba atribasalis (Hampson, 1896) Oman, Yemen
- Ozarba atrifera Hampson, 1910
- Ozarba atrisigna (Hampson, 1910) Ethiopia, Kenya, Tanzania, Namibia
- Ozarba badia (Swinhoe, 1886) India (Madhya Pradesh)
- Ozarba bascura Dyar, 1914 Brazil (São Paulo)
- Ozarba berioi Hacker, 2016 Yemen, Ethiopia, Kenya, Tanzania
- Ozarba besidia (H. Druce, 1898) Mexico
- Ozarba bettina (H. Druce, 1898) Mexico
- Ozarba bicolora (Bethune-Baker, 1911) Ethiopia, Kenya, Uganda, Tanzania
- Ozarba bicoloria Gaede, 1915 Namibia, South Africa
- Ozarba bicornis Hampson, 1910 Paraguay
- Ozarba binorbis Hampson, 1910
- Ozarba bipars Hampson, 1891 India (Tamil Nadu)
- Ozarba bipartita (Hampson, 1902) Angola, South Africa, Zimbabwe, Arabia, Ethiopia, Tanzania
- Ozarba bisexualis Hampson, 1910
- Ozarba boursini Berio, 1940
- Ozarba brachycampta Hacker, 2016 Ethiopia, Tanzania
- Ozarba brunnea (Leech, 1900) China
- Ozarba capreolana Rebel, 1947 Egypt
- Ozarba captata Berio, 1940 Eritrea
- Ozarba catilina (H. Druce, 1889) Mexico
- Ozarba catoxantha (Hampson, 1910) Botswana, South Africa, Namibia
- Ozarba chionoperas Hampson, 1918
- Ozarba choruba Dyar, 1914 Mexico
- Ozarba chromatographa Hacker, 2016 Tanzania
- Ozarba chrysaspis (Meyrick, 1891) Australia (Queensland)
- Ozarba chryseiplaga Hampson, 1910
- Ozarba cinda Schaus, 1940 Puerto Rico
- Ozarba cinerea (Aurivillius, 1879) Namibia
- Ozarba concolor Hampson, 1918 Peru
- Ozarba consanguis (Hampson, 1902) Somalia, Ethiopia, Kenya, Tanzania, Botswana, Zambia, Zimbabwe, South Africa, Angola, Zaire
- Ozarba consternans Hayes, 1975 Galápagos Islands
- Ozarba contempta (Walker, 1858) South Africa
- Ozarba corniculans (Wallengren, 1860) Ethiopia, Kenya, Rwanda, Tanzania, Botswana, Madagascar, Zambia, Zimbabwe, South Africa, Namibia
- Ozarba corniculantis Berio, 1947 South Africa, Senegal
- Ozarba costata Hampson, 1910 Argentina
- Ozarba cryptica Berio, 1940 Eritrea, Ethiopia, Kenya, Tanzania, South Africa, Senegal, Ghana
- Ozarba cryptochrysea Hampson, 1902
- Ozarba cupreofascia Le Cerf, 1922
- Ozarba cyanopasta Hampson, 1910
- Ozarba damagarima Rothschild, 1921 Niger
- Ozarba damarensis Berio, 1940 Namibia
- Ozarba debrosi Wiltshire, 1983
- Ozarba deficiens Berio, 1935 Somalia, Kenya
- Ozarba delogramma Warren, 1913 Khasia Hills
- Ozarba densa Walker, 1865
- Ozarba devylderi Berio, 1940 Namibia
- Ozarba diaphora Berio, 1937 Uganda, Ethiopia
- Ozarba didymochra Hacker, 2016 Ethiopia
- Ozarba dignata (Möschler, 1884) South Africa
- Ozarba diplogramma Hacker, 2016 Nigeria, Zaire
- Ozarba diplopodia Hacker, 2016 South Africa
- Ozarba dissymetrica Hacker, 2016 Ethiopia, Tanzania
- Ozarba divisa Gaede, 1916
- Ozarba domina (Holland, 1894) Ivory Coast, Togo, Gabon, Nigeria, Cameroon, Congo, Zaire, Eritrea, Ethiopia, Kenya, Uganda, Malawi, Tanzania, Mozambique
- Ozarba duosigna Hacker, 2016 Somalia
- Ozarba duplovittata Hacker, 2016 Madagascar
- Ozarba endoplaga Hampson, 1916 Somalia
- Ozarba endoscota Hampson, 1916 Oman, Yemen, Ethiopia, Somalia, Kenya, Tanzania
- Ozarba epimochla Bethune-Baker, 1911
- Ozarba euthygramma Hacker, 2016 Burkina Faso, Ivory Coast
- Ozarba euthygrapha (Hacker, 2016) Tanzania
- Ozarba excisa Hampson, 1891 India (Tamil Nadu)
- Ozarba excurvata Hampson, 1910 Argentina
- Ozarba exolivacea Hampson, 1916
- Ozarba exoplaga Berio, 1940 Cape Verde, Cameroon, Arabia, Sudan, Eritrea, Ethiopia, Kenya, Tanzania, Madagascar
- Ozarba fasciata (Wallengren, 1860) South Africa
- Ozarba felicia Le Cerf, 1922 Kenya
- Ozarba ferruginata Hacker, 2016 Tanzania, Kenya, South Africa
- Ozarba festiva Berio, 1950
- Ozarba flavescens Hampson, 1910 Ethiopia, Kenya, Tanzania, Uganda, eastern Zaire
- Ozarba flavicilia Hampson, 1914 Uganda
- Ozarba flavidiscata Hampson, 1910 Madagascar
- Ozarba flavipennis Hampson, 1910
- Ozarba fuscescens Rebel, 1947 Egypt
- Ozarba fuscogrisea Hacker, 2016 Namibia
- Ozarba fuscopallida Hacker, 2016 Namibia
- Ozarba fuscundosa Hacker, 2016 Ethiopia, Kenya, Zaire
- Ozarba gaedei Berio, 1940 Namibia
- Ozarba genuflexa (Hampson, 1902) South Africa, Namibia, Angola
- Ozarba geta (H. Druce, 1889) Mexico
- Ozarba glaucescens Hampson, 1910 India (Andhra Pradesh)
- Ozarba gonatia Hacker, 2016 Namibia, South Africa
- Ozarba grisescens (Berio, 1947) Ethiopia, Kenya
- Ozarba griveaudae Viette, 1985 Madagascar
- Ozarba heliastis Hampson, 1902
- Ozarba hemichrysea Hampson, 1910
- Ozarba hemileuca Wiltshire, 1982 Arabia, Ethiopia, Somalia, Kenya, Tanzania
- Ozarba hemimelaena Hampson, 1910
- Ozarba hemiochra Hampson, 1910 Oman, Zambia, South Africa, Namibia
- Ozarba hemiphaea (Hampson, 1907) India (Andhra Pradesh), Sri Lanka
- Ozarba hemipolia Hampson, 1910 Yemen, Ethiopia, Tanzania, South Africa, Namibia
- Ozarba hemipyra Hampson, 1916
- Ozarba hemisarca Hampson, 1916 Somalia, Namibia
- Ozarba hemitecta Dyar, 1914 Venezuela
- Ozarba heringi Berio, 1940
- Ozarba hermanstaudei Hacker, 2016 South Africa
- Ozarba hoffmanni Berio, 1940 Brazil (Santa Catarina)
- Ozarba holophaea Hampson, 1910 Argentina
- Ozarba honesta (Walker, 1865) southern India
- Ozarba hypenoides (Butler, 1889) India (Himachal Pradesh, Sikkim)
- Ozarba hypotaenia (Wallengren, 1860) Kenya, Tanzania, Eswatini, South Africa
- Ozarba hypoxantha Wallengren, 1860
- Ozarba illimitata Warren, 1914
- Ozarba illosis (Hampson, 1907) Sri Lanka
- Ozarba imperspicua Hacker & Saldaitis, 2016 Yemen, Oman
- Ozarba implicata Berio, 1940
- Ozarba implora Dyar, 1918 Mexico
- Ozarba incondita Butler, 1889 Nepal, India (Himachal Pradesh)
- Ozarba inobtrusa (Hampson, 1902) Ethiopia, South Africa
- Ozarba inopinata Berio, 1940 Namibia
- Ozarba insignis (Butler, 1884) Arabia, Ethiopia
- Ozarba irrationalis Hacker, 2016 Namibia, Zimbabwe, Botswawa
- Ozarba isocampta Hampson, 1910 Ethiopia, Kenya, Zimbabwe, Botswana, South Africa, Namibia
- Ozarba itwarra Swinhoe, 1885 India (Maharashtra)
- Ozarba jansei Berio, 1940 Ethiopia, Tanzania, Zimbabwe, South Africa, Namibia
- Ozarba joergmuelleris Hacker, 2016 Angola
- Ozarba kalaharis Hacker, 2016 South Africa, Namibia
- Ozarba lamina (Swinhoe, 1901) Myanmar
- Ozarba lascivalis Lederer, 1855
- Ozarba lata Berio, 1977
- Ozarba latizonata Hacker, 2016 Ethiopia, Kenya, Tanzania
- Ozarba legrandi Berio, 1959 Kenya
- Ozarba lepida Saalmüller, 1891 Eritrea, Ethiopia, Kenya, Malawi, Madagascar
- Ozarba leptocyma Hampson, 1914 Senegal, Ghana, Nigeria, Sudan
- Ozarba limbata (Butler, 1898) Oman, Yemen, Eritrea, Ethiopia, Somalia, Kenya, Tanzania
- Ozarba limitata Berio, 1940 Sikkim
- Ozarba madagascana Hacker, 2016 Madagascar
- Ozarba madanda (Felder & Rogenhofer, 1874) South Africa
- Ozarba magnofusca Hacker, 2016 Tanzania
- Ozarba malaisei Berio, 1940 Namibia
- Ozarba mallarba Swinhoe, 1885 India (Maharashtra)
- Ozarba marabensis Wiltshire, 1980 Arabia, Ethiopia
- Ozarba marthae Berio, 1940 Madagascar
- Ozarba megaplaga Hampson, 1910 Kenya, Eritrea, Gambia
- Ozarba melagona Hampson, 1910 Madagascar
- Ozarba melanodonta Hampson, 1910 Trinidad
- Ozarba melanographa (Hampson, 1916) Somalia
- Ozarba melanomaura Hacker, 2016 Tanzania
- Ozarba mesozonata Hampson, 1916 Arabia, Ethiopia, Somalia
- Ozarba metachrysea Hampson, 1910
- Ozarba metaleuca Hampson, 1910 Brazil (Amazonas)
- Ozarba metallica (Hampson, 1896) Sri Lanka
- Ozarba metaphora Hacker, 2016 Yemen
- Ozarba miary Viette, 1985 Madagascar
- Ozarba microcycla (Mabille, 1879) Madagascar
- Ozarba micropunctata Berio, 1959 Madagascar
- Ozarba moldavicola Herrich-Schäffer, [1851]
- Ozarba molybdota Hampson, 1910 Sri Lanka
- Ozarba morstatti Berio, 1938 Tanzania
- Ozarba mortua Berio, 1940 Eritrea, Ethiopia, Uganda, Tanzania
- Ozarba nairobiensis Berio, 1977 Kenya
- Ozarba naumanni Hacker, 2016 Ethiopia
- Ozarba nebula Barnes & McDunnough, 1918 Louisiana
- Ozarba negrottoi Berio, 1940 Somalia, Tanzania
- Ozarba nephroleuca Hampson, 1910 Madagascar
- Ozarba nicotrai Berio, 1950 Somalia, Ethiopia, Kenya, Tanzania
- Ozarba nigroviridis (Hampson, 1902) Eritrea, Ethiopia, Malawi, Tanzania, Mozambique, Botswana, Zambia, Zimbabwe, South Africa, Namibia
- Ozarba nyanza (Felder & Rogenhofer, 1874) Arabia, Ethiopia, Kenya, Tanzania, South Africa, Namibia, Madagascar
- Ozarba ochritincta Wileman & South, 1916 Taiwan
- Ozarba ochrizona (Hampson, 1910) Arabia
- Ozarba ochrozona Hampson, 1910 Ghana
- Ozarba olimcorniculans Berio, 1940 South Africa, Namibia
- Ozarba onytes Schaus, 1914 French Guiana
- Ozarba oplora Dyar, 1914 Panama
- Ozarba orthochrysea Hacker, 2016 Tanzania
- Ozarba orthogramma Hampson, 1914 Ghana, Niger, Nigeria, Cameroon, Sudan, Ethiopia
- Ozarba orthozona (Hampson, 1902) South Africa
- Ozarba ovata Berio, 1977 Zaire, Malawi, Tanzania
- Ozarba oxycampta Hacker, 2016 Madagascar
- Ozarba pallescens (Wiltshire, 1990) Arabia, Somalia, Kenya, Tanzania
- Ozarba pallida Hampson, 1910 India (Gajarat)
- Ozarba pallidicoloria Hacker, 2016 Namibia
- Ozarba parafricana Hacker, 2016 Angola
- Ozarba paraplaga Hacker, 2016 Ethiopia, Tanzania
- Ozarba parvula Berio, 1940
- Ozarba paulianae Viette, 1985
- Ozarba peraffinis Strand, 1920 Taiwan
- Ozarba permutata Hacker, 2016 Ethiopia, Nigeria
- Ozarba perplexa Saalmüller, 1891
- Ozarba perplexoides Hacker, 2016 Madagascar
- Ozarba persinua Berio, 1940 Namibia
- Ozarba pesinua Berio, 1940
- Ozarba phaea (Hampson, 1902) South Africa, Namibia, Arabia, Ethiopia, Kenya, Tanzania
- Ozarba phaeocroa Hampson, 1910 Zaire
- Ozarba phaeomera (Hampson, 1910) Nigeria
- Ozarba phlebitis Hampson, 1910 India (Uttar Pradesh), Pakistan, Oman, Cape Verde
- Ozarba plagifera (Rebel, 1907) Arabia, Sokotra, Eritrea, Ethiopia, Kenya, Malawi, Tanzania, South Africa
- Ozarba pluristriata Berio, 1937
- Ozarba postrufoides (Poole, 1989) Madagascar
- Ozarba prolai Berio, 1977
- Ozarba propera (Grote, 1882) Arizona
- Ozarba punctifascia Le Cerf, 1922 Kenya, Ethiopia
- Ozarba punctigera Walker, 1865 Nepal, Australia (Queensland)
- Ozarba punctithorax Berio, 1940
- Ozarba rectifascia (Hampson, 1894) India (Maharashtra)
- Ozarba rectificata Berio, 1950 India (Madhya Pradesh)
- Ozarba reducta Berio, 1940 India (Karnataka)
- Ozarba regia Warren, 1914 South Africa
- Ozarba reussi Strand, 1911
- Ozarba rosescens Hampson, 1910
- Ozarba rougeoti Berio, 1984 Djibouti
- Ozarba rubrivena Hampson, 1910 Cape Verde, Mali, Mauritania, Burkina Faso, Senegal, Togo, Gambia, Nigeria, Niger, Cameroon, Eritrea, Ethiopia, Kenya, Tanzania, Namibia
- Ozarba rubrofusca (Berio, 1947) Ethiopia
- Ozarba rufula Hampson, 1910 India (Gujarat), Ethiopia, Sudan
- Ozarba sancta Staudinger, 1900
- Ozarba schmiedelae Mey, 2011 South Africa, Namibia
- Ozarba schreieri (Hacker & Fibiger, 2006) Yemen
- Ozarba sciaphora Hampson, 1910 Mexico
- Ozarba scoliocampta Hacker, 2016 Madagascar
- Ozarba scorpio Berio, 1935
- Ozarba semiluctuosa Berio, 1937 Eritrea, Ethiopia, Somalia, Kenya, Arabia
- Ozarba semipotentia Dyar, 1914 Mexico
- Ozarba semipurpurea (Hampson, 1902) Eritrea, Ethiopia, Kenya, Tanzania, Zimbabwe, South Africa, Zaire
- Ozarba semirubra Hampson, 1910 India (Tamil Nadu)
- Ozarba semitorrida Hampson, 1916
- Ozarba separabilis Berio, 1940
- Ozarba simplex (Rebel, 1907) Sokotra
- Ozarba sinua Hampson, 1910 Eritrea, Ethiopia, Kenya, Angola, Namibia
- Ozarba socotrana Hampson, 1910 Arabia, Egypt, Eritrea, Sokotra, Zaire, Tanzania, South Africa
- Ozarba spectabilis Hacker, 2016 Kenya
- Ozarba squamicornis Dyar, 1918 Mexico
- Ozarba staudeana Hacker, 2016 South Africa
- Ozarba stenocampta Hacker, 2016 Madagascar
- Ozarba stenochra Hacker, 2016 Burkina Faseo, N.Nigeria, Kenya
- Ozarba strigipennis (Hampson, 1916) Somalia
- Ozarba subdentula Hampson, 1910 Sri Lanka
- Ozarba subterminalis Hampson, 1910
- Ozarba subtilimba Berio, 1963
- Ozarba subtilis Berio, 1966
- Ozarba subtusfimbriata Berio, 1940 South Africa
- Ozarba tacana Berio, 1977 Mexico
- Ozarba tamsina (Brandt, 1947) Iran, Pakistan, Arabia
- Ozarba tenuis Hacker, 2016 Ethiopia
- Ozarba terminipuncta (Hampson, 1899) Sokotra
- Ozarba terribilis Berio, 1940 Eritrea, Ethiopia, Kenya, Tanzania
- Ozarba tilora (Dyar, 1912) Mexico
- Ozarba timida Berio, 1940
- Ozarba topnaari Mey, 2011 Namibia
- Ozarba toxographa Hacker, 2016 Kenya, Tanzania
- Ozarba toxotis Hampson, 1910 Ethiopia, Malawi, Tanzania
- Ozarba transversa (Moore, [1884]) Sri Lanka
- Ozarba tricoloria Hacker & Saldaitis, 2016 Sokotra
- Ozarba tricornis Berio, 1977 Belize
- Ozarba tricuspis Hampson, 1910 Kenya
- Ozarba uberosa (Swinhoe, 1885) India (Maharashtra)
- Ozarba uhlenhuthi Hacker, 2016 Ethiopia
- Ozarba umbrifera Hampson, 1910 India (Gujarat)
- Ozarba unigena Hacker & Saldaitis, 2016 Sokotra
- Ozarba varia Walker, 1865
- Ozarba variabilis Berio, 1940 Egypt, Eritrea
- Ozarba variegata Le Cerf, 1911 Kenya
- Ozarba venata Butler, 1889 India (Hiamchal Pradesh)
- Ozarba vicina (Schaus, 1904) Brazil (São Paulo)
- Ozarba violascens (Hampson, 1910) Arabia, Eritrea, Kenya
- Ozarba wolframmeyi Hacker, 2016 Namibia
