= Scythris fissurella =

Scientific classification
- Kingdom: Animalia
- Phylum: Arthropoda
- Clade: Pancrustacea
- Class: Insecta
- Order: Lepidoptera
- Family: Scythrididae
- Genus: Scythris
- Species: S. fissurella

Binomial name
- Scythris fissurella Bengtsson, 1997

Species of moth

Scythris fissurella is a moth of the family Scythrididae. It was described by Bengt Å. Bengtsson in 1997. It is found in Cape Verde (Brava), Kenya, Sudan, Yemen, Oman, Pakistan, Afghanistan, and Iran. Records from Russia (Astrakhan region) and Kazakhstan refer to the related S. niemineni.

The larvae feed on Aerva javanica.
