= Scopula paneliusi =

Scientific classification
- Domain: Eukaryota
- Kingdom: Animalia
- Phylum: Arthropoda
- Class: Insecta
- Order: Lepidoptera
- Family: Geometridae
- Genus: Scopula
- Species: S. paneliusi

Binomial name
- Scopula paneliusi Herbulot, 1957

Species of geometer moth in subfamily Sterrhinae

Scopula paneliusi is a moth species of the family Geometridae first described by Claude Herbulot in 1957. It is endemic to Cape Verde.

== Subspecies ==
- Scopula paneliusi paneliusi Herbulot, 1957 (Cape Verde: Santo Antão, Santiago, Fogo)
- Scopula paneliusi subirrorata Herbulot, 1957 (Cape Verde: São Vicente, São Nicolau, Brava)
