= List of moths of Mauritania =

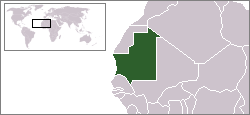
Location of Mauritania

Moths of Mauritania represent about 165 known moth species. The moths (mostly nocturnal) and butterflies (mostly diurnal) together make up the taxonomic order Lepidoptera.

This is a list of moth species which have been recorded in Mauritania.

== Arctiidae ==
- Utetheisa pulchella (Linnaeus, 1758)

== Cossidae ==
- Nomima prophanes Durrant, 1916

== Crambidae ==
- Filodes costivitralis Guenée, 1862

== Lasiocampidae ==
- Braura othello Zolotuhin & Gurkovich, 2009
- Odontocheilopteryx ferlina Gurkovich & Zolotuhin, 2009

== Noctuidae ==
- Abrostola confusa Dufay, 1958
- Acantholipes circumdata (Walker, 1858)
- Achaea catella Guenée, 1852
- Achaea lienardi (Boisduval, 1833)
- Acontia biskrensis Oberthür, 1887
- Acontia imitatrix Wallengren, 1856
- Acontia insocia (Walker, 1857)
- Acontia nigrimacula Hacker, Legrain & Fibiger, 2008
- Acontia opalinoides Guenée, 1852
- Acontia wahlbergi Wallengren, 1856
- Adisura callima Bethune-Baker, 1911
- Aegocera rectilinea Boisduval, 1836
- Agrotis biconica Kollar, 1844
- Agrotis herzogi Rebel, 1911
- Agrotis ipsilon (Hufnagel, 1766)
- Agrotis sardzeana Brandt, 1941
- Agrotis segetum ([Denis & Schiffermüller], 1775)
- Agrotis trux (Hübner, 1824)
- Amyna axis Guenée, 1852
- Amyna delicata Wiltshire, 1994
- Anarta trifolii (Hufnagel, 1766)
- Androlymnia clavata Hampson, 1910
- Antarchaea conicephala (Staudinger, 1870)
- Anumeta spilota (Erschoff, 1874)
- Argyrogramma signata (Fabricius, 1775)
- Aspidifrontia berioi Hacker & Hausmann, 2010
- Aspidifrontia hemileuca (Hampson, 1909)
- Aspidifrontia pallidula Hacker & Hausmann, 2010
- Aspidifrontia villiersi (Laporte, 1972)
- Asplenia melanodonta (Hampson, 1896)
- Attatha metaleuca Hampson, 1913
- Audea kathrina Kühne, 2005
- Audea melaleuca Walker, 1865
- Audea paulumnodosa Kühne, 2005
- Autoba teilhardi (de Joannis, 1909)
- Brevipecten confluens Hampson, 1926
- Brithys crini (Fabricius, 1775)
- Calliodes pretiosissima Holland, 1892
- Calophasia platyptera (Esper, [1788])
- Cardepia affinis Rothschild, 1913
- Cardepia sociabilis de Graslin, 1850
- Cerocala albicornis Berio, 1966
- Cerocala caelata Karsch, 1896
- Chalciope pusilla (Holland, 1894)
- Chasmina vestae (Guenée, 1852)
- Chrysodeixis acuta (Walker, [1858])
- Chrysodeixis chalcites (Esper, 1789)
- Clytie infrequens (Swinhoe, 1884)
- Clytie sancta (Staudinger, 1900)
- Clytie tropicalis Rungs, 1975
- Condica capensis (Guenée, 1852)
- Condica conducta (Walker, 1857)
- Condica viscosa (Freyer, 1831)
- Crypsotidia maculifera (Staudinger, 1898)
- Crypsotidia remanei Wiltshire, 1977
- Cyligramma fluctuosa (Drury, 1773)
- Cyligramma magus (Guérin-Méneville, [1844])
- Diparopsis watersi (Rothschild, 1901)
- Drasteria kabylaria (Bang-Haas, 1906)
- Dysgonia torrida (Guenée, 1852)
- Eublemma baccalix (Swinhoe, 1886)
- Eublemma ecthaemata Hampson, 1896
- Eublemma gayneri (Rothschild, 1901)
- Eublemma parva (Hübner, [1808])
- Eublemma ragusana (Freyer, 1844)
- Eublemma robertsi Berio, 1969
- Eublemma scitula (Rambur, 1833)
- Eublemma tytrocoides Hacker & Hausmann, 2010
- Eublemmoides apicimacula (Mabille, 1880)
- Eutelia polychorda Hampson, 1902
- Gesonia obeditalis Walker, 1859
- Gnamptonyx innexa (Walker, 1858)
- Grammodes congenita Walker, 1858
- Grammodes stolida (Fabricius, 1775)
- Haplocestra similis Aurivillius, 1910
- Helicoverpa armigera (Hübner, [1808])
- Helicoverpa assulta (Guenée, 1852)
- Heliocheilus confertissima (Walker, 1865)
- Heliothis nubigera Herrich-Schäffer, 1851
- Heliothis peltigera ([Denis & Schiffermüller], 1775)
- Heteropalpia acrosticta (Püngeler, 1904)
- Heteropalpia exarata (Mabille, 1890)
- Hypena laceratalis Walker, 1859
- Hypena lividalis (Hübner, 1790)
- Hypena obacerralis Walker, [1859]
- Hypocala rostrata (Fabricius, 1794)
- Hypotacha ochribasalis (Hampson, 1896)
- Iambia jansei Berio, 1966
- Leoniloma convergens Hampson, 1926
- Leucania loreyi (Duponchel, 1827)
- Marathyssa cuneata (Saalmüller, 1891)
- Masalia albiseriata (Druce, 1903)
- Masalia bimaculata (Moore, 1888)
- Masalia nubila (Hampson, 1903)
- Masalia rubristria (Hampson, 1903)
- Maxera nigriceps (Walker, 1858)
- Melanephia nigrescens (Wallengren, 1856)
- Metachrostis quinaria (Moore, 1881)
- Metopoceras kneuckeri (Rebel, 1903)
- Mitrophrys magna (Walker, 1854)
- Mythimna languida (Walker, 1858)
- Mythimna umbrigera (Saalmüller, 1891)
- Ophiusa mejanesi (Guenée, 1852)
- Ophiusa tirhaca (Cramer, 1777)
- Oraesia intrusa (Krüger, 1939)
- Ozarba rubrivena Hampson, 1910
- Ozarba subtilimba Berio, 1963
- Ozarba variabilis Berio, 1940
- Pandesma muricolor Berio, 1966
- Pandesma robusta (Walker, 1858)
- Parachalciope benitensis (Holland, 1894)
- Pericyma mendax (Walker, 1858)
- Pericyma metaleuca Hampson, 1913
- Plecopterodes moderata (Wallengren, 1860)
- Polydesma umbricola Boisduval, 1833
- Polytela cliens (Felder & Rogenhofer, 1874)
- Polytelodes florifera (Walker, 1858)
- Prionofrontia ochrosia Hampson, 1926
- Pseudozarba bipartita (Herrich-Schäffer, 1950)
- Rhabdophera arefacta (Swinhoe, 1884)
- Rhabdophera clathrum (Guenée, 1852)
- Rhabdophera hansali (Felder & Rogenhofer, 1874)
- Rhynchina leucodonta Hampson, 1910
- Sesamia nonagrioides (Lefèbvre, 1827)
- Sphingomorpha chlorea (Cramer, 1777)
- Spodoptera cilium Guenée, 1852
- Spodoptera exempta (Walker, 1857)
- Spodoptera exigua (Hübner, 1808)
- Spodoptera littoralis (Boisduval, 1833)
- Tachosa fumata (Wallengren, 1860)
- Tathorhynchus exsiccata (Lederer, 1855)
- Thiacidas meii Hacker & Zilli, 2007
- Trichoplusia ni (Hübner, [1803])
- Trichoplusia orichalcea (Fabricius, 1775)
- Tytroca leucoptera (Hampson, 1896)
- Ulotrichopus primulina (Hampson, 1902)
- Ulotrichopus tinctipennis (Hampson, 1902)

== Nolidae ==
- Arcyophora patricula (Hampson, 1902)
- Bryophilopsis tarachoides Mabille, 1900
- Earias biplaga Walker, 1866
- Earias insulana (Boisduval, 1833)
- Leocyma appollinis Guenée, 1852
- Meganola reubeni Agassiz, 2009
- Neaxestis mesogonia (Hampson, 1905)
- Negeta luminosa (Walker, 1858)
- Negeta purpurascens Hampson, 1912
- Odontestis striata Hampson, 1912
- Pardoxia graellsii (Feisthamel, 1837)
- Xanthodes albago (Fabricius, 1794)
- Xanthodes brunnescens (Pinhey, 1968)

== Pterophoridae ==
- Agdistis tamaricis (Zeller, 1847)

== Pyralidae ==
- Hypotia numidalis Hampson, 1900)

== Tineidae ==
- Anomalotinea cubiculella (Staudinger, 1859)
- Ceratophaga infuscatella (de Joannis, 1897)
- Infurcitinea marcunella (Rebel, 1901)
- Myrmecozela lambessella Rebel, 1901
- Perissomastix agenjoi (Petersen, 1957)
- Perissomastix biskraella (Rebel, 1901)
- Rhodobates algiricella (Rebel, 1901)
- Trichophaga bipartitella (Ragonot, 1892)

== Tortricidae ==
- Epinotia hesperidana Kennel, 1921
