= Acontia coquillettii =

Scientific classification
- Domain: Eukaryota
- Kingdom: Animalia
- Phylum: Arthropoda
- Class: Insecta
- Order: Lepidoptera
- Superfamily: Noctuoidea
- Family: Noctuidae
- Tribe: Acontiini
- Genus: Acontia
- Species: A. coquillettii

Binomial name
- Acontia coquillettii Smith, 1900

Species of moth

Acontia coquillettii is a species of bird dropping moth in the family Noctuidae. It is found in North America.

The MONA or Hodges number for Acontia coquillettii is 9163.

== Description ==
The A. coquillettii is a pure white moth, with a FW length of 9-10mm, with grey and olive markings on the distal forewing. The hindwing is grey with a light fringe (the hairs that border the wing). Its markings closely resemble its relative, Enterpia laudeti.

== Distribution and habitat ==
The A. coquillettii is found near the Snake River in Malheur County, Oregon, as well as much of California.

== Behavior ==
Like other moths, the species A. coquillettii is nocturnal and attracted to lights.
