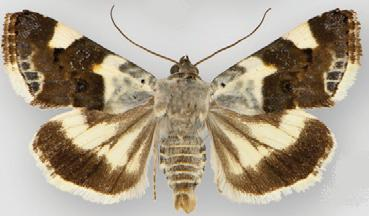
- Acontia lucida

Scientific classification
- Kingdom: Animalia
- Phylum: Arthropoda
- Clade: Pancrustacea
- Class: Insecta
- Order: Lepidoptera
- Superfamily: Noctuoidea
- Family: Noctuidae
- Tribe: Acontiini
- Genus: Acontia; Ochsenheimer, 1816

Synonyms
- Desmophora Stephens, 1829; Euphasia Stephens, 1830; Heliothera Sodoffsky, 1837; Porrotha Gistl, 1848; Tima Walker, [1858]; Metapioplasta Wallengren, 1865; Hoplotarache Hampson, 1910; Cardiosace Hampson, 1910; Aulotarache Hampson, 1910; Stylorache Hampson, 1910; Procriosis Hampson, 1910; Chelichares Hampson, 1910; Rhodotarache Warren, 1914; Fredina Brandt, 1939; Ascopserotarache Berio; Uracontia Beck, 1996; Acontarache Berio, 1977; Emmelacontia Beck, 2000

= Acontia =

Genus of moths

Acontia is a genus of moths of the family Noctuidae. The genus was named by Ferdinand Ochsenheimer in 1816. Eusceptis, Pseudalypia and Spragueia are sometimes included in the present genus, but here they are tentatively treated as different pending further research. Many species of Tarache were also once placed here (see below).

== Description ==
Palpi long, porrect (extending forward) and met by a short sharp frontal tuft. Third joint prominent. Antennae simple. Thorax and abdomen smoothly scaled and tuftless. Forewings with non-crenulate cilia. Veins 7, 8 and 9, 10 stalked. Larva possess four abdominal prolegs.

== Species ==
- Acontia albida (Hampson, 1910)
- Acontia albinigra Warren, 1913
- Acontia antecedens Walker, 1869
- Acontia antica Walker, 1862
- Acontia apatelia Swinhoe, 1907
- Acontia ardoris Hübner, [1827-1831]
- Acontia areletta Dyar, 1907
- Acontia asbenensis Rothschild, 1921
- Acontia basifera Walker, [1858]
- Acontia behrii Smith, 1900
- Acontia bicolora Leech, 1889
- Acontia bilimeki Felder & Rogenhofer, 1874
- Acontia biskrensis Oberthür, 1887
- Acontia brabanti Le Cerf, 1911
- Acontia briola Holland, 1894
- Acontia buchanani Rothschild, 1921
- Acontia caffraria Cramer, [1777]
- Acontia carnescens Hampson, 1910
- Acontia catenula Walker, 1865
- Acontia chea Druce, 1898 (syn: Acontia eudryada Smith, 1905)
- Acontia chia Holland, 1894
- Acontia chrysoproctis Hampson, 1902
- Acontia citripennis Hampson, 1910
- Acontia clerana Lower, 1902
- Acontia coquillettii Smith, 1900
- Acontia costistigma Walker, [1858]
- Acontia costosa Mabille, 1899
- Acontia crassivalva Wiltshire, 1947
- Acontia cratina Druce, 1889
- Acontia cretata Grote & Robinson, 1870 – chalky bird-dropping moth
- Acontia crocata Guenée, 1852
- Acontia cuprina Walker, [1863]
- Acontia cyanipha Lower, 1897
- Acontia cyanocraspi Hampson, 1910
- Acontia damia Druce, 1889
- Acontia decisa Walker, [1858]
- Acontia delphinensis Viette, 1968
- Acontia destricta Draudt, 1936
- Acontia detrita Butler, 1886
- Acontia dichroa Hampson, 1914
- Acontia discoidea Hopffer, 1858
- Acontia disrupta Warren, 1913
- Acontia elaeoa Hampson, 1910
- Acontia euschema Turner, 1920
- Acontia feae (Berio, 1937)
- Acontia fiebrigi Zerny, 1916
- Acontia flavonigra Swinhoe, 1884
- Acontia gagites Warren, 1913
- Acontia gloriosa (Kenrick, 1917)
- Acontia gradata Walker, [1858]
- Acontia gratiosa Wallengren, 1856
- Acontia guttifera Felder & Rogenhofer, 1874
- Acontia hemiglauca Hampson, 1910
- Acontia hemipentha Wiltshire, 1947
- Acontia hemixanthia Hampson, 1910
- Acontia hortensis Swinhoe, 1884
- Acontia imitatrix Wallengren, 1856
- Acontia interposita Dyar, 1912
- Acontia isolata Todd, 1960
- Acontia jaliscana Schaus, 1898
- Acontia leucotrigona Hampson, 1905
- Acontia lucida Hufnagel, 1766
- Acontia luteola Saalmüller, 1891
- Acontia malagasy Viette, 1965
- Acontia malgassica Mabille, 1881
- Acontia margaritana Drury, 1782
- Acontia marmoralis Fabricius, 1794
- Acontia mekki Rungs, 1953
- Acontia mesoleucoides Poole, 1989
- Acontia micrasti Lower, 1903
- Acontia micropis Druce, 1909
- Acontia microptera Mabille, 1879
- Acontia miegii Mabille, 1882
- Acontia miogona Hampson, 1916
- Acontia mizteca Schaus, 1898
- Acontia morides Schaus, 1894
- Acontia nephata Bethune-Baker, 1911
- Acontia neurota Lower, 1903
- Acontia niphogona Hampson, 1909
- Acontia nitidula Fabricius, 1787
- Acontia nivipicta Butler, 1886
- Acontia notabilis Walker, 1857
- Acontia nubifera (Hampson, 1910)
- Acontia nubilata Hampson, 1902
- Acontia ochrochroa Druce, 1909
- Acontia olivacea Hampson, 1891
- Acontia opalinoides Guenée, 1852
- Acontia parana E. D. Jones, 1921
- Acontia partita Walker, 1870
- Acontia pauliani Viette, 1965
- Acontia phaenna Druce, 1889
- Acontia phrygionis Hampson, 1910
- Acontia polychroma Walker, 1869
- Acontia porphyrea Butler, 1898
- Acontia psaliphora Hampson, 1910
- Acontia quadrata Walker, 1866
- Acontia rachiastis Hampson, 1908
- Acontia rufescens Hampson, 1910
- Acontia ruffinellii Biezanko, 1959
- Acontia ruficinta Hampson, 1910
- Acontia rufitincta Hampson, 1910
- Acontia secta Guenée, 1852
- Acontia seminigra Rebel, 1947
- Acontia sexpunctata Fabricius, 1794
- Acontia spangbergi Aurivillius, 1879
- Acontia sphaerophora Hampson, 1914
- Acontia stumpffi Saalmüller, 1891
- Acontia subarabica Wiltshire, 1982
- Acontia sublimbata Berio, 1984
- Acontia tetragonisa Hampson, 1910
- Acontia thapsina Turner, 1902
- Acontia tinctilis Wallengren, 1875
- Acontia titania Esper, 1798
- Acontia transfigurata Wallengren, 1856
- Acontia trimacula Saalmüller, 1891
- Acontia umbrigera Felder & Rogenhofer, 1874
- Acontia urania Frivaldszky, 1836
- Acontia vaualbum Hampson, 1914
- Acontia venita Schaus, 1904
- Acontia viridifera (Hampson, 1910)
- Acontia vittamargo Dyar, 1912
- Acontia wahlbergi Wallengren, 1856
- Acontia wallengreni Aurivillius, 1879
- Acontia yemenensis Hampson, 1918
- Acontia zelleri Wallengren, 1856

== Former species transferred to Tarache ==
The following species were recently transferred to the genus Tarache:

- Acontia abdominalis Grote, 1877
- Acontia acerba (H. Edwards, 1881) (syn: Acontia acerboides Poole, 1989)
- Acontia albifusa Ferris & Lafontaine, 2009
- Acontia apela Druce, 1889
- Acontia aprica Hübner, [1808]
- Acontia areli Strecker, 1898
- Acontia areloides Barnes & McDunnough, 1912
- Acontia arida Smith, 1900
- Acontia assimilis Grote, 1875
- Acontia expolita Grote, 1882
- Acontia bella Barnes & Benjamin, 1922
- Acontia bilimeki (Felder & Rogenhofer, 1874) (syn: Acontia disconnecta Smith, 1903)
- Acontia cora Barnes & McDunnough, 1918
- Acontia dacia Druce, 1889
- Acontia delecta Walker, [1858]
- Acontia flavipennis Grote, 1873
- Acontia geminocula Ferris & Lafontaine, 2009
- Acontia knowltoni McDunnough, 1940
- Acontia lactipennis Harvey, 1875
- Acontia lagunae (Mustelin & Leuschner, 2000)
- Acontia lanceolata Grote, 1879
- Acontia lucasi Smith, 1900
- Acontia major Smith, 1900
- Acontia quadriplaga Smith, 1900
- Acontia sedata H. Edwards, 1881
- Acontia sutor Hampson, 1910
- Acontia tenuicula Morrison, 1875
- Acontia terminimaculata Grote, 1873
- Acontia tetragona Walker, [1858]
- Acontia toddi Ferris & Lafontaine, 2009

== Former species ==
- Acontia discalis Walker, 1865
