= Clytie scotorrhiza =

Scientific classification
- Kingdom: Animalia
- Phylum: Arthropoda
- Class: Insecta
- Order: Lepidoptera
- Superfamily: Noctuoidea
- Family: Erebidae
- Genus: Clytie
- Species: C. scotorrhiza

Binomial name
- Clytie scotorrhiza Hampson, 1913

Synonyms
- Clytie scotorrhiza orthomelaina

Species of moth

Clytie scotorrhiza is a moth of the family Erebidae first described by George Hampson in 1913. It is found in Israel, the Sinai, Egypt and Saudi Arabia.

There is probably one generation per year. Adults are on wing from October to April.

The larvae probably feed on Tamarix species, including Tamarix aphyla.
