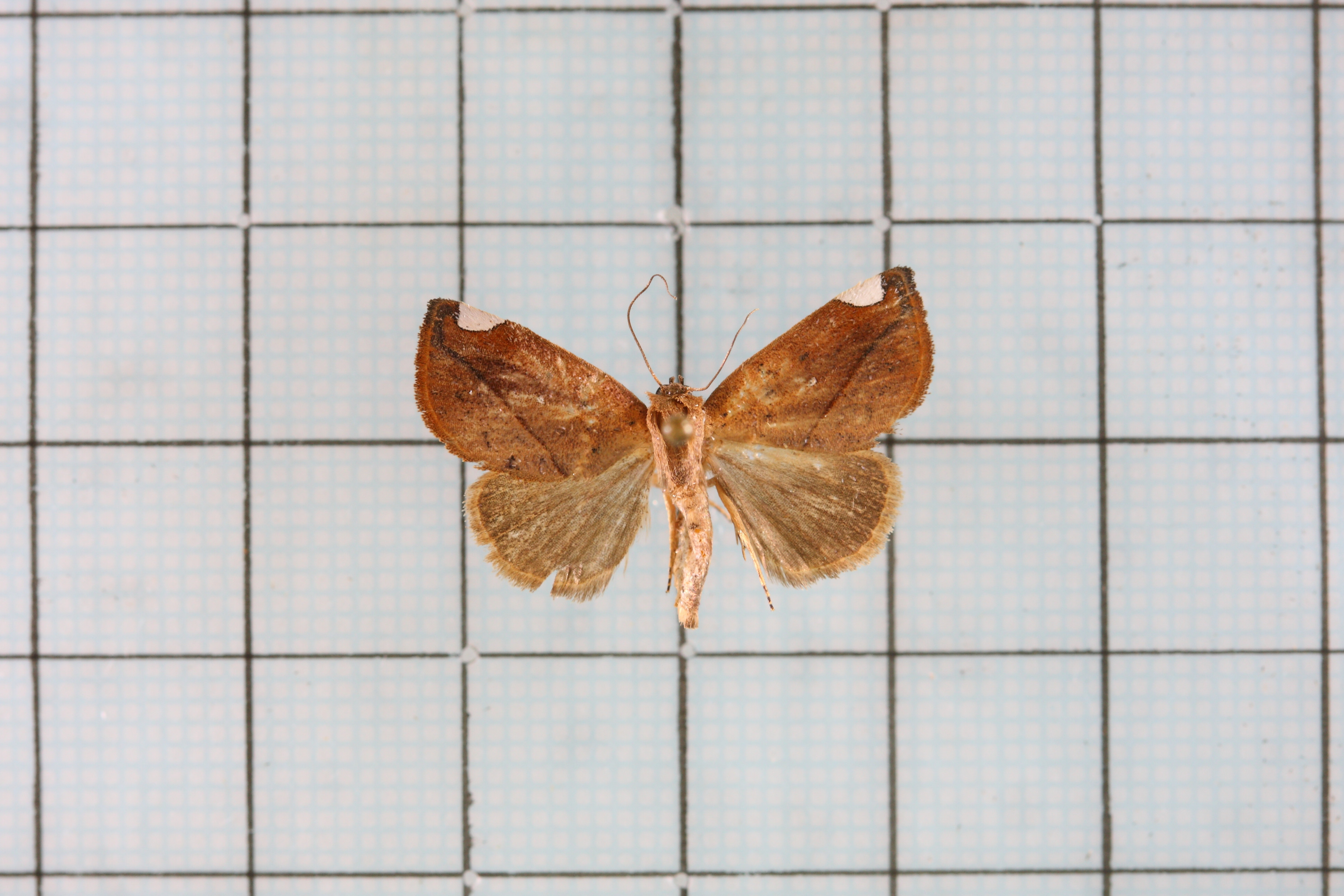
- Negeta contrariata

Scientific classification
- Kingdom: Animalia
- Phylum: Arthropoda
- Class: Insecta
- Order: Lepidoptera
- Superfamily: Noctuoidea
- Family: Nolidae
- Subfamily: Chloephorinae
- Genus: Negeta; Walker, 1862

Synonyms
- Doranaga

= Negeta =

Genus of moths

Negeta is a genus of moths of the family Nolidae first described by Francis Walker in 1862.

== Description ==
Palpi reaching just above vertex of head and very slender. Thorax smoothly scaled. Abdomen with dorsal tuft at base. Tibia not hairy. Forewings short and broad, with arched costa and inner margin. Outer margin angled. Veins 8,9,10 stalked. Hindwings with vein 5 from near lower angle of cell.

== Species ==
- Negeta abbreviata (Walker, 1862)
- Negeta albigrisea (Hampson, 1910)
- Negeta albiplagiata Hampson, 1918
- Negeta approximans Hampson, 1912
- Negeta argentula Viete, 1976
- Negeta aureata Holloway, 2003
- Negeta cinerascens (Holland, 1894)
- Negeta contrariata Walker, 1862
- Negeta cyrtogramma Prout, 1927
- Negeta ecclipsis (Holland, 1894)
- Negeta incisurata Gaede, 1916
- Negeta luminosa (Walker, 1858)
- Negeta mesoleuca (Holland, 1894)
- Negeta molybdota Hampson, 1912
- Negeta montanata Holloway, 2003
- Negeta noloides Draudt, 1950
- Negeta nubilicosta (Holland, 1894)
- Negeta ochreoplaga (Bethune-Baker, 1909)
- Negeta ochrichalceaarcuata Gaede, 1916
- Negeta olivaria (Warren, 1916)
- Negeta phaeopepla (Hampson, 1905)
- Negeta purpurascens Hampson, 1912
- Negeta reticulata (Berio, 1964)
- Negeta ruficeps (Hampson, 1902)
- Negeta secretaria Bryk, 1913
- Negeta semialba Hampson, 1918
- Negeta soliera (Swinhoe, 1895)
- Negeta stalactitis (Hampson, 1905)
- Negeta straminea (Hampson, 1891)
- Negeta ulula Bryk, 1913
