= Acontia dichroa =

Scientific classification
- Kingdom: Animalia
- Phylum: Arthropoda
- Class: Insecta
- Order: Lepidoptera
- Superfamily: Noctuoidea
- Family: Noctuidae
- Genus: Acontia
- Species: A. dichroa

Binomial name
- Acontia dichroa Hampson, 1914

Species of moth

Acontia dichroa is a species of moth in the family Noctuidae. It was originally described by George Hampson in 1914.

== Description ==
The wingspan is approximately 26mm (1.02 in).

It was previously termed Tarache dichroa. It is also synonymous with Tarache seminigra (Rebel 1947).

== Morphology ==
Individuals are characterized by elongated palpi having a pointed frontal tuft, and a well developed third segment. Antennae are simple and filiform, having no complex modifications or branches. Both the thorax and abdomen are covered in smooth scales, lacking tufts or patches. The forewing is bordered with non-crenulate cilia, and plain unnotched fringe along the edges. In terms of venation, veins 7 to 10 are stalked. The larval stage is characterized by the presence of four pairs of abdominal prolegs.

== Distribution ==
It has been recorded in northeastern Africa (Djibouti, Ethiopia, Sudan, Egypt), East Africa (Kenya, Tanzania), the Arabian Peninsula (Saudi Arabia, Yemen) and parts of India.
