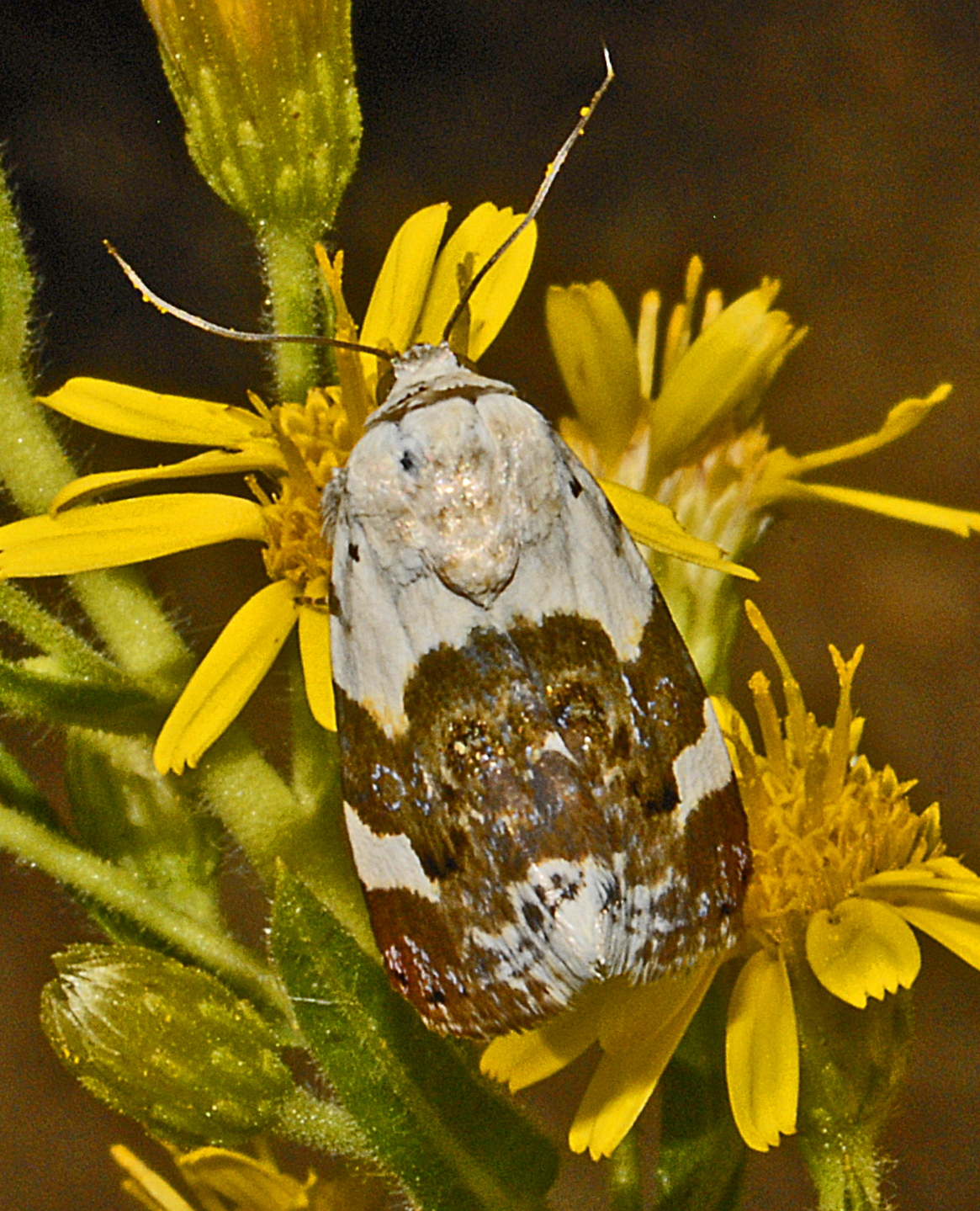
- Dorsal view

Scientific classification
- Kingdom: Animalia
- Phylum: Arthropoda
- Class: Insecta
- Order: Lepidoptera
- Superfamily: Noctuoidea
- Family: Noctuidae
- Genus: Acontia
- Species: A. lucida

Binomial name
- Acontia lucida (Hufnagel, 1766)

Synonyms
- List: Phalaena lucida Hufnagel, 1766; Noctua solaris [Schiffermüller], 1775; Noctua albicollis Fabricius, 1781; Phalaena Noctua rupicola Borkhausen, 1792; Noctua insolatrix Hübner, [1822]; Acontia triradiata Walker, [1858]; Acontia lucida var. triangulum Costa, 1882; Acontia lucida var. lugens Alpheraky, 1889; Acontia lucida f. mediofasciata Stauder, 1923; Tarache (Acontia) lucida var. heliodora Schawerda, 1924

= Acontia lucida =

Pale shoulder

Species of moth

Acontia lucida, the pale shoulder, is a moth of the family Noctuidae. The species was first described by Johann Siegfried Hufnagel in 1766.

== Distribution and habitat ==
This species can be found in most of Europe, east to Turkey, Iran and India. It has also been recorded from Algeria. It is a rare migrant to the south coast of Great Britain. The pale shoulder can be found in grasslands, dry meadows, steppes, dunes and roadsides, where the host plants are present.

== Description ==
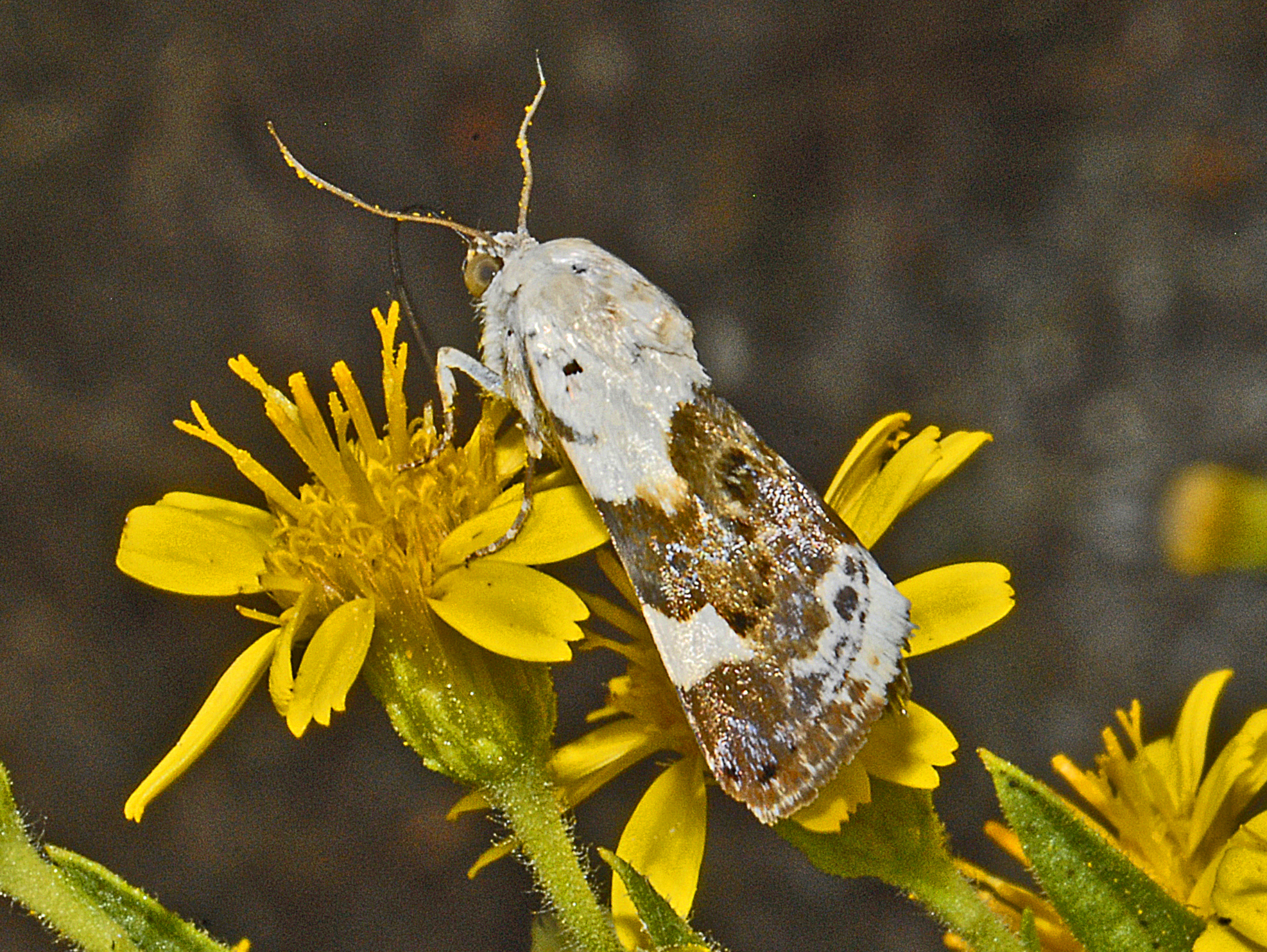
Lateral view

The wingspan of Acontia lucida can reach 26–30 mm. Head, thorax and abdomen are white. The forewings show a greyish-white front part and a wide dark brown median band, dark mottled and marbled, larger in the centre. A white mark is present on the outer edge of the forewings, while a brown mark is close to the apex. Hindwings are whitish fuscous, with a brown band near the apex. Larvae are green or brown, with transversal whitish bands.

== Biology ==
The larvae are polyphagous, feeding on various herbaceous plants, mainly on mallow (Malva species), common marshmallow (Althaea officinalis), field bindweed (Convolvulus arvensis), goosefoots (Chenopodium) and dandelion (Taraxacum). Adults are on the wing on sunny days in May and August in two generations. They are attracted to light. This species overwinters as pupa below ground. Rarely it is a migrant species.

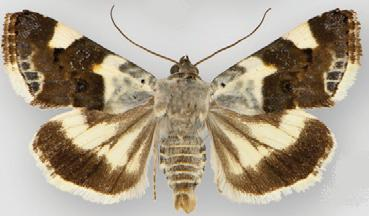
Mounted specimen
