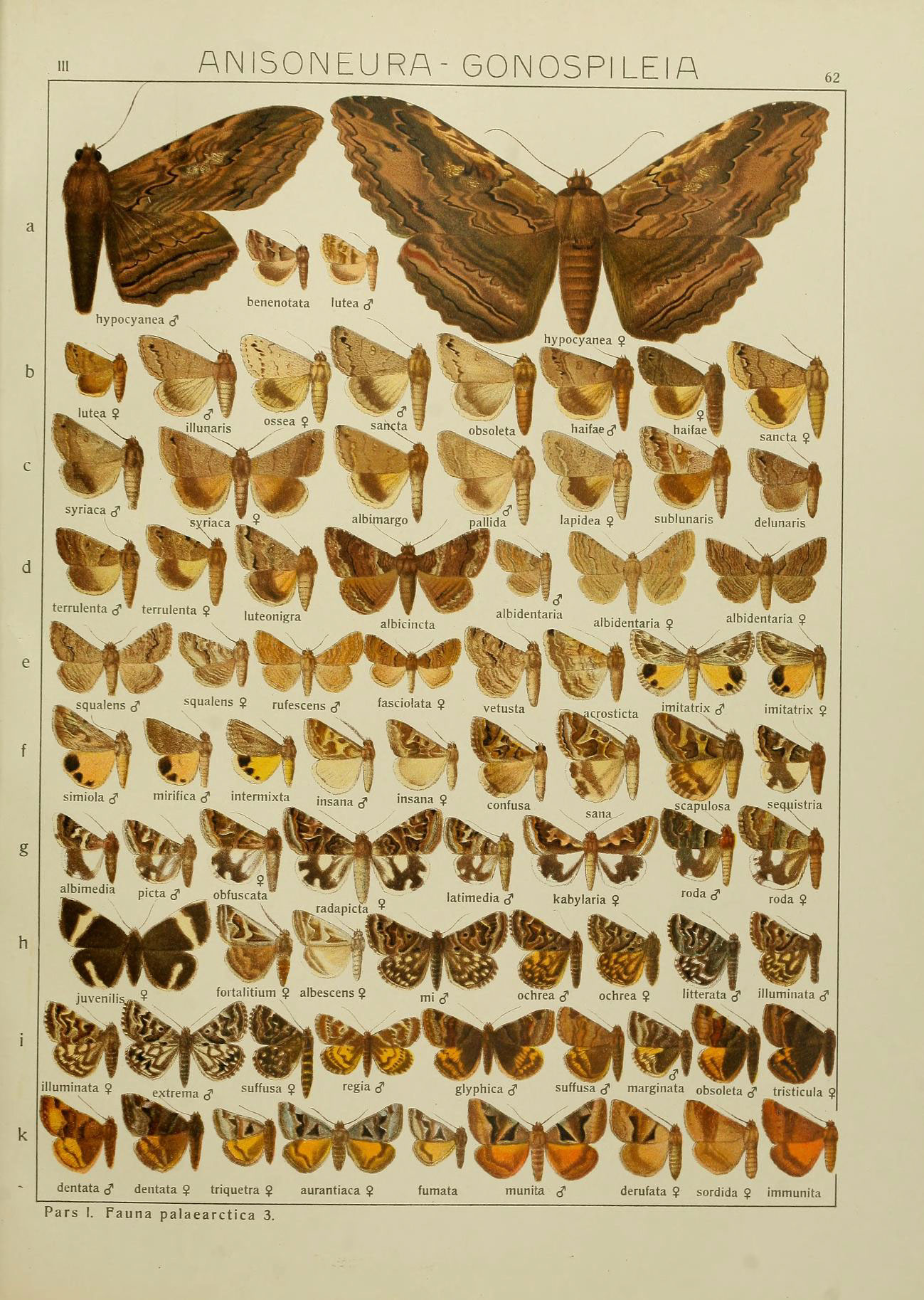
- Clytie illunaris in Seitz figure 62b

Scientific classification
- Kingdom: Animalia
- Phylum: Arthropoda
- Class: Insecta
- Order: Lepidoptera
- Superfamily: Noctuoidea
- Family: Erebidae
- Genus: Clytie
- Species: C. illunaris

Binomial name
- Clytie illunaris (Hübner, 1813)

Synonyms
- Noctua illunaris Hübner, [1813]; Clytie canaris

= Clytie illunaris =

Species of moth

Clytie illunaris is a moth of the family Erebidae first described by Jacob Hübner in 1813. It is found in France, Spain, North Africa and the Arabian Peninsula.

== Technical description and variation ==
Clytie illunaris Hbn. (= gracilis B.-Haas.) (62 b). Forewing grey, or dark ash grey, or, more rarely, pale bone colour; inner and outer lines blackish, very seldom clear, often interrupted, or even altogether absent; submarginal line pale, only visible in the dark grey examples, always preceded by a black irregularly zigzag line, not reaching costa but blackest below it; orbicular stigma a faint dark dot; reniform a pale figure of 8, often divided into two spots; hindwing pale grey or bone colour, with a broad diffuse grey submarginal band, always darker and better defined in the female; the pale bone colour forms may be separated as ab. ossea ab. nov. (= ab. 2 Hmps.) (62 b); in ab. brunnea ab. nov. (= ab. 1 Hmps.) the ground colour of forewing is brown, the markings equally obsolete; while in ab. obscura ab. nov. (= ab. 3 Hmps.) the forewing, except at base of inner margin, is suffused with red brown, the subterminal line alone being visible.

== Subspecies ==
- Clytie illunaris illunaris
- Clytie illunaris legraini

== Biology ==
There are multiple generations per year.

The larvae feed on Tamarix species, including Tamarix gallica.
