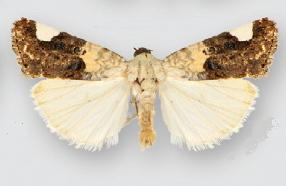
- Male

Scientific classification
- Domain: Eukaryota
- Kingdom: Animalia
- Phylum: Arthropoda
- Class: Insecta
- Order: Lepidoptera
- Superfamily: Noctuoidea
- Family: Noctuidae
- Genus: Acontia
- Species: A. areletta

Binomial name
- Acontia areletta Dyar, 1907

= Acontia areletta =

Species of moth

Acontia areletta is a moth of the family Noctuidae. The species was first described by Harrison Gray Dyar Jr. in 1907. It is found in Mexico.

The length of the forewings is 12–14 mm for both males and females. Adults are on wing from October to November depending on the location.

== Morphology ==
Acontia species are characterized by an elongated palpi having pointed frontal tuft, and a well developed third segment. Antennae are simple and filiform, having no complex modifications or branches. Both the thorax and abdomen are covered in smooth scales, lacking tufts or patches. The forewing is bordered with non-crenulate cilia, and plain unnotched fringe along the edges. In terms of venation, veins 7 to 10 are stalked. The larval stage is characterized by the presence of four pairs of abdominal prolegs.
