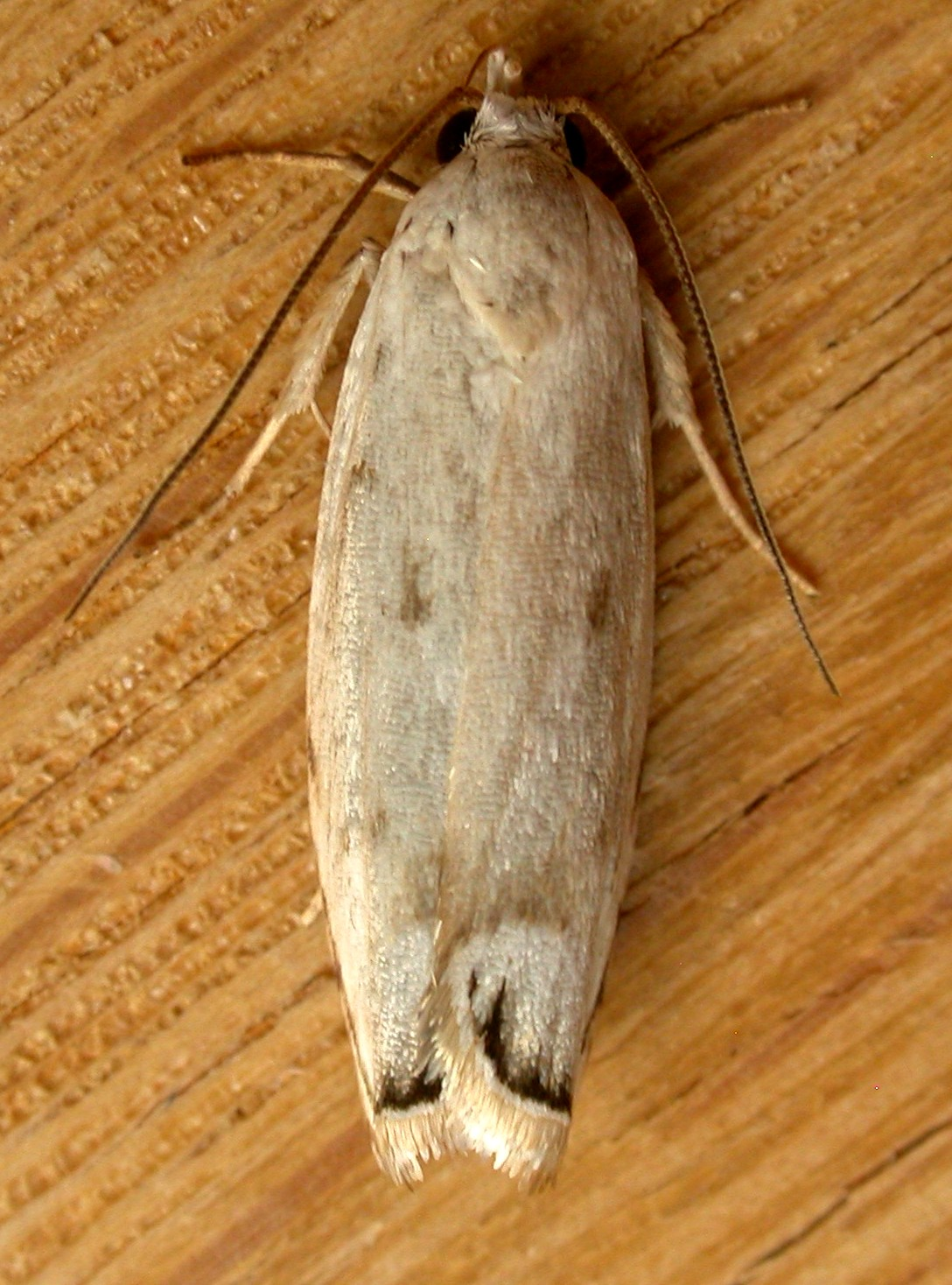
- Plectophila discalis

Scientific classification
- Domain: Eukaryota
- Kingdom: Animalia
- Phylum: Arthropoda
- Class: Insecta
- Order: Lepidoptera
- Family: Xyloryctidae
- Genus: Plectophila; Meyrick, 1890

Type species
- Oecophora electella Walker, 1864

= Plectophila =

Moth genus in family Xyloryctidae

Plectophila is a genus of moths of the family Xyloryctidae.

== Species ==
As of 2018, Plectophila includes the following species:

- Plectophila acrochroa (Turner, 1900)
- Plectophila discalis (Walker, 1865)
- Plectophila electella (Walker, 1864)
- Plectophila eucrines (Turner, 1898)
- Plectophila micradelpha (Turner, 1898)
- Plectophila placocosma Lower, 1893
- Plectophila pyrgodes Turner, 1898
- Plectophila sarculata Lucas, 1901
- Plectophila thiophanes (Turner, 1917)
- Plectophila thrasycosma (Meyrick, 1915)
