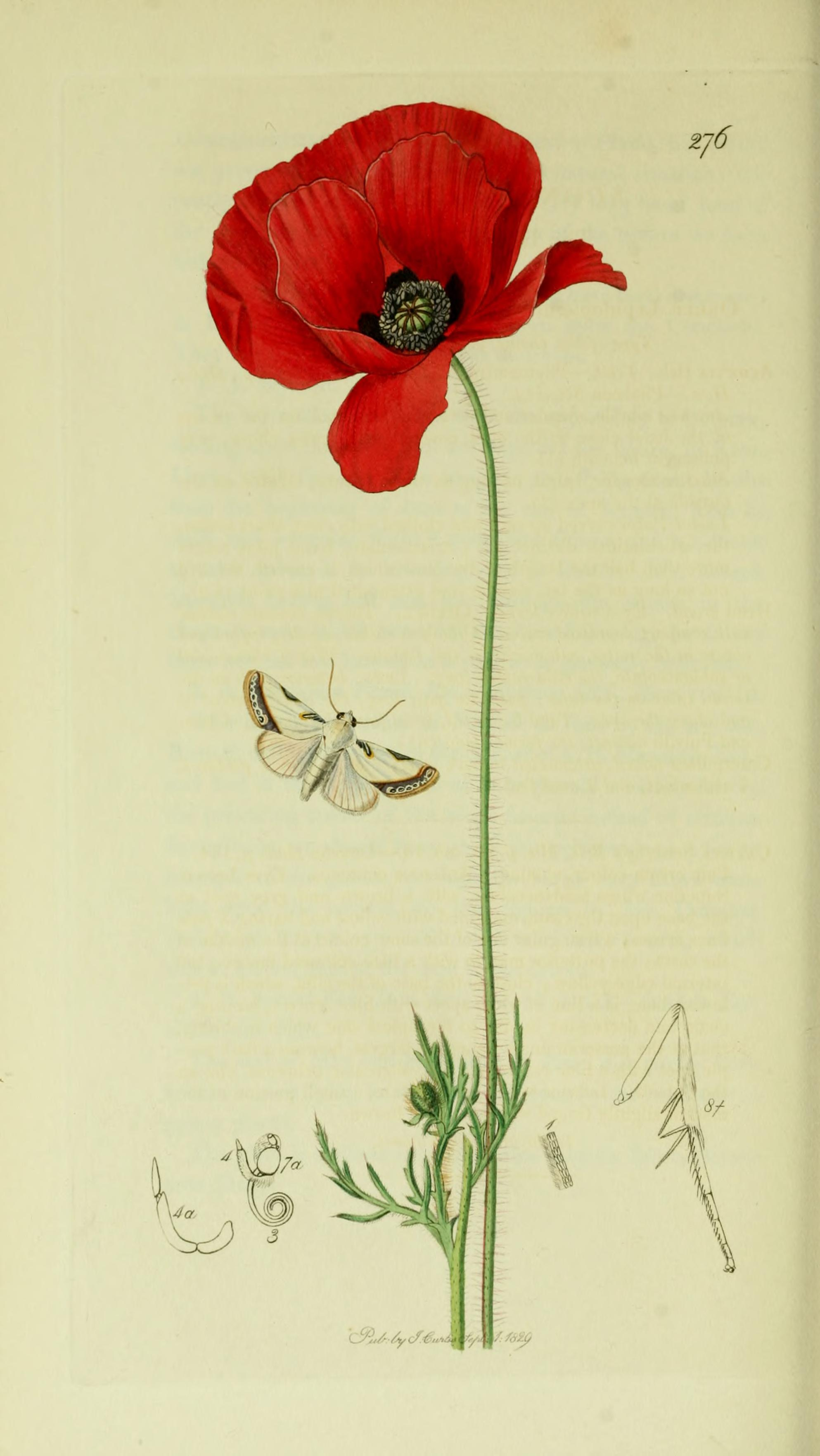
- Illustration from John Curtis's British Entomology Volume 5

Scientific classification
- Domain: Eukaryota
- Kingdom: Animalia
- Phylum: Arthropoda
- Class: Insecta
- Order: Lepidoptera
- Superfamily: Noctuoidea
- Family: Noctuidae
- Genus: Acontia
- Species: A. nitidula

Binomial name
- Acontia nitidula (Fabricius, 1787)

Synonyms
- Bombyx nitidula Fabricius, 1787; Phalaena catena Sowerby, 1805; Desmophora elegans Stephens, 1829 (replacement name for Phalaena catena Sowerby, 1805)

= Acontia nitidula =

Species of moth

Acontia nitidula, the Brixton beauty, is a moth of the family Noctuidae. The species was first described by Johan Christian Fabricius in 1787. It is found in South Africa, Europe, China, Japan and throughout India and Sri Lanka. It has also been recorded from Great Britain, but this record is doubtful.

The larvae feed on the leaves of Abelmoschus esculentus and cotton and are considered a minor pest.
