= Acontia chea =

Scientific classification
- Domain: Eukaryota
- Kingdom: Animalia
- Phylum: Arthropoda
- Class: Insecta
- Order: Lepidoptera
- Superfamily: Noctuoidea
- Family: Noctuidae
- Tribe: Acontiini
- Genus: Acontia
- Species: A. chea

Binomial name
- Acontia chea Druce, 1889

Synonyms
- Acontia eudryada Smith, 1905

Species of moth

Acontia chea is a species of bird dropping moth in the family Noctuidae. It is found in North America.

The MONA or Hodges number for Acontia chea is 9160.

== Morphology ==
Acontia species are characterized by an elongated palpi having pointed frontal tuft, and a well developed third segment. Antennae are simple and filiform, having no complex modifications or branches. Both the thorax and abdomen are covered in smooth scales, lacking tufts or patches. The forewing is bordered with non-crenulate cilia, and plain unnotched fringe along the edges. In terms of venation, veins 7 to 10 are stalked. The larval stage is characterized by the presence of four pairs of abdominal prolegs.
