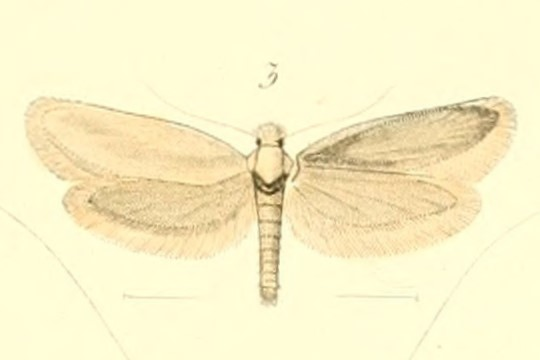
- Anomalotinea cubiculella

Scientific classification
- Kingdom: Animalia
- Phylum: Arthropoda
- Clade: Pancrustacea
- Class: Insecta
- Order: Lepidoptera
- Family: Tineidae
- Subfamily: Tineinae
- Genus: Anomalotinea; Spuler, 1910

= Anomalotinea =

Genus of moths

Anomalotinea is a genus of moths belonging to the family Tineidae.

== Species ==
- Anomalotinea almaella (G. Petersen, 1957)
- Anomalotinea chellalalis (Rebel, 1901)
- Anomalotinea cubiculella (Staudinger, 1859)
- Anomalotinea gardesanella (Hartig, 1950)
- Anomalotinea fulvescentella (Lucas, 1956) (Moroccos)
- Anomalotinea wernoi Gaedike, 2009 (Moroccos)
- Anomalotinea leucella (Turati, 1926)
- Anomalotinea liguriella (Millière, 1879)
- Anomalotinea paepalella (Walsingham, 1907) (Algeria, Tunesia, Saudi Arabia)
- Anomalotinea pseudoranella (Petersen & Gaedike, 1979)
- Anomalotinea tisliticola Gaedike & Kullberg, 2015 (Moroccos)
