= Plectophila eucrines =

Scientific classification
- Domain: Eukaryota
- Kingdom: Animalia
- Phylum: Arthropoda
- Class: Insecta
- Order: Lepidoptera
- Family: Xyloryctidae
- Genus: Plectophila
- Species: P. eucrines

Binomial name
- Plectophila eucrines (Turner, 1898)

Synonyms
- Lichenaula eucrines Turner, 1898

Species of moth

Plectophila eucrines is a moth in the family Xyloryctidae. It was described by Alfred Jefferis Turner in 1898. It is found in Australia, where it has been recorded from and New South Wales and Queensland.

The wingspan is about 13 mm. The forewings are snow-white with the costal edge at the base fuscous. There is a broad ochreous-fuscous line from the base to the inner-margin at one-fifth. There is an outwardly curved ochreous-fuscous fascia from the costa at one-third to the inner-margin at two-fifths. There is a triangular ochreous-fuscous blotch on the hindmargin from the apex to the anal angle, ochreous-fuscous lines from the costa at three-fifths and four-fifths. The hindwings are grey.
