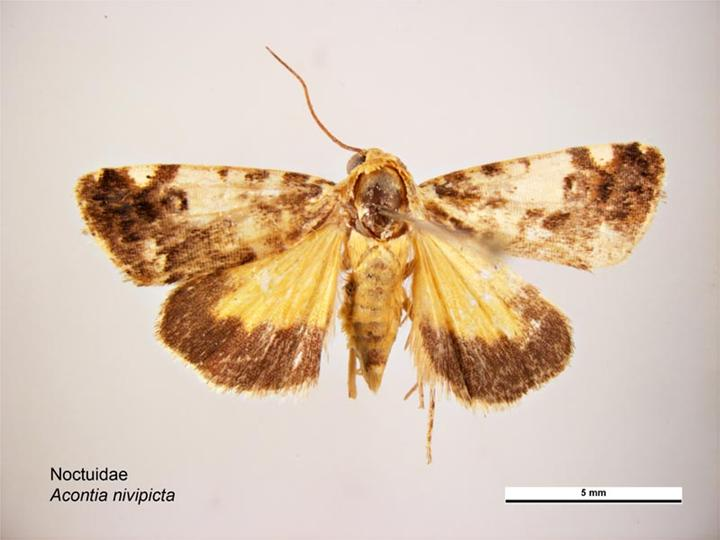
- Dorsal view
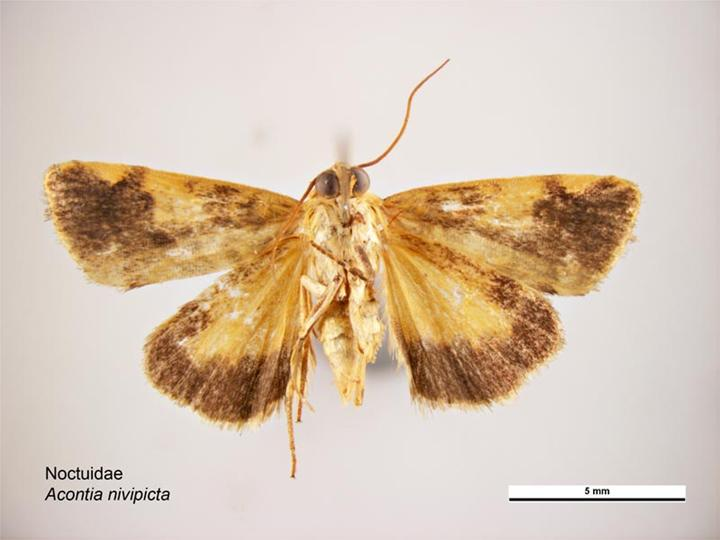
- Ventral view

Scientific classification
- Kingdom: Animalia
- Phylum: Arthropoda
- Class: Insecta
- Order: Lepidoptera
- Superfamily: Noctuoidea
- Family: Noctuidae
- Genus: Acontia
- Species: A. crocata

Binomial name
- Acontia crocata Guenée, 1852

Synonyms
- Acontia signifera Walker, 1858; Acontia meridionalis Walker, 1865; Acontia scanda R. Felder & Rogenhofer, 1874

= Acontia crocata =

Species of moth

Acontia crocata is a moth of the family Noctuidae. It is found from India to Australia. In 2003, it was recorded from Deux-Sèvres in France. The wingspan is about 20 mm. The larvae feed on Ligustrum vulgare.

== Morphology ==
Acontia moths are characterized by an elongated palpi having pointed frontal tuft, and a well developed third segment. Antennae are simple and filiform, having no complex modifications or branches. Both the thorax and abdomen are covered in smooth scales, lacking tufts or patches. The forewing is bordered with non-crenulate cilia, and plain unnotched fringe along the edges. In terms of venation, veins 7 to 10 are stalked. The larval stage is characterized by the presence of four pairs of abdominal prolegs.
