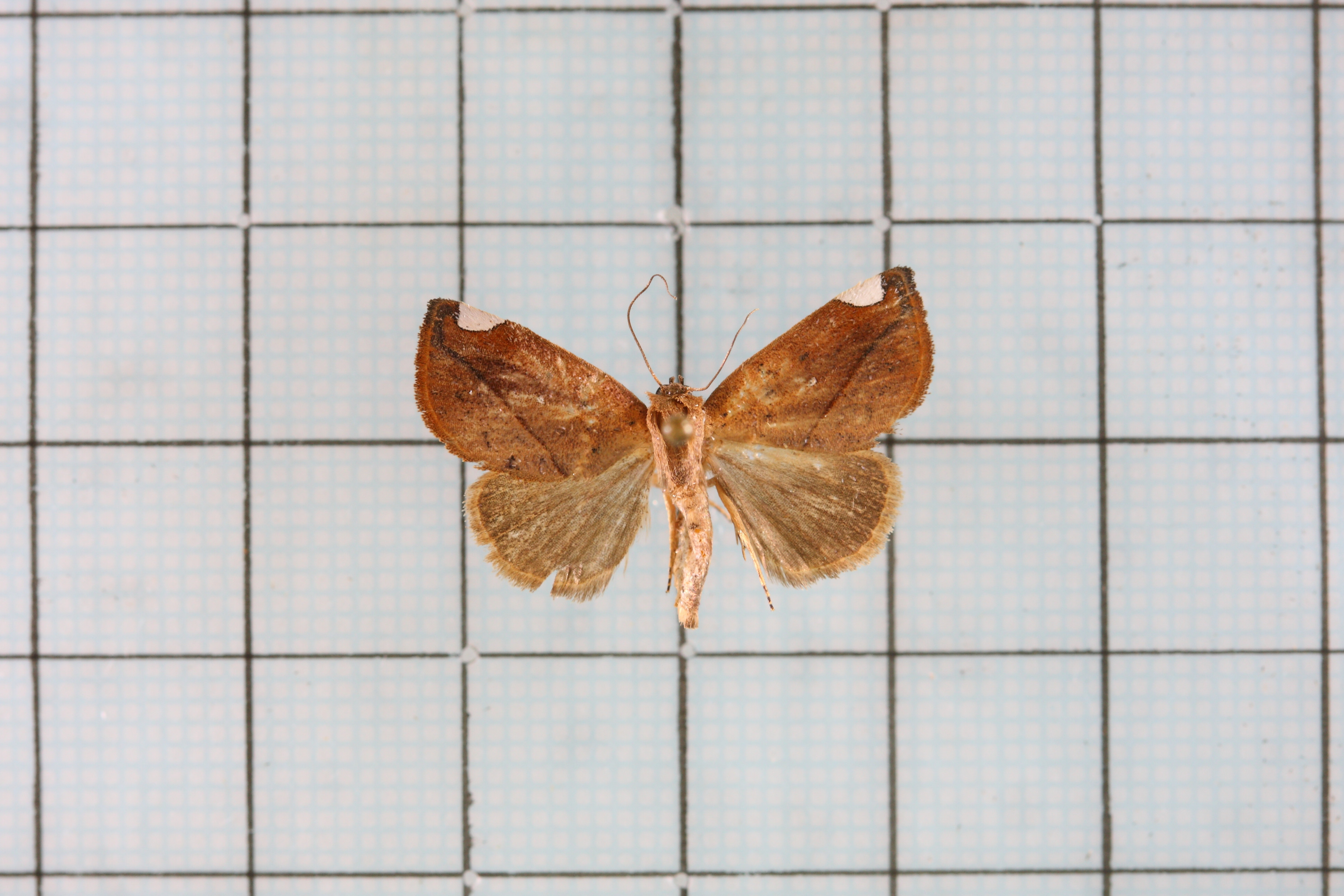

Scientific classification
- Kingdom: Animalia
- Phylum: Arthropoda
- Class: Insecta
- Order: Lepidoptera
- Superfamily: Noctuoidea
- Family: Nolidae
- Genus: Negeta
- Species: N. contrariata

Binomial name
- Negeta contrariata Walker, 1862

Synonyms
- Ariolica signata Walker, 1863; Negeta signata; Doranaga apicalis Moore, 1887; Ariolica leucospila Walker, 1865; Nertobriga reversa Walker, 1863; Nertobriga signata ab. costalis Strand, 1917; Nertobriga signata ab. discalis Strand, 1917; Nertobriga signata ab. subterminalis Strand, 1917; Nertobriga signata costalis Gaede, 1938; Nertobriga signata discalis Gaede, 1938; Nertobriga signata subterminalis Gaede, 1938

= Negeta contrariata =

Species of moth

Negeta contrariata is a moth in the family Nolidae first described by Francis Walker in 1862. It is found from the Indo-Australian tropics of India, Sri Lanka, Borneo east to Australia (Queensland) and the Bismarck Archipelago.

== Description ==
Its wingspan is about 26 mm. Female ochreous brown. Forewings with traces of sinuous antemedial line. A creamy-white triangular patch can be seen on costa before apex. An oblique rufous and ochreous line runs from apex to center of inner margin. There is an indistinct lunulate fuscous sub-marginal line. Hindwings fuscous and cilia ochreous. Ventral surface with narrow curved medial fuscous band and traces of submarginal band.
