= Clytie (moth) =

Scientific classification
- Kingdom: Animalia
- Phylum: Arthropoda
- Clade: Pancrustacea
- Class: Insecta
- Order: Lepidoptera
- Superfamily: Noctuoidea
- Family: Erebidae
- Tribe: Ophiusini
- Genus: Clytie; Hübner, [1823]

Genus of moths

Clytie is a genus of moths in the family Erebidae. The genus was erected by Jacob Hübner in 1823.

== Species ==
Subgenus Clytie Hübner, [1823]

- Clytie arenosa Rothschild, 1913
- Clytie delunaris (Staudinger, 1889)
- Clytie devia (Swinhoe, 1884)
- Clytie euryphaea Hampson, 1918
- Clytie gracilis (A. Bang-Haas, 1907)
- Clytie gyulaii Hacker, 2001
- Clytie haifa (Habich, 1905)
- Clytie illunaris (Hübner, [1813])
- Clytie micra Wiltshire, 1973
- Clytie omana Wiltshire, 1985
- Clytie rungsi Laporte, 1975
- Clytie sabaea Wiltshire, 1947
- Clytie sancta (Staudinger, 1898)
- Clytie scotorrhiza Hampson, 1913
- Clytie sublunaris (Staudinger, 1889)
- Clytie syriaca (Bugnion, 1837)
- Clytie terrulenta (Christoph, 1893)
- Clytie tropicalis Rungs, 1975

Subgenus Hypoglaucitis Staudinger, [1895]

- Clytie distincta (A. Bang-Haas, 1907)
- Clytie infrequens (Swinhoe, 1884)
