= Plectophila acrochroa =

Scientific classification
- Domain: Eukaryota
- Kingdom: Animalia
- Phylum: Arthropoda
- Class: Insecta
- Order: Lepidoptera
- Family: Xyloryctidae
- Genus: Plectophila
- Species: P. acrochroa

Binomial name
- Plectophila acrochroa (Turner, 1900)

Synonyms
- Xylorycta acrochroa Turner, 1900

Species of moth

Plectophila acrochroa is a moth in the family Xyloryctidae. It was described by Alfred Jefferis Turner in 1900. It is found in Australia, where it has been recorded from New South Wales and Queensland.

The wingspan is about 20 mm. The forewings are snow-white with a narrow ochreous streak along the costa from before the middle to three-fourths, slightly broader towards the apex, where it ends in a short, very oblique fuscous streak. There is a small triangular orange-ochreous spot on the costa just before the apex, bounded beneath by a fuscous line. The hindwings are whitish grey.
