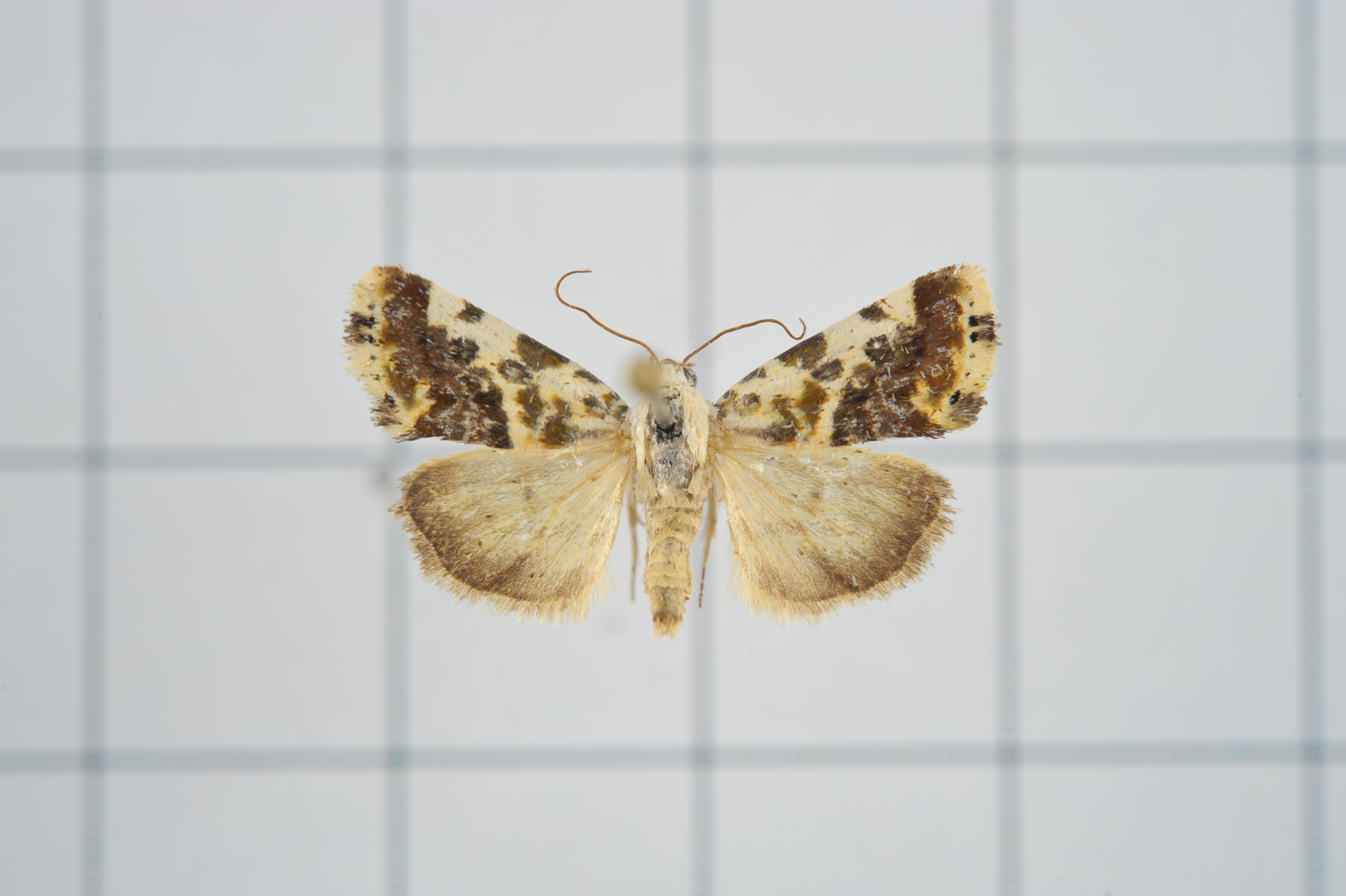

Scientific classification
- Kingdom: Animalia
- Phylum: Arthropoda
- Clade: Pancrustacea
- Class: Insecta
- Order: Lepidoptera
- Superfamily: Noctuoidea
- Family: Noctuidae
- Genus: Acontia
- Species: A. marmoralis

Binomial name
- Acontia marmoralis (Fabricius, 1794)

Synonyms
- Phalaena marmoralis Fabricius, 1794; Acontia tropica Guenée, 1852; Acontia bipunctata Walker, 1858; Acontia maculosa Walker, 1858; Tarache hemiglauca Hampson, 1910

= Acontia marmoralis =

Species of moth

Acontia marmoralis or Emmelia marmoralis is a moth of the family Noctuidae first described by Johan Christian Fabricius in 1794. It is found in South and East Asia, including Sri Lanka, India, Japan, and Taiwan.

Host plants are Sida rhombifolia, Sida alnifolia, and cotton.
