= Acontia luteola =

Scientific classification
- Kingdom: Animalia
- Phylum: Arthropoda
- Clade: Pancrustacea
- Class: Insecta
- Order: Lepidoptera
- Superfamily: Noctuoidea
- Family: Noctuidae
- Genus: Acontia
- Species: A. luteola

Binomial name
- Acontia luteola Saalmüller, 1891

Species of moth

Acontia luteola is a moth of the family Noctuidae first described by Max Saalmüller in 1891. It is known from Réunion and Madagascar.
