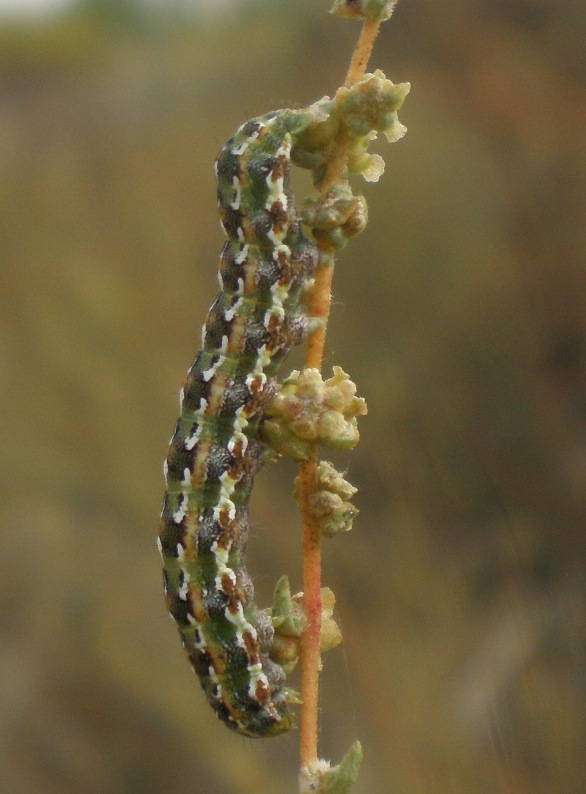
- Cardepia sociabilis

Scientific classification
- Kingdom: Animalia
- Phylum: Arthropoda
- Class: Insecta
- Order: Lepidoptera
- Superfamily: Noctuoidea
- Family: Noctuidae
- Tribe: Hadenini
- Genus: Cardepia; Hampson, 1905

= Cardepia =

Genus of moths

Cardepia is a genus of moths of the family Noctuidae.

== Species ==
- Cardepia affinis Rothschild, 1913
- Cardepia arenaria (Hampson, 1905)
- Cardepia arenbergeri Pinker, 1974
- Cardepia dardistana Boursin, 1967
- Cardepia halophila Hacker, 1998
- Cardepia hartigi Parenzan, 1981
- Cardepia helix Boursin, 1962
- Cardepia irrisoria (Erschoff, 1874)
- Cardepia kaszabi Sukhareva & Varga, 1973
- Cardepia legraini Hacker, 1998
- Cardepia martoni Hacker, 1998
- Cardepia mixta (Pagenstecher, 1907)
- Cardepia oleagina Hacker, 1998
- Cardepia sociabilis (Graslin, 1850)
