= Acontia feae =

Scientific classification
- Domain: Eukaryota
- Kingdom: Animalia
- Phylum: Arthropoda
- Class: Insecta
- Order: Lepidoptera
- Superfamily: Noctuoidea
- Family: Noctuidae
- Genus: Acontia
- Species: A. feae

Binomial name
- Acontia feae (Berio, 1937)

Synonyms
- Hoplotarache feae Berio

Species of moth

Acontia feae is a moth of the family Noctuidae. It is known from Cape Verde and is found on the island of Brava. The species was described in 1937 by Emilio Berio. It is named after Leonardo Fea, who collected the specimen described by Berio in 1898.
