= Plectophila electella =

Scientific classification
- Kingdom: Animalia
- Phylum: Arthropoda
- Class: Insecta
- Order: Lepidoptera
- Family: Xyloryctidae
- Genus: Plectophila
- Species: P. electella

Binomial name
- Plectophila electella (Walker, 1864)

Synonyms
- Oecophora electella Walker, 1864; Oecophora retractella Walker, 1864

Species of moth

Plectophila electella is a moth in the family Xyloryctidae. It was described by Francis Walker in 1864. It is found in Australia, where it has been recorded from New South Wales, Queensland and South Australia.

The wingspan is 15–16 mm. The forewings are silvery white with bright deep ochreous-brown markings, partially margined with light ochreous-yellowish scales and with a straight narrow fascia from the base of the costa to one-fourth of the inner margin. There is a streak from the upper extremity of this beneath the costa, bent up to the costa before the middle, and continued along the costa to four-fifths. A moderate irregular fascia from this streak before it reaches the costa to the inner margin at three-fifths where it runs into a thick streak, attenuated at the extremities, along the inner margin from before the middle to the anal angle. There is a moderate fascia from the costa at three-fifths towards the anal angle but not quite reaching it, connected with the preceding fascia by a slender line in the middle. A subapical spot, including a white dot on the hindmargin, is sometimes connected beneath with the lower extremity of the preceding fascia. The hindwings are grey, slightly ochreous tinged.
