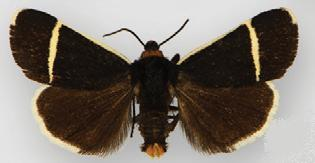

Scientific classification
- Domain: Eukaryota
- Kingdom: Animalia
- Phylum: Arthropoda
- Class: Insecta
- Order: Lepidoptera
- Superfamily: Noctuoidea
- Family: Noctuidae
- Genus: Pseudalypia
- Species: P. crotchii

Binomial name
- Pseudalypia crotchii H. Edwards, 1874

Synonyms
- Pseudalypia crotchii var. atrata H. Edwards, 1884

= Pseudalypia crotchii =

Species of moth

Pseudalypia crotchii is a moth of the family Noctuidae. It is found in California and Colorado.

The larvae feed on Malvastrum exile and Malvastrum parviflora.
