= Acontia asbenensis =

Scientific classification
- Kingdom: Animalia
- Phylum: Arthropoda
- Class: Insecta
- Order: Lepidoptera
- Superfamily: Noctuoidea
- Family: Noctuidae
- Genus: Acontia
- Species: A. asbenensis

Binomial name
- Acontia asbenensis Rothschild, 1921

Synonyms
- Trache hemipentha (Wiltshire 1947); Trache asbenensis (Rothschild 1921)

Species of moth

Acontia asbenensis is a moth of the family Noctuidae, primarily known from Niger, in the Monts Bagzane in the Aïr/ Asben region. It was first described by Rothschild in 1921.

== Description ==
The wingspan is approximately 26 mm (1.02 in).

It was previously termed Trache hemipentha and Trache asbenensis.

== Morphology ==
Acontia species are characterized by an elongated palpi having pointed frontal tuft, and a well developed third segment. Antennae are simple and filiform, having no complex modifications or branches. Both the thorax and abdomen are covered in smooth scales, lacking tufts or patches. The forewing is bordered with non-crenulate cilia, and plain unnotched fringe along the edges. In terms of venation, veins 7 to 10 are stalked. The larval stage is characterized by the presence of four pairs of abdominal prolegs.

== Distribution ==
This species is found in parts of northeastern and western Africa, with some specimens also recorded in the Arabian Peninsula. Countries include Ethiopia, Niger, Oman, Saudi Arabia, the United Arab Emirates, and Yemen. Its type locality is Egypt, from the Sinai, Bir Tawil region.
