= Acontia pauliani =

Scientific classification
- Kingdom: Animalia
- Phylum: Arthropoda
- Clade: Pancrustacea
- Class: Insecta
- Order: Lepidoptera
- Superfamily: Noctuoidea
- Family: Noctuidae
- Genus: Acontia
- Species: A. pauliani

Binomial name
- Acontia pauliani Viette, 1965

Species of moth

Acontia pauliani is a species of moth in the family Noctuidae. It was described by Pierre Viette in 1965. This species is endemic to Madagascar.
