= Acontia elaeoa =

Scientific classification
- Kingdom: Animalia
- Phylum: Arthropoda
- Class: Insecta
- Order: Lepidoptera
- Superfamily: Noctuoidea
- Family: Noctuidae
- Genus: Acontia
- Species: A. elaeoa

Binomial name
- Acontia elaeoa (Hampson, 1910)

Synonyms
- Tarache elaeoa Hampson, 1910

Species of moth

Acontia elaeoa is a moth of the family Noctuidae. It is found in Queensland.
