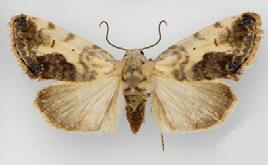

Scientific classification
- Kingdom: Animalia
- Phylum: Arthropoda
- Class: Insecta
- Order: Lepidoptera
- Superfamily: Noctuoidea
- Family: Noctuidae
- Genus: Acontia
- Species: A. albida

Binomial name
- Acontia albida (Hampson, 1910)

Synonyms
- Stylorache albida Hampson, 1910

= Acontia albida =

Species of moth

Acontia albida is a moth of the family Noctuidae. It is found in South America, including Brazil.

Adults are on wing in November and December.

== Morphology ==
Acontia species are characterized by an elongated palpi having pointed frontal tuft, and a well developed third segment. Antennae are simple and filiform, having no complex modifications or branches. Both the thorax and abdomen are covered in smooth scales, lacking tufts or patches. The forewing is bordered with non-crenulate cilia, and plain unnotched fringe along the edges. In terms of venation, veins 7 to 10 are stalked. The larval stage is characterized by the presence of four pairs of abdominal prolegs.
