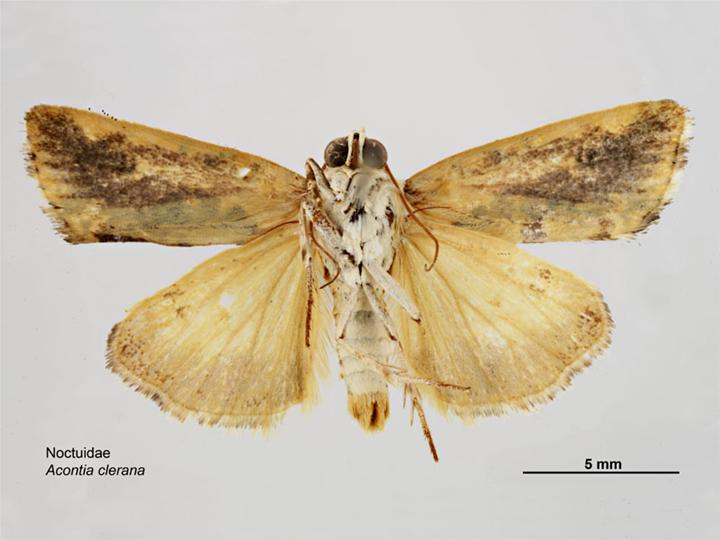
- Ventral view

Scientific classification
- Kingdom: Animalia
- Phylum: Arthropoda
- Class: Insecta
- Order: Lepidoptera
- Superfamily: Noctuoidea
- Family: Noctuidae
- Genus: Acontia
- Species: A. clerana

Binomial name
- Acontia clerana (Lower, 1902)

Synonyms
- Tarache clerana Lower, 1902; Tarache hieroglyphica Lower, 1902; Acontia hieroglyphica (Lower, 1902)

= Acontia clerana =

Species of moth

Acontia clerana is a moth of the family Noctuidae. It is found in Western Australia, New South Wales and Queensland.

== Morphology ==
Acontia species are characterized by an elongated palpi having pointed frontal tuft, and a well developed third segment. Antennae are simple and filiform, having no complex modifications or branches. Both the thorax and abdomen are covered in smooth scales, lacking tufts or patches. The forewing is bordered with non-crenulate cilia, and plain unnotched fringe along the edges. In terms of venation, veins 7 to 10 are stalked. The larval stage is characterized by the presence of four pairs of abdominal prolegs.
