= Acontia hemixanthia =

Scientific classification
- Kingdom: Animalia
- Phylum: Arthropoda
- Clade: Pancrustacea
- Class: Insecta
- Order: Lepidoptera
- Superfamily: Noctuoidea
- Family: Noctuidae
- Genus: Acontia
- Species: A. hemixanthia

Binomial name
- Acontia hemixanthia Hampson, 1910

Species of moth

Acontia hemixanthia is a species of moth in the family Noctuidae. It was described by Sir George Francis Hampson, 10th Baronet in 1910. This species can be found throughout much of the Afrotropical realm.
