= Clytie terrulenta =

Scientific classification
- Kingdom: Animalia
- Phylum: Arthropoda
- Class: Insecta
- Order: Lepidoptera
- Superfamily: Noctuoidea
- Family: Erebidae
- Genus: Clytie
- Species: C. terrulenta

Binomial name
- Clytie terrulenta (Christoph, 1893)

Synonyms
- Clytie terrulenta gentilis

Species of moth

Clytie terrulenta is a moth of the family Erebidae first described by Hugo Theodor Christoph in 1893. It is found in the Near East and Middle East.

There are multiple generations per year. Adults are on wing from March to May.

The larvae probably feed on Tamarix species.
