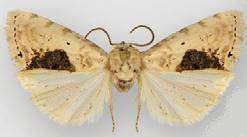

Scientific classification
- Kingdom: Animalia
- Phylum: Arthropoda
- Class: Insecta
- Order: Lepidoptera
- Superfamily: Noctuoidea
- Family: Noctuidae
- Genus: Acontia
- Species: A. nubifera

Binomial name
- Acontia nubifera (Hampson, 1910)

Synonyms
- Chelichares nubifera Hampson, 1910

= Acontia nubifera =

Species of moth

Acontia nubifera is a moth of the family Noctuidae. It is found in South America, including Argentina.
