= Acontia detrita =

Scientific classification
- Kingdom: Animalia
- Phylum: Arthropoda
- Class: Insecta
- Order: Lepidoptera
- Superfamily: Noctuoidea
- Family: Noctuidae
- Genus: Acontia
- Species: A. detrita

Binomial name
- Acontia detrita Butler, 1886

Synonyms
- Acontia clarissa Butler, 1886

Species of moth

Acontia detrita is a moth of the family Noctuidae. It is found in New South Wales and Queensland.

The wingspan is about 15 mm.
