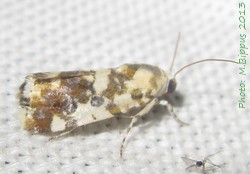
- Acontia transfigurata stumpffi

Scientific classification
- Kingdom: Animalia
- Phylum: Arthropoda
- Clade: Pancrustacea
- Class: Insecta
- Order: Lepidoptera
- Superfamily: Noctuoidea
- Family: Noctuidae
- Genus: Acontia
- Species: A. transfigurata

Binomial name
- Acontia transfigurata Wallengren, 1856

= Acontia transfigurata =

Species of moth

Acontia transfigurata is a moth of the family Noctuidae. It is found in most countries of subtropical Africa south of the Sahara.

== Subspecies ==
- Acontia transfigurata transfigurata Wallengren, 1856
- Acontia transfigurata stumpffi Saalmüller, 1891 (Madagascar)
