= Plectophila pyrgodes =

Scientific classification
- Domain: Eukaryota
- Kingdom: Animalia
- Phylum: Arthropoda
- Class: Insecta
- Order: Lepidoptera
- Family: Xyloryctidae
- Genus: Plectophila
- Species: P. pyrgodes

Binomial name
- Plectophila pyrgodes Turner, 1898

Synonyms
- Plectophila ascripta Lucas, 1901

Species of moth

Plectophila pyrgodes is a moth in the family Xyloryctidae. It was described by Alfred Jefferis Turner in 1898. It is found in Australia, where it has been recorded from New South Wales and Queensland.

The wingspan is about 15 mm for males and 18 mm for females. The forewings are white with ochreous-fuscous markings, and the costal edge fuscous at the extreme base. There is a broad streak along the inner margin from one-fourth to the anal angle. From this arises a broad transverse bar crossing the disc at one-third, ceasing abruptly at one-third breadth of the wing from the costa. There is a very broad fascia from the costa beyond the middle to the anal angle, both margins irregularly dentate. A dark-fuscous longitudinal streak is found at the apex, attenuated anteriorly. Between this and the costa is an ochreous-brown area with two white dots on the costa. The hindmarginal part of the disc is irrorated with fuscous. The hindwings are dark-grey.
