= Clytie delunaris =

Scientific classification
- Kingdom: Animalia
- Phylum: Arthropoda
- Class: Insecta
- Order: Lepidoptera
- Superfamily: Noctuoidea
- Family: Erebidae
- Genus: Clytie
- Species: C. delunaris

Binomial name
- Clytie delunaris (Staudinger, 1889)

Synonyms
- Clytie luteonigra; Clytie delunaria; Pseudophia sublunaris var. delunaris

Species of moth

Clytie delunaris is a moth of the family Erebidae first described by Otto Staudinger in 1889. It is found in Central Asia, Mongolia, Afghanistan, Iran and Israel.

There is one generation per year. Adults are on wing from May to July.

The larvae probably feed on Tamarix species.
