= Clytie haifae =

Scientific classification
- Kingdom: Animalia
- Phylum: Arthropoda
- Class: Insecta
- Order: Lepidoptera
- Superfamily: Noctuoidea
- Family: Erebidae
- Genus: Clytie
- Species: C. haifae

Binomial name
- Clytie haifae (Habich, 1905)

Synonyms
- Clytie haifa

Species of moth

Clytie haifae is a moth of the family Erebidae first described by O. Habich in 1905. It is found along the coast of Algeria, Morocco, Sudan, Egypt, Lebanon and Israel.

This species goes through multiple generations per year. Adults are on wing from March to May and September.

The larvae feed on Tamarix species.
