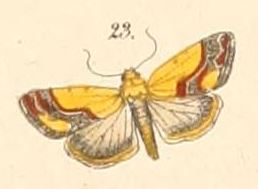

Scientific classification
- Domain: Eukaryota
- Kingdom: Animalia
- Phylum: Arthropoda
- Class: Insecta
- Order: Lepidoptera
- Superfamily: Noctuoidea
- Family: Noctuidae
- Genus: Acontia
- Species: A. sexpunctata

Binomial name
- Acontia sexpunctata (Fabricius, 1794)

Synonyms
- Pyralis sexpunctata Fabricius, 1794; Erastria imbuta Walker, 1865; Acontia acerba Felder & Rogenhofer, 1874; Acontia jnda [sic] Felder & Rogenhofer, 1874; Tarache sexpunctata ochreola Warren, 1913

= Acontia sexpunctata =

Species of moth

Acontia sexpunctata is a moth of the family Noctuidae first described by Johan Christian Fabricius in 1794. It is found in Sri Lanka and India.

Its host plant is Sida rhombifolia.
