= Acontia thapsina =

Scientific classification
- Kingdom: Animalia
- Phylum: Arthropoda
- Class: Insecta
- Order: Lepidoptera
- Superfamily: Noctuoidea
- Family: Noctuidae
- Genus: Acontia
- Species: A. thapsina

Binomial name
- Acontia thapsina (Turner, 1902)

Synonyms
- Hyela thapsina Turner, 1902; Tarache xuthota Hampson, 1910

Species of moth

Acontia thapsina is a moth of the family Noctuidae. It is found in Queensland.
