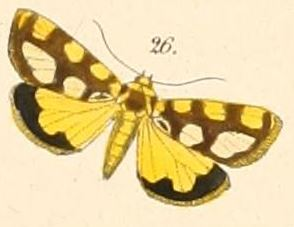

Scientific classification
- Domain: Eukaryota
- Kingdom: Animalia
- Phylum: Arthropoda
- Class: Insecta
- Order: Lepidoptera
- Superfamily: Noctuoidea
- Family: Noctuidae
- Genus: Acontia
- Species: A. guttifera

Binomial name
- Acontia guttifera Felder & Rogenhofer, 1874

Synonyms
- Tarache guttifera

= Acontia guttifera =

Species of moth

Acontia guttifera is a moth of the family Erebidae. It is found in Africa, where it is known from Angola, Kenya, Malawi, Mozambique, Namibia, South Africa, Tanzania and Zimbabwe.
