= Plectophila sarculata =

Scientific classification
- Domain: Eukaryota
- Kingdom: Animalia
- Phylum: Arthropoda
- Class: Insecta
- Order: Lepidoptera
- Family: Xyloryctidae
- Genus: Plectophila
- Species: P. sarculata

Binomial name
- Plectophila sarculata T. P. Lucas, 1901

Species of moth

Plectophila sarculata is a moth in the family Xyloryctidae. It was described by Thomas Pennington Lucas in 1901. It is found in Australia, where it has been recorded from Queensland.

The wingspan is 14–18 mm. The forewings are white with fuscous markings which are diffused with ochreous, and irrorated (sprinkled) with black scales. There is a broad fascia from the fold opposite two-fifths the inner margin, the anterior border in two waves to one-third of the costa, and continued as a fine line toward the base, but not as far as the base, the posterior border is irregularly curved and toothed, nearly parallel to the anterior border, then curved along the costa, and gradually narrowing to a thinned out line at four-fifths of the costa. This subtends a second fascia which is sometimes commingled with it from a point opposite two-thirds of the costa and which gradually widens to the inner margin, the anterior border twice waved and finely denticulate to beyond half the inner margin, the posterior border with a sinuate outward curve to anal angle of the inner margin. From its centre a bar connects with a broad diffused apical fascia. The hindwings are light fuscous.
