= Plectophila placocosma =

Scientific classification
- Domain: Eukaryota
- Kingdom: Animalia
- Phylum: Arthropoda
- Class: Insecta
- Order: Lepidoptera
- Family: Xyloryctidae
- Genus: Plectophila
- Species: P. placocosma

Binomial name
- Plectophila placocosma Lower, 1893

Species of moth

Plectophila placocosma is a moth in the family Xyloryctidae. It was described by Oswald Bertram Lower in 1893. It is found in Australia, where it has been recorded from New South Wales.

The wingspan is about 14 mm. The forewings are white, slightly ochreous tinged and with a broad dark fuscous fascia suffused on the lower half, the anterior edge curved from one-sixth of the costa to one-sixth of the inner margin. There is a large irregular fuscous patch on the costa beyond the middle, reaching more than half across the wing, the anterior edge preceded by a blackish discal spot. There is a large fuscous patch on the hind margin from the apex to the anal angle and a fuscous hindmarginal line, separated from the preceding patch by a streak of the ground colour. The hindwings are yellowish, with a broad fuscous suffusion occupying the posterior two-thirds of the wing.
