= Plectophila thiophanes =

Scientific classification
- Domain: Eukaryota
- Kingdom: Animalia
- Phylum: Arthropoda
- Class: Insecta
- Order: Lepidoptera
- Family: Xyloryctidae
- Genus: Plectophila
- Species: P. thiophanes

Binomial name
- Plectophila thiophanes (Turner, 1917)

Synonyms
- Xylorycta thiophanes Turner, 1917

Species of moth

Plectophila thiophanes is a moth in the family Xyloryctidae. It was described by Alfred Jefferis Turner in 1917. It is found in Australia, where it has been recorded from Queensland.

The wingspan is about 25 mm. The forewings are whitish-ochreous with dark fuscous markings. There is a large sub-basal spot on the dorsum and a transverse line at one-third slightly curved and outwardly oblique, not extending to the margins. A very oblique broad line is found from two-thirds of the costa to the termen beneath the apex and there is a spot on the costa beyond this, as well as a broad terminal line. The hindwings are whitish-ochreous with the central part of the disc and terminal area suffused with fuscous.
