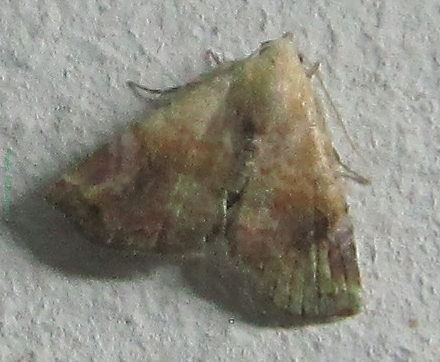

Scientific classification
- Domain: Eukaryota
- Kingdom: Animalia
- Phylum: Arthropoda
- Class: Insecta
- Order: Lepidoptera
- Superfamily: Noctuoidea
- Family: Noctuidae
- Genus: Eublemmoides (Bethune-Baker, 1906)

= Eublemmoides =

Genus of moths

Eublemmoides is a genus of moths of the family Noctuidae erected by George Thomas Bethune-Baker in 1906.

== Species ==
Species in this genus are:

- Eublemmoides apicimacula (Mabille, 1880)
- Eublemmoides acrapex Hampson 1896
- Eublemmoides crassiuscula Walker 1864
- Eublemmoides dinawa Bethune-Baker 1906
- Eublemmoides ochracea Warren 1913
- Eublemmoides pectorora (Lucas 1894)
- Eublemmoides rufiplaga Hampson 1910
- Eublemmoides semirufus Hampson 1902
- Eublemmoides subangulatus Hampson 1902
