= Plectophila micradelpha =

Scientific classification
- Domain: Eukaryota
- Kingdom: Animalia
- Phylum: Arthropoda
- Class: Insecta
- Order: Lepidoptera
- Family: Xyloryctidae
- Genus: Plectophila
- Species: P. micradelpha

Binomial name
- Plectophila micradelpha (Turner, 1898)

Synonyms
- Lichenaula micradelpha Turner, 1898

Species of moth

Plectophila micradelpha is a moth in the family Xyloryctidae. It was described by Alfred Jefferis Turner in 1898. It is found in Australia, where it has been recorded from Queensland.

The wingspan is 14–16 mm. The forewings are white, with the inner and hindmarginal portions of the disc more or less suffused with greyish and with the costal edge fuscous towards the base. There is a narrow fuscous line along the fold and a longitudinal fuscous line in the central third of the disc, as well as an outwardly oblique greyish line from the costa at two-thirds towards the hindmargin, sharply bent in the disc and continued to the anal angle, posteriorly this line is margined with white, anteriorly it is more or less lost in the greyish suffusion. There is also a short fuscous longitudinal streak from the apex and a greyish suffusion along the hindmargin. The hindwings are pale grey.
