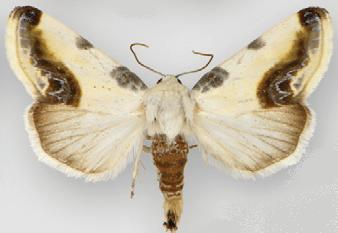

Scientific classification
- Kingdom: Animalia
- Phylum: Arthropoda
- Class: Insecta
- Order: Lepidoptera
- Superfamily: Noctuoidea
- Family: Noctuidae
- Genus: Acontia
- Species: A. cretata

Binomial name
- Acontia cretata (Grote & Robinson, 1870)

Synonyms
- Tarache cretata Grote & Robinson, 1870; Acontia neocula Smith, 1900; Acontia schwarzii Smith, 1900; Tarache schvarzi Hampson, 1910

= Acontia cretata =

Chalky bird dropping moth

Species of moth

Acontia cretata, the chalky bird dropping moth, is a moth of the family Noctuidae. The species was first described by Augustus Radcliffe Grote and Coleman Townsend Robinson in 1870. It is found from the US states of California to Texas and Oklahoma, north to Colorado and Utah.

The wingspan is 22–27 mm. Adults are on wing from April to September.

The larva has been recorded as a host of the parasitoid braconid wasp Bracon mellitor.

== Morphology ==
Acontia species are characterized by an elongated palpi having pointed frontal tuft, and a well developed third segment. Antennae are simple and filiform, having no complex modifications or branches. Both the thorax and abdomen are covered in smooth scales, lacking tufts or patches. The forewing is bordered with non-crenulate cilia, and plain unnotched fringe along the edges. In terms of venation, veins 7 to 10 are stalked. The larval stage is characterized by the presence of four pairs of abdominal prolegs.
