= Clytie arenosa =

Scientific classification
- Kingdom: Animalia
- Phylum: Arthropoda
- Class: Insecta
- Order: Lepidoptera
- Superfamily: Noctuoidea
- Family: Erebidae
- Genus: Clytie
- Species: C. arenosa

Binomial name
- Clytie arenosa Rothschild, 1913

Synonyms
- Clytie seifersi

Species of moth

Clytie arenosa is a moth of the family Erebidae first described by Walter Rothschild in 1913. The nominate form is found in the deserts of North Africa. Subspecies Clytie arenosa nabataea is found in Israel (in oases in the Jordan Rift Valley)

There is one generation per year. Adults are on wing from April to June.

The larvae probably feed on Tamarix species.

== Subspecies ==
- Clytie arenosa arenosa
- Clytie arenosa nabataea
