= Acontia gloriosa =

Scientific classification
- Domain: Eukaryota
- Kingdom: Animalia
- Phylum: Arthropoda
- Class: Insecta
- Order: Lepidoptera
- Superfamily: Noctuoidea
- Family: Noctuidae
- Genus: Acontia
- Species: A. gloriosa

Binomial name
- Acontia gloriosa (Kenrick, 1917)

Synonyms
- Hypercalymnia gloriosa Kenrick, 1917

Species of moth

Acontia gloriosa is a moth of the family Noctuidae. It was first described by George Hamilton Kenrick in 1917 and is found in Madagascar.

The forewings of this species are coppery, shot with purple, the hindwings pale ochreous. The wingspan of this moth is 40 mm.
