= Enterpia =

Scientific classification
- Kingdom: Animalia
- Phylum: Arthropoda
- Clade: Pancrustacea
- Class: Insecta
- Order: Lepidoptera
- Superfamily: Noctuoidea
- Family: Noctuidae
- Tribe: Hadenini
- Genus: Enterpia; Guenée, 1850

Genus of moths

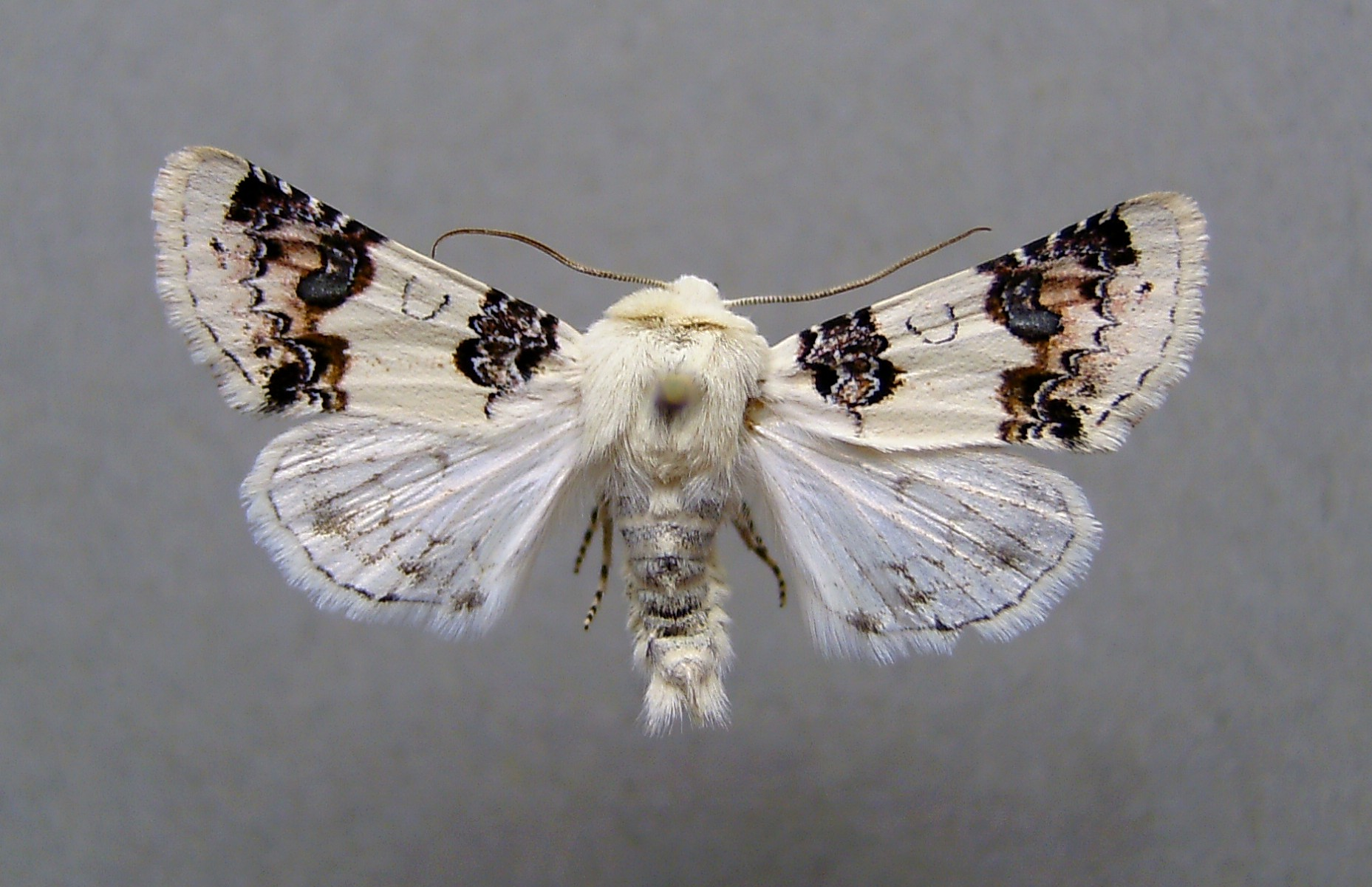
Enterpia laudeti

Enterpia is a genus of moths of the family Noctuidae.

== Species ==
- Enterpia alpherakyi Hacker, 1996
- Enterpia laudeti (Boisduval, 1840)
- Enterpia picturata (Alphéraky, 1882)
- Enterpia roseocandida Hacker, 1996
