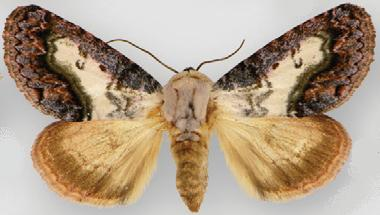

Scientific classification
- Domain: Eukaryota
- Kingdom: Animalia
- Phylum: Arthropoda
- Class: Insecta
- Order: Lepidoptera
- Superfamily: Noctuoidea
- Family: Noctuidae
- Genus: Acontia
- Species: A. ruffinellii

Binomial name
- Acontia ruffinellii (Biezanko, 1959)

Synonyms
- Hoplotarache ruffinellii Biezanko, 1959

= Acontia ruffinellii =

Species of moth

Acontia ruffinellii is a moth of the family Noctuidae. It is found in the Rio Grande do Sul region of Brazil and Uruguay.
