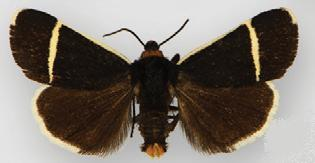
- Pseudalypia crotchii

Scientific classification
- Domain: Eukaryota
- Kingdom: Animalia
- Phylum: Arthropoda
- Class: Insecta
- Order: Lepidoptera
- Superfamily: Noctuoidea
- Family: Noctuidae
- Tribe: Acontiini
- Genus: Pseudalypia; H. Edwards, 1874

= Pseudalypia =

Genus of moths

Pseudalypia is a genus of moths of the family Noctuidae erected by Henry Edwards in 1874. Some authors include it in Acontia, but it is tentatively treated as different here pending further research.

== Species ==
- Pseudalypia crotchii H. Edwards, 1874
- Pseudalypia stuartii Schaus, 1889
