= Plectophila thrasycosma =

Scientific classification
- Kingdom: Animalia
- Phylum: Arthropoda
- Class: Insecta
- Order: Lepidoptera
- Family: Xyloryctidae
- Genus: Plectophila
- Species: P. thrasycosma

Binomial name
- Plectophila thrasycosma (Meyrick, 1915)

Synonyms
- Xylorycta thrasycosma Meyrick, 1915; Plectophila thrasycosma Tillyard, 1926

Species of moth

Plectophila thrasycosma is a moth in the family Xyloryctidae. It was described by Edward Meyrick in 1915. It is found in Australia, where it has been recorded from Queensland.

The wingspan is 18–24 mm. The forewings are shining white with ochreous-brown markings. The costal edge is ochreous brown anteriorly and there is a fascia from the base of the costa along the dorsum to one-third, as well as a thick streak rising from this near the costa and running to the costa at one-third, then along the costa to three-fourths, extremity pointed. There is an oblique fascia rising from this at one-fourth, the posterior edge obtusely angulated, expanded on the dorsum so as to extend nearly from the middle to the tornus. There is also an irregular fascia running from the costal streak beyond the middle almost or quite to touch this at the tornus, then abruptly angulated upwards and running near the termen to the apex, with a more or less distinct prominence touching the termen in the middle. The hindwings are light grey tinged with whitish ochreous.

The larvae feed on Eucalyptus crebra. They feed from within a spiral tunnel of silk and frass in the leaves.
