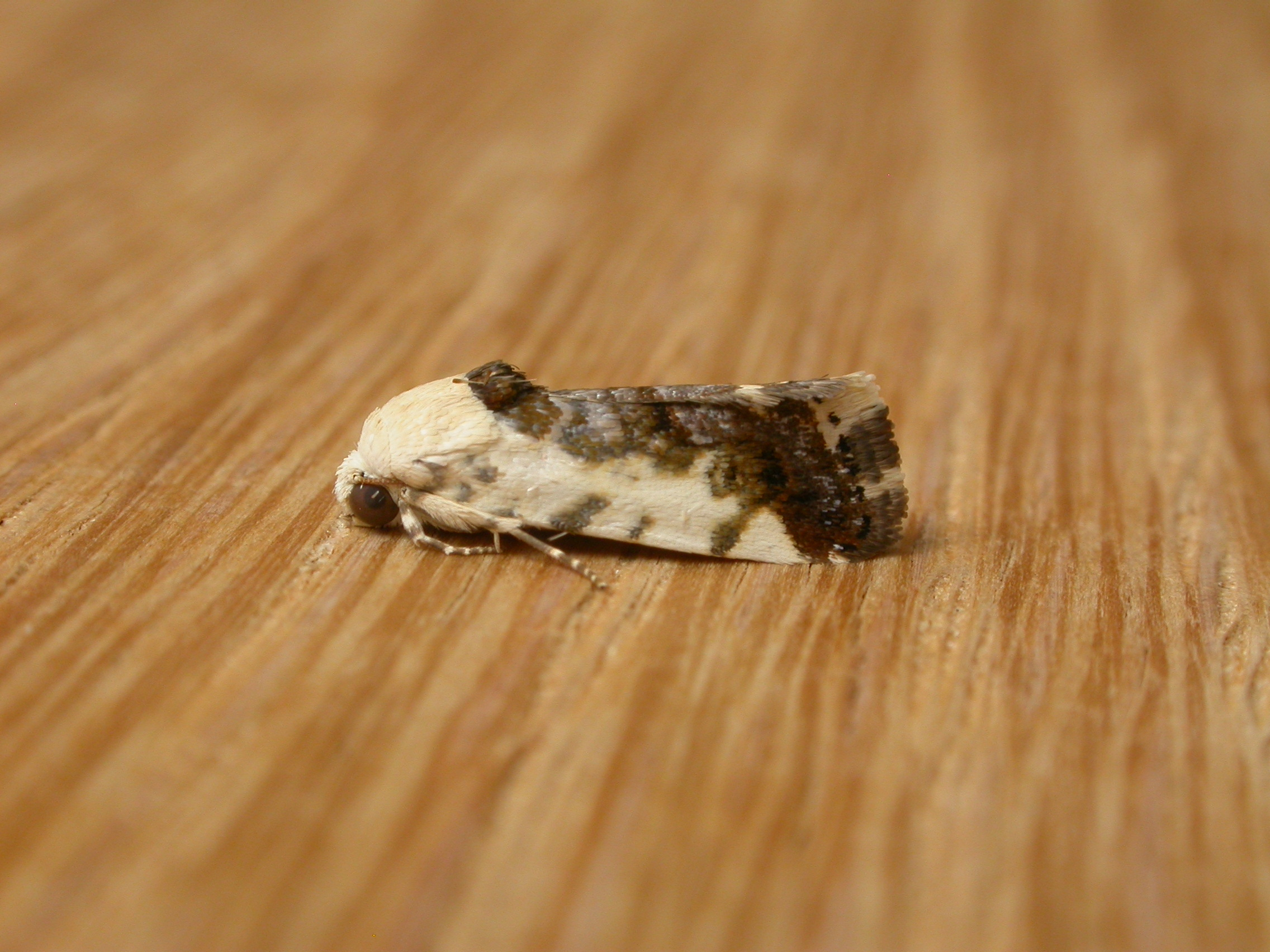

Scientific classification
- Domain: Eukaryota
- Kingdom: Animalia
- Phylum: Arthropoda
- Class: Insecta
- Order: Lepidoptera
- Superfamily: Noctuoidea
- Family: Noctuidae
- Genus: Acontia
- Species: A. nivipicta

Binomial name
- Acontia nivipicta Butler, 1886

Synonyms
- Tarache nivipictoides

= Acontia nivipicta =

Species of moth

Acontia nivipicta is a moth of the family Noctuidae. It is found in the northern two thirds of Australia.

The wingspan is about 20 mm.
