= Acontia gratiosa =

Scientific classification
- Kingdom: Animalia
- Phylum: Arthropoda
- Class: Insecta
- Order: Lepidoptera
- Superfamily: Noctuoidea
- Family: Noctuidae
- Genus: Acontia
- Species: A. gratiosa

Binomial name
- Acontia gratiosa Wallengren, 1856

Synonyms
- Cardiosace olivescens Hampson, 1910; Acontia olivescens (Hampson, 1910); Acontia zelleri Wallengren, 1856

Species of moth

Acontia gratiosa is a moth of the family Noctuidae first described by Hans Daniel Johan Wallengren in 1856.

== Distribution ==
It is found in continental Africa and Farquhar Atoll in the Seychelles.
