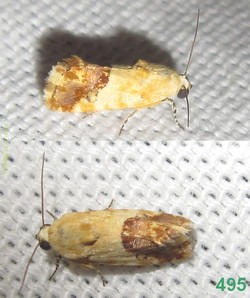

Scientific classification
- Kingdom: Animalia
- Phylum: Arthropoda
- Class: Insecta
- Order: Lepidoptera
- Superfamily: Noctuoidea
- Family: Noctuidae
- Genus: Acontia
- Species: A. imitatrix

Binomial name
- Acontia imitatrix Wallengren, 1856

= Acontia imitatrix =

Species of moth

Acontia imitatrix is a moth of the family Noctuidae. It is found in most countries in Africa, from Morocco to Nigeria, Ghana to South Africa, Angola to Somalia, Yemen and Saudi Arabia.
