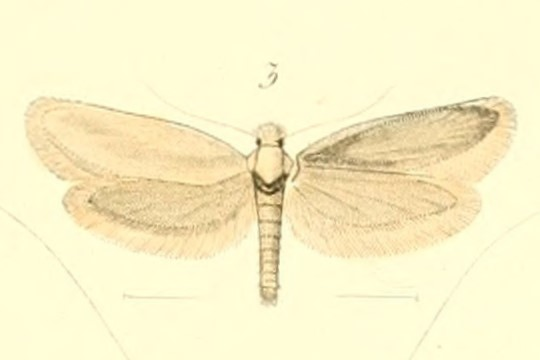

Scientific classification
- Kingdom: Animalia
- Phylum: Arthropoda
- Class: Insecta
- Order: Lepidoptera
- Family: Tineidae
- Genus: Anomalotinea
- Species: A. cubiculella

Binomial name
- Anomalotinea cubiculella (Staudinger, 1859)

Synonyms
- Tinea cubiculella Staudinger, 1859; Eriocottis recticostella Caradja, 1920; Myrmecozela danubiella var. algiricella Rebel, 1901; Myrmecozela eremica Amsel, 1935; Tinea minutella Meess, 1910; Fermocelina occidentalis Zagulajev, 1972; Myrmecozela romeii Turati, 1929

= Anomalotinea cubiculella =

Species of moth

Anomalotinea cubiculella is a moth in the family Tineidae. It was described by Staudinger in 1859. It is found in Spain, Palestine, Algeria, Libya and Mauritania.

The wingspan is 15–17 mm.

== Subspecies ==
- Anomalotinea cubiculella cubiculella (Spain)
- Anomalotinea cubiculella algiricella (Rebel, 1901) (Algeria)
- Anomalotinea cubiculella eremica (Amsel, 1935) (Palestine)
