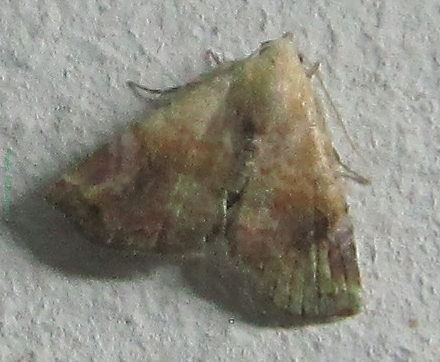

Scientific classification
- Domain: Eukaryota
- Kingdom: Animalia
- Phylum: Arthropoda
- Class: Insecta
- Order: Lepidoptera
- Superfamily: Noctuoidea
- Family: Noctuidae
- Genus: Eublemmoides
- Species: E. apicimacula

Binomial name
- Eublemmoides apicimacula (Mabille, 1880)

Synonyms
- Erastria apicimacula - Mabille 1880; Eublemma truncata -Hampson, 1905

= Eublemmoides apicimacula =

Chocolate tip eublemma

Species of moth

Eublemmoides apicimacula, also known as the chocolate tip eublemma, is a moth of the family Noctuidae. It is found in Africa south of the Sahara, Senegal, Mauritania, São Tomé and Principe, Kenia, South Africa, the Indian Ocean islands and in Yemen.
