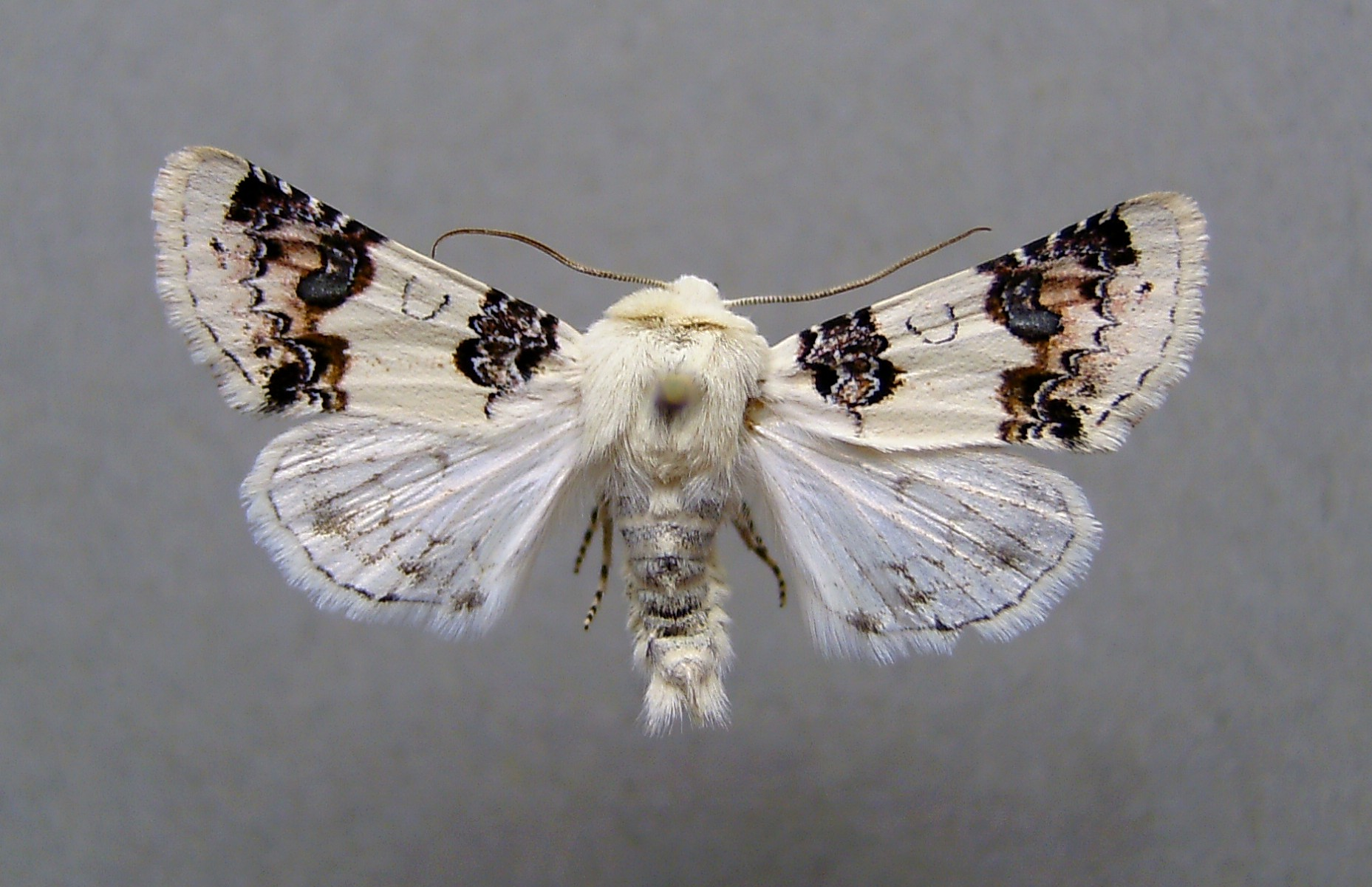

Scientific classification
- Domain: Eukaryota
- Kingdom: Animalia
- Phylum: Arthropoda
- Class: Insecta
- Order: Lepidoptera
- Superfamily: Noctuoidea
- Family: Noctuidae
- Genus: Enterpia
- Species: E. laudeti

Binomial name
- Enterpia laudeti (Boisduval, 1840)

Synonyms
- Cleophana laudeti Boisduval, 1840; Acontia cretacea Eversmann, 1847; Enterpia loudeti Spuler, 1907; Hadena laudeti

= Enterpia laudeti =

Species of moth

Enterpia laudeti is a species of moth of the family Noctuidae. It is found in southern Europe, Ukraine, European part of south-eastern Russia, Kazakhstan, Turkmenistan, Iran, Iraq, Israel, Lebanon, Syria, Jordan, the Sinai in Egypt and the Arabian Peninsula.

Adults are on wing from March to May. There is one generation per year.

The larvae feed on Silene and Gypsophila species.

== Subspecies ==
- Enterpia laudeti laudeti
- Enterpia laudeti orientis
- Enterpia laudeti roseomarginata (Palestine,…)
