= Cardepia affinis =

Scientific classification
- Domain: Eukaryota
- Kingdom: Animalia
- Phylum: Arthropoda
- Class: Insecta
- Order: Lepidoptera
- Superfamily: Noctuoidea
- Family: Noctuidae
- Genus: Cardepia
- Species: C. affinis

Binomial name
- Cardepia affinis Rothschild, 1913

Synonyms
- Scotogramma ghigii Turati, 1921; Discestra strobilacei Dumont, 1925; Scotogramma compacta Turati, 1934

Species of moth

Cardepia affinis is a species of moth of the family Noctuidae. It is found in south-western Europe, North Africa, Israel, Lebanon, Syria, Jordan and the Sinai in Egypt, the Arabian Peninsula and southern Iran.

Adults are on wing from November to January and from March to May. There are two generations per year.

The larvae feed on various halophilous plants, including Atriplex species.

== Subspecies ==
- Cardepia affinis affinis
- Cardepia affinis antinea (Morocco to the Canary Islands)
- Cardepia affinis europaea
- Cardepia affinis iatnana
