= Clytie sancta =

Scientific classification
- Kingdom: Animalia
- Phylum: Arthropoda
- Class: Insecta
- Order: Lepidoptera
- Superfamily: Noctuoidea
- Family: Erebidae
- Genus: Clytie
- Species: C. sancta

Binomial name
- Clytie sancta (Staudinger, 1898)

Species of moth

Clytie sancta is a moth of the family Erebidae first described by Otto Staudinger in 1898. It is found in the deserts of North Africa, from the central parts of the Sahara to the Arabian Peninsula.

There are multiple generations per year. Adults are on wing year round.

The larvae feed on Tamarix species.
