= Acontia biskrensis =

Scientific classification
- Domain: Eukaryota
- Kingdom: Animalia
- Phylum: Arthropoda
- Class: Insecta
- Order: Lepidoptera
- Superfamily: Noctuoidea
- Family: Noctuidae
- Genus: Acontia
- Species: A. biskrensis

Binomial name
- Acontia biskrensis Oberthür, 1887

Moth species

Acontia biskrensis is a moth of the family Noctuidae, primarily known from Biskra, Algeria. It was first described by Charles Oberthür in 1887.

== Description ==
The wingspan is approximately 22–26mm (0.86–1.02 in).

In previous studies, it has been termed Tarache biskrensis. It has also remained synonymous with Tarache grisescens (Rebel, 1947), Tarache biskrensis subsp. orientalis (Brandt, 1893), and Tarache biskrensis subsp. agacinoi (Rungs, 1945), and Tarache agacinoi (Rungs, 1945).

Larvae have been recorded feeding on Malvaceae plants.

== Morphology ==
Acontia species are characterized by an elongated palpi having pointed frontal tuft, and a well developed third segment. Antennae are simple and filiform, having no complex modifications or branches. Both the thorax and abdomen are covered in smooth scales, lacking tufts or patches. The forewing is bordered with non-crenulate cilia, and plain unnotched fringe along the edges. In terms of venation, veins 7 to 10 are stalked. The larval stage is characterized by the presence of four pairs of abdominal prolegs.

== Distribution ==
The species is found in parts of North Africa (Algeria, Egypt, Libya, Mauritania, Morocco, and Tunisia), the Arabian Peninsula (Saudi Arabia, Kuwait, and the United Arab Emirates), Middle East ( Iran, Iraq, Israel, Jordan, and Palestine) and Spain. In Egypt, it is distributed across Lower Egypt, Coastal Stripe, Gebel Elba and Sinai.
