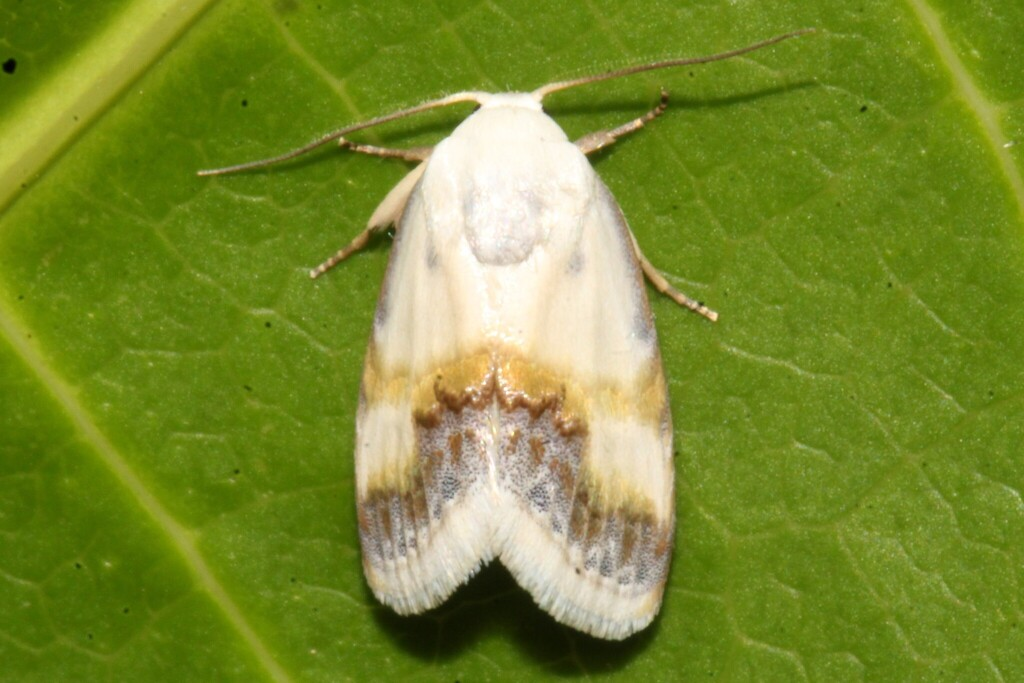
- Negeta luminosa

Scientific classification
- Kingdom: Animalia
- Phylum: Arthropoda
- Clade: Pancrustacea
- Class: Insecta
- Order: Lepidoptera
- Superfamily: Noctuoidea
- Family: Nolidae
- Genus: Negeta
- Species: N. luminosa

Binomial name
- Negeta luminosa Walker, 1858

Synonyms
- Negeta lacteola Mabille, 1880; Negeta parectata Wallengren, 1863; Negeta tenax Saalmüller, 1884

= Negeta luminosa =

Species of moth

Negeta luminosa is a species of moth in the family Nolidae. It is found in most of Sub-Saharan Africa.
