= Clytie infrequens =

Scientific classification
- Kingdom: Animalia
- Phylum: Arthropoda
- Class: Insecta
- Order: Lepidoptera
- Superfamily: Noctuoidea
- Family: Erebidae
- Genus: Clytie
- Species: C. infrequens

Binomial name
- Clytie infrequens (C. Swinhoe, 1884)

Synonyms
- Clytie benenotata; Clytie infrequens moses

Species of moth

Clytie infrequens is a moth of the family Erebidae first described by Charles Swinhoe in 1884. It is found in eremic (desert) areas from the eastern Sahara through the Arabian Peninsula to Pakistan and India.

There are multiple generations per year. Adults are on wing year round.

The larvae feed on Tamarix species.
