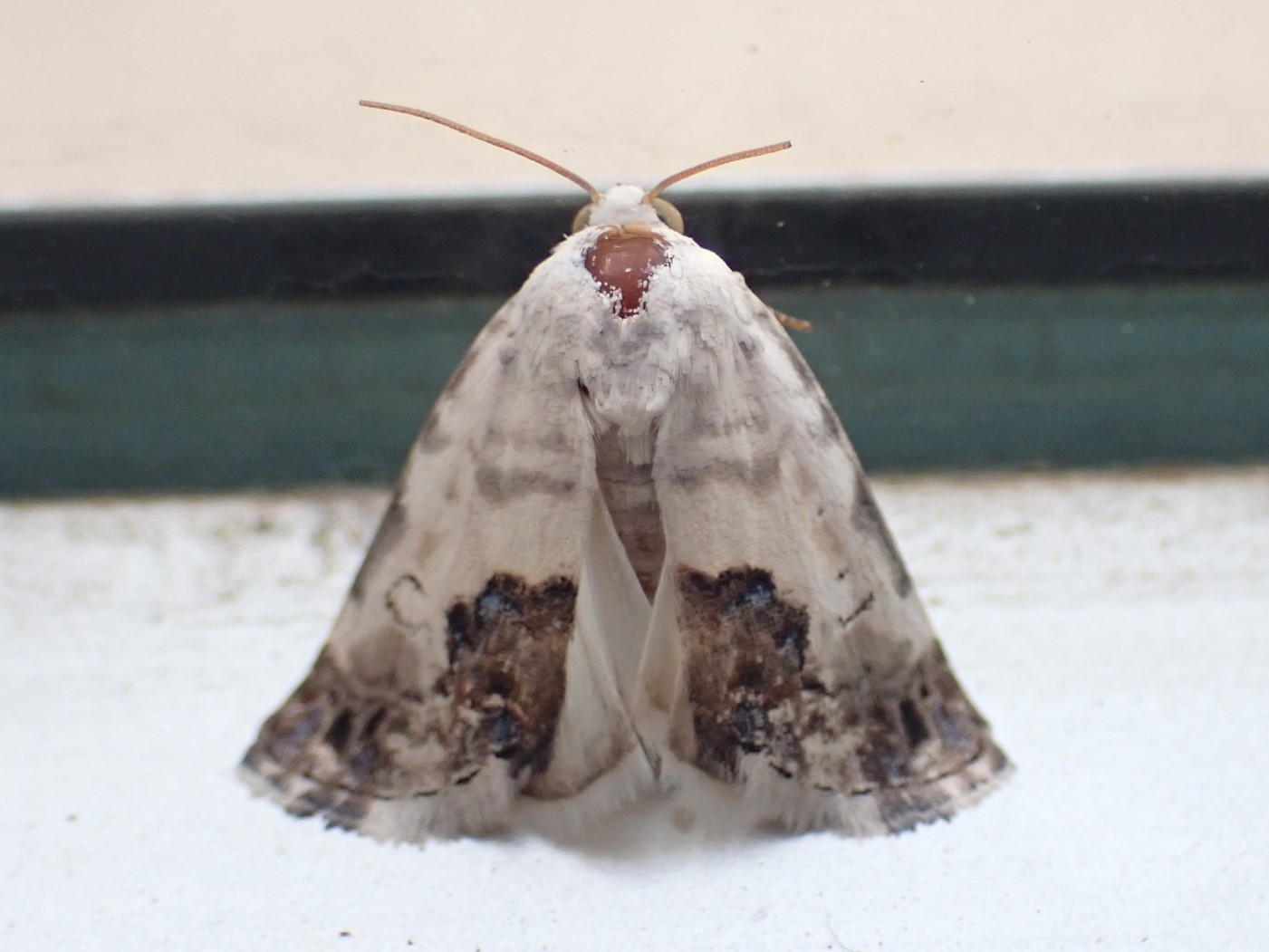

Scientific classification
- Kingdom: Animalia
- Phylum: Arthropoda
- Clade: Pancrustacea
- Class: Insecta
- Order: Lepidoptera
- Superfamily: Noctuoidea
- Family: Noctuidae
- Genus: Acontia
- Species: A. opalinoides

Binomial name
- Acontia opalinoides Guenée, 1852

Synonyms
- Calophasia postica Walker, 1865

= Acontia opalinoides =

Species of moth

Acontia opalinoides is a moth of the family Noctuidae first described by Achille Guenée in 1852.

== Distribution ==
It is found in many African countries such as Angola, Eritrea, Ethiopia, Kenya, Mali, Mauritania, Namibia, Somalia, Sudan and Tanzania. It is also found in Old World tropics of Sri Lanka, and India.

Host plants are Abutilon and Gossypium species.
