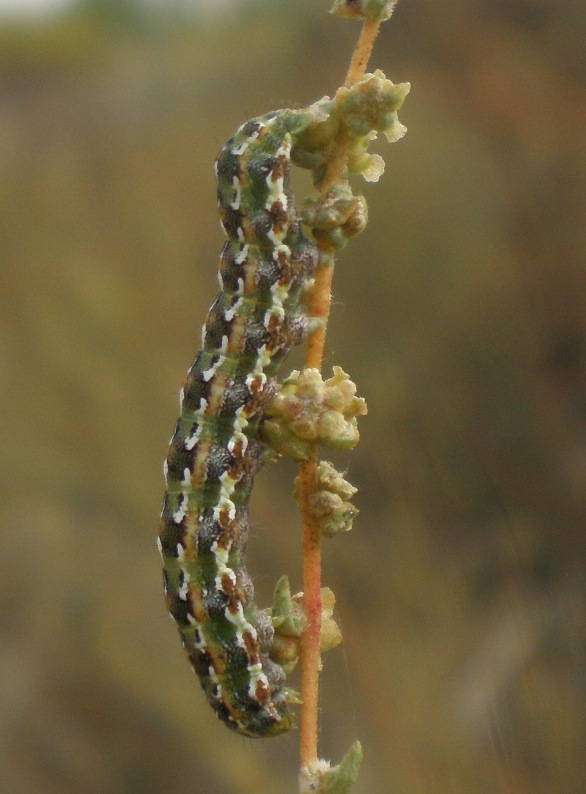

Scientific classification
- Domain: Eukaryota
- Kingdom: Animalia
- Phylum: Arthropoda
- Class: Insecta
- Order: Lepidoptera
- Superfamily: Noctuoidea
- Family: Noctuidae
- Genus: Cardepia
- Species: C. sociabilis

Binomial name
- Cardepia sociabilis (Graslin, 1850)

Synonyms
- Hadena sociabilis Graslin, 1850; Discestra pedrosai Monteiro, 1972; Mamestra afra Bethune-Baker, 1894; Discestra sociabilis

= Cardepia sociabilis =

Species of moth

Cardepia sociabilis is a species of moth of the family Noctuidae. It is found from Morocco to Chad through southern Europe, Turkey, Israel, Syria, the Arabian Peninsula to India.

Adults are on wing from March to November. There are multiple generations per year.

The larvae feed on various halophilous plants.

== Subspecies ==
- Cardepia sociabilis socialis
- Cardepia sociabilis deserticola (Syria)
- Cardepia sociabilis mauretanica (Algeria)
- Cardepia sociabilis canescens
- Cardepia sociabilis rajasthana
