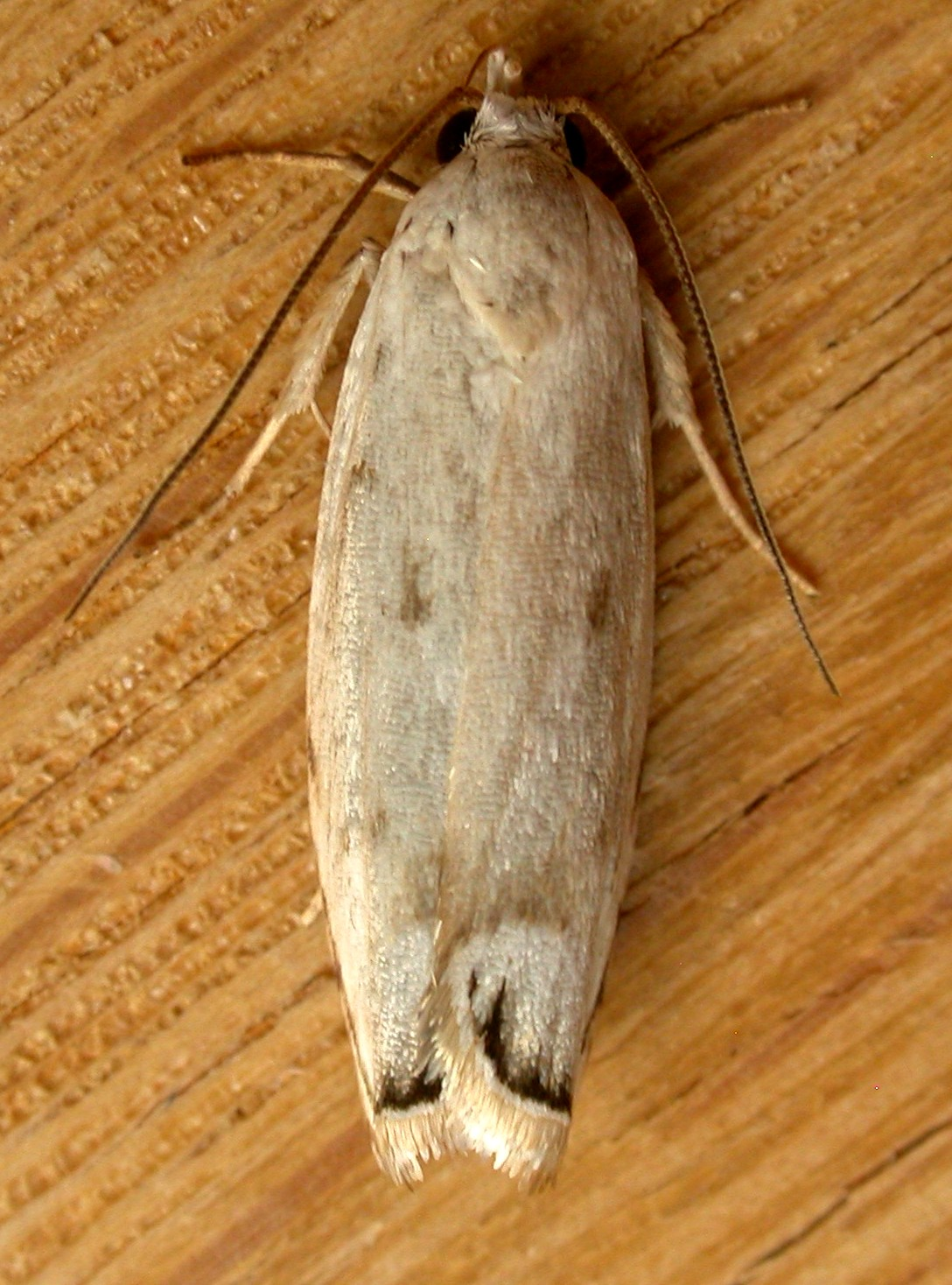

Scientific classification
- Kingdom: Animalia
- Phylum: Arthropoda
- Class: Insecta
- Order: Lepidoptera
- Family: Xyloryctidae
- Genus: Plectophila
- Species: P. discalis

Binomial name
- Plectophila discalis (Walker, 1865)

Synonyms
- Acontia discalis Walker, 1865; Lichenaula oxygona Lucas, 1895; Lichenaula inscripta Turner, 1898; Lichenaula ombralota Lower, 1901

= Plectophila discalis =

Species of moth

Plectophila discalis is a moth of the family Xyloryctidae first described by Francis Walker in 1865. It is found in Australia, where it has been recorded from New South Wales, Queensland and Victoria.

The wingspan is 20–25 mm. The forewings are white, in females with a light fuscous suffusion forming a cloudy fascia, its outer edge distinct and rectangularly angulated in the middle, from three-fifths of the costa to the inner margin before the anal angle, and occupying the entire dorsal two-thirds of the wing from the base up to this, except a cloudy white spot below the middle, sometimes sprinkled with dark fuscous longitudinally in the disc, and on the posterior margin of the fascia. In males, these markings are largely reduced or nearly obsolete, showing only partial indications of the posterior fascia and a small spot on the fold before middle. There is an irregular suffused fuscous streak along the hindmargin, the hindmarginal edge dark fuscous. The hindwings are pale whitish ochreous grey, the terminal half suffused with rather dark grey, the extreme apex whitish ochreous.

The larvae feed on Syncarpia glomulifera, Eucalyptus scabra, Cryptocarya glaucescens and Hibiscus tiliaceus. They feed from within a shelter of tied leaves.
