= Polypoetes villia =

Scientific classification
- Kingdom: Animalia
- Phylum: Arthropoda
- Class: Insecta
- Order: Lepidoptera
- Superfamily: Noctuoidea
- Family: Notodontidae
- Genus: Polypoetes
- Species: P. villia

Binomial name
- Polypoetes villia H. Druce, 1897

Synonyms
- Polypoetes denigrata Hering, 1928; Phaeochlaena longipalpis Warren, 1901

Species of moth

Polypoetes villia is a moth of the family Notodontidae first described by Herbert Druce in 1897. It is found in Panama and Costa Rica.

The larvae feed on Malvaviscus arboreus and Malvaviscus palmanus.
