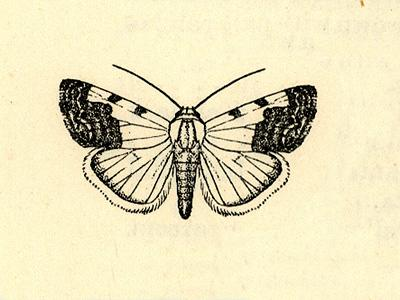

Scientific classification
- Kingdom: Animalia
- Phylum: Arthropoda
- Clade: Pancrustacea
- Class: Insecta
- Order: Lepidoptera
- Superfamily: Noctuoidea
- Family: Noctuidae
- Genus: Tarache
- Species: T. tetragona

Binomial name
- Tarache tetragona (Walker, 1858)

Synonyms
- Acontia tetragona Walker, 1858; Acontia alessandra Smith, 1903; Acontia aprica var. ceyvenstensis Dyar, 1904; Acontia redota Draudt, 1936; Tarache gonoides McDunnough, 1943

= Tarache tetragona =

Species of moth

Tarache tetragona, the four-spotted bird dropping moth, is a moth of the family Noctuidae. It is found from southern Florida south through the Caribbean and from eastern Texas south through Mexico and most of Central America to Costa Rica.

The wingspan is about 20 mm.

The larvae feed on Malvaviscus arboreus and Herssantia crispa.
