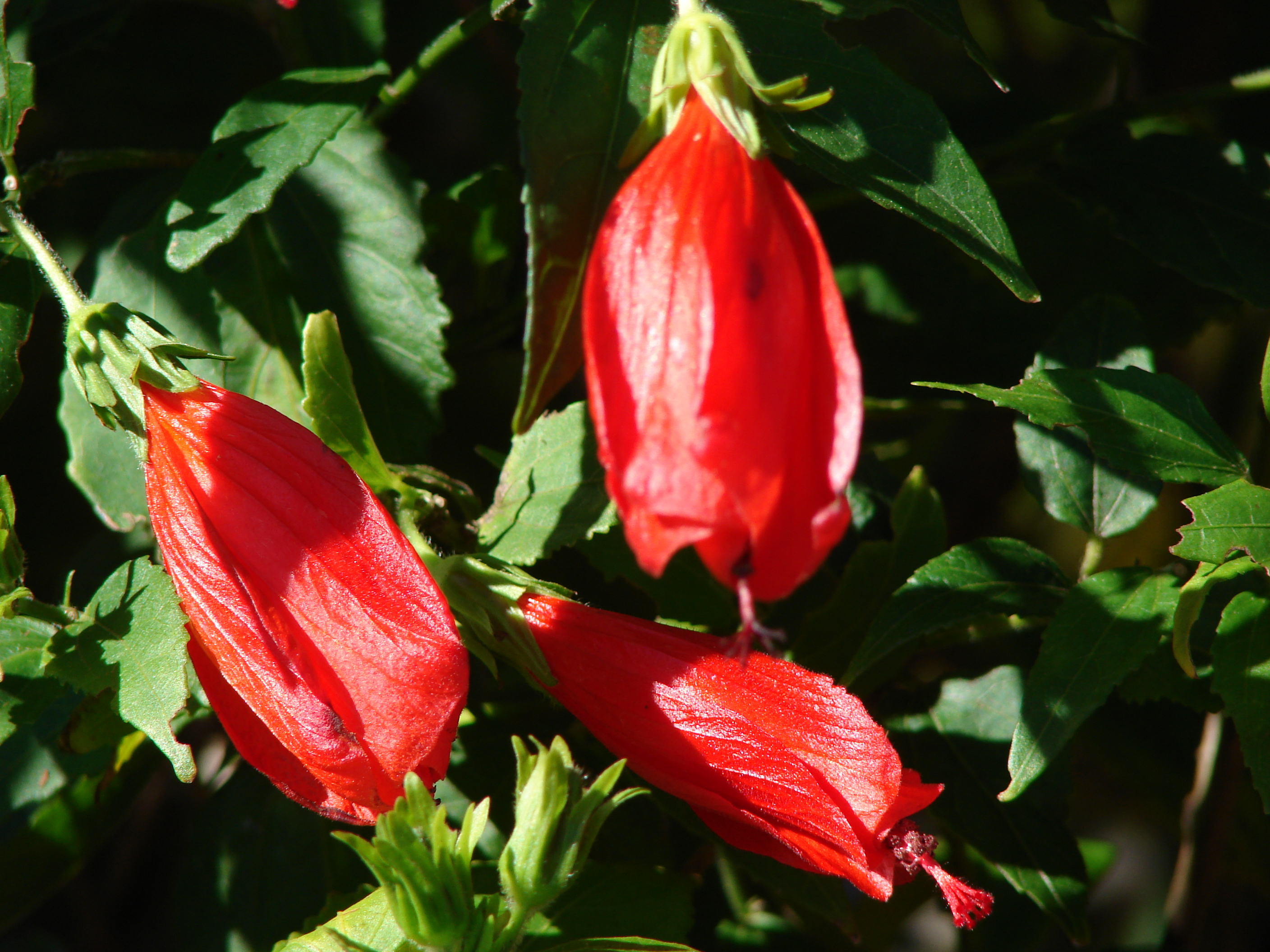

Scientific classification
- Kingdom: Plantae
- Clade: Tracheophytes
- Clade: Angiosperms
- Clade: Eudicots
- Clade: Rosids
- Order: Malvales
- Family: Malvaceae
- Genus: Malvaviscus
- Species: M. penduliflorus

Binomial name
- Malvaviscus penduliflorus Moc. & Sessé ex DC.

= Malvaviscus penduliflorus =

Species of flowering plants

Malvaviscus penduliflorus is a flowering plant in the family Malvaceae. It can be found in many tropical places including in the United States, South America, Asia, Australia, and several islands.

It's known by many names including mazapan, Turk's cap mallow, cardinal's hat, firecracker hibiscus, sleeping hibiscus, and sleepy mallow; some of these names are shared with other flowers, most especially Malvaviscus arboreus. Its name penduliflorus means "hanging flower"

It is widely cultivated as an ornamental plant, though it can also be eaten.

== Description ==
It is a perennial shrub that can reach up to 3–4 m (9.8–13.1 ft) tall. It produces red hanging tubular flowers with stamens that stick out. It has pointed, ovular leaves and hairy stems. Like other members the Malvaviscus genus, M. penduliflorus produces sap and small red fruits.

== Distribution ==
It is unknown where Malvaviscus penduliflorus is native to, though speculated to be Mexico, possibly as a cultivation of M. arboreus. It is cultivated and naturalized throughout tropical climates including North and South America, Oceania including Australia and New Zealand, Africa, Asia, and some islands.

== Synonyms ==
- Malvaviscus longifolius (A. St.-Hil.) Spach
- Malvaviscus arboreus var. longifolius Schery
- M. arboreus var. penduliflorus (DC.) Schery
- Malvaviscus arboreus subsp. penduliflorus (DC.) Hadac
