= Polypoetes luteivena =

Scientific classification
- Kingdom: Animalia
- Phylum: Arthropoda
- Class: Insecta
- Order: Lepidoptera
- Superfamily: Noctuoidea
- Family: Notodontidae
- Genus: Polypoetes
- Species: P. luteivena

Binomial name
- Polypoetes luteivena (Walker, 1864)

Synonyms
- Melanchroia luteivena Walker, 1864

Species of moth

Polypoetes luteivena is a moth of the family Notodontidae. It is found in Colombia and Venezuela.

The larvae feed on Paullinia macrophylla.
