= Polypoetes bifenestra =

Scientific classification
- Kingdom: Animalia
- Phylum: Arthropoda
- Class: Insecta
- Order: Lepidoptera
- Superfamily: Noctuoidea
- Family: Notodontidae
- Genus: Polypoetes
- Species: P. bifenestra

Binomial name
- Polypoetes bifenestra Miller, 2008

Species of moth

Polypoetes bifenestra is a moth of the family Notodontidae. It is found in cloud forests in the Oriente of northern Ecuador at elevations between 2,000 and 3,000 meters.

The length of the forewings is 10.5–13 mm for males and 13-13.5 mm for females.
