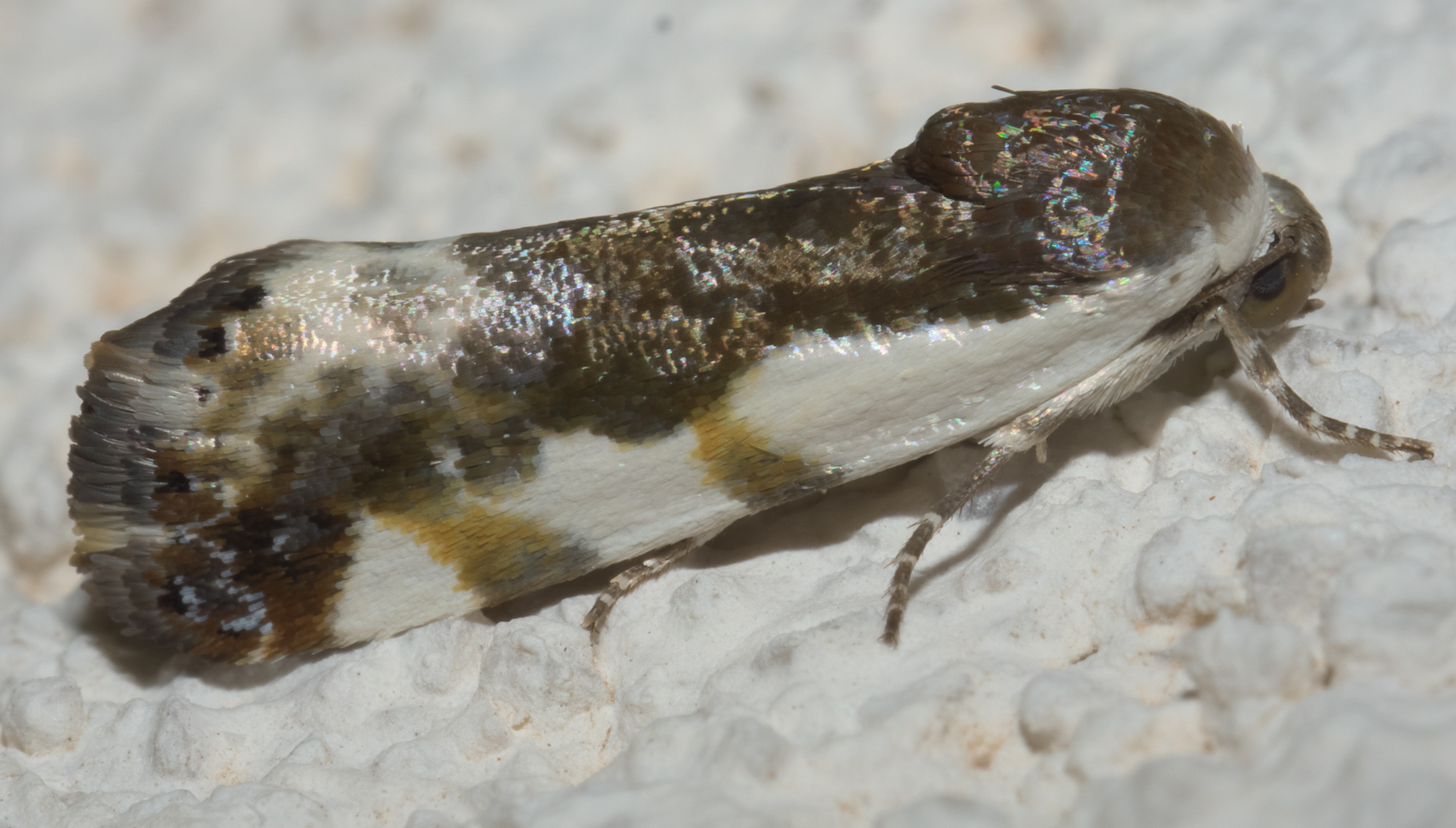

Scientific classification
- Kingdom: Animalia
- Phylum: Arthropoda
- Clade: Pancrustacea
- Class: Insecta
- Order: Lepidoptera
- Superfamily: Noctuoidea
- Family: Noctuidae
- Genus: Tarache
- Species: T. lanceolata

Binomial name
- Tarache lanceolata Grote, 1879

= Tarache lanceolata =

Species of moth

Tarache lanceolata is a species of bird dropping moth in the family Noctuidae first described by Augustus Radcliffe Grote in 1879. It is found in North America.

The MONA or Hodges number for Tarache lanceolata is 9153.
