= Polypoetes copiosa =

Scientific classification
- Kingdom: Animalia
- Phylum: Arthropoda
- Class: Insecta
- Order: Lepidoptera
- Superfamily: Noctuoidea
- Family: Notodontidae
- Genus: Polypoetes
- Species: P. copiosa

Binomial name
- Polypoetes copiosa Miller, 2008

Species of moth

Polypoetes copiosa is a moth of the family Notodontidae. It has a restricted distribution along the foothills of the Andes in western Ecuador.

The length of the forewings is 11–12 mm for males and 11.5–13.5 mm for females.
