= Polypoetes aterrima =

Scientific classification
- Kingdom: Animalia
- Phylum: Arthropoda
- Class: Insecta
- Order: Lepidoptera
- Superfamily: Noctuoidea
- Family: Notodontidae
- Genus: Polypoetes
- Species: P. aterrima

Binomial name
- Polypoetes aterrima (Dognin, 1913)

Synonyms
- Scotura aterrima Dognin, 1913

Species of moth

Polypoetes aterrima is a moth classified under the family Notodontidae. It is found in Colombia.
