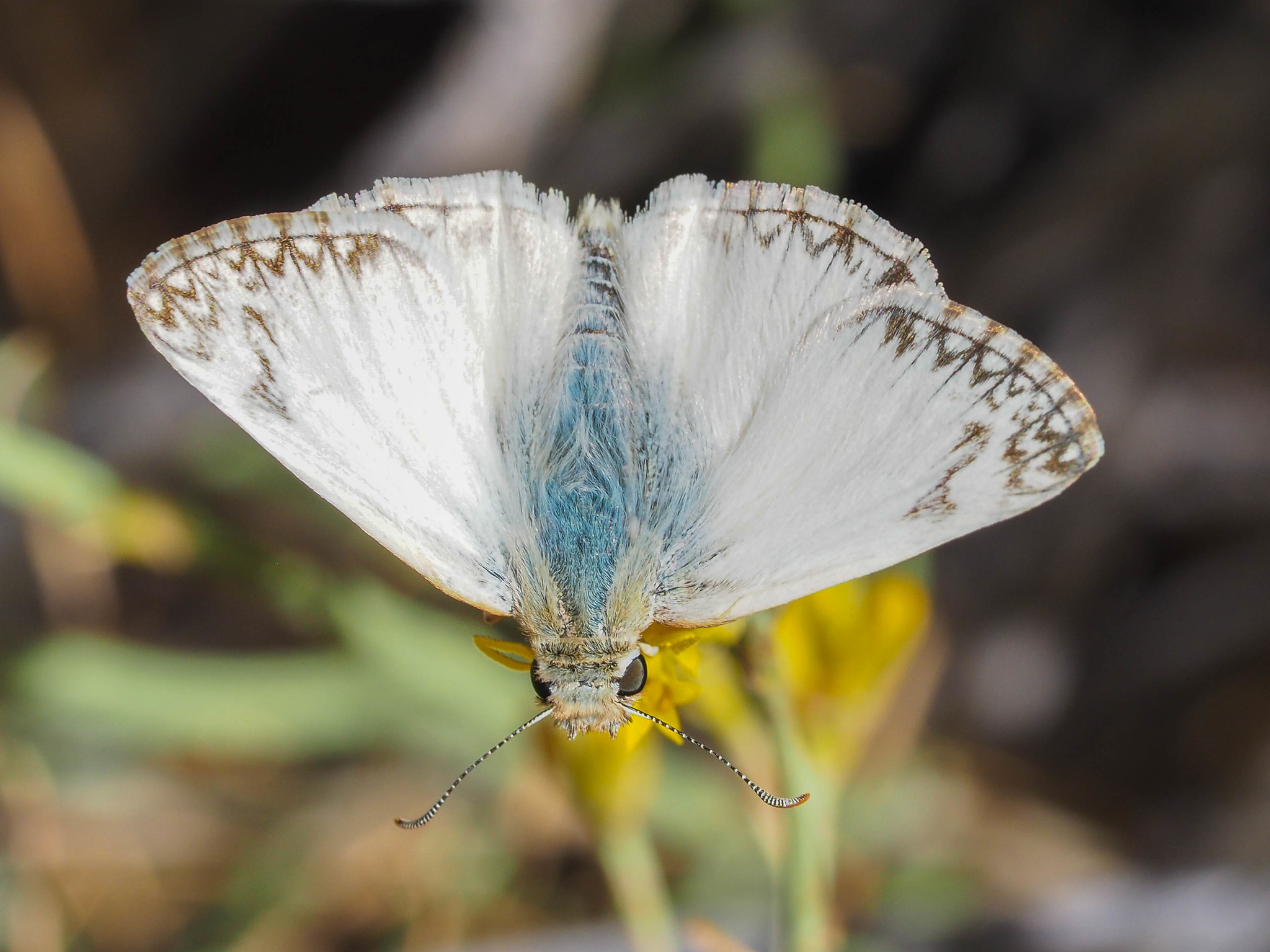
- Male
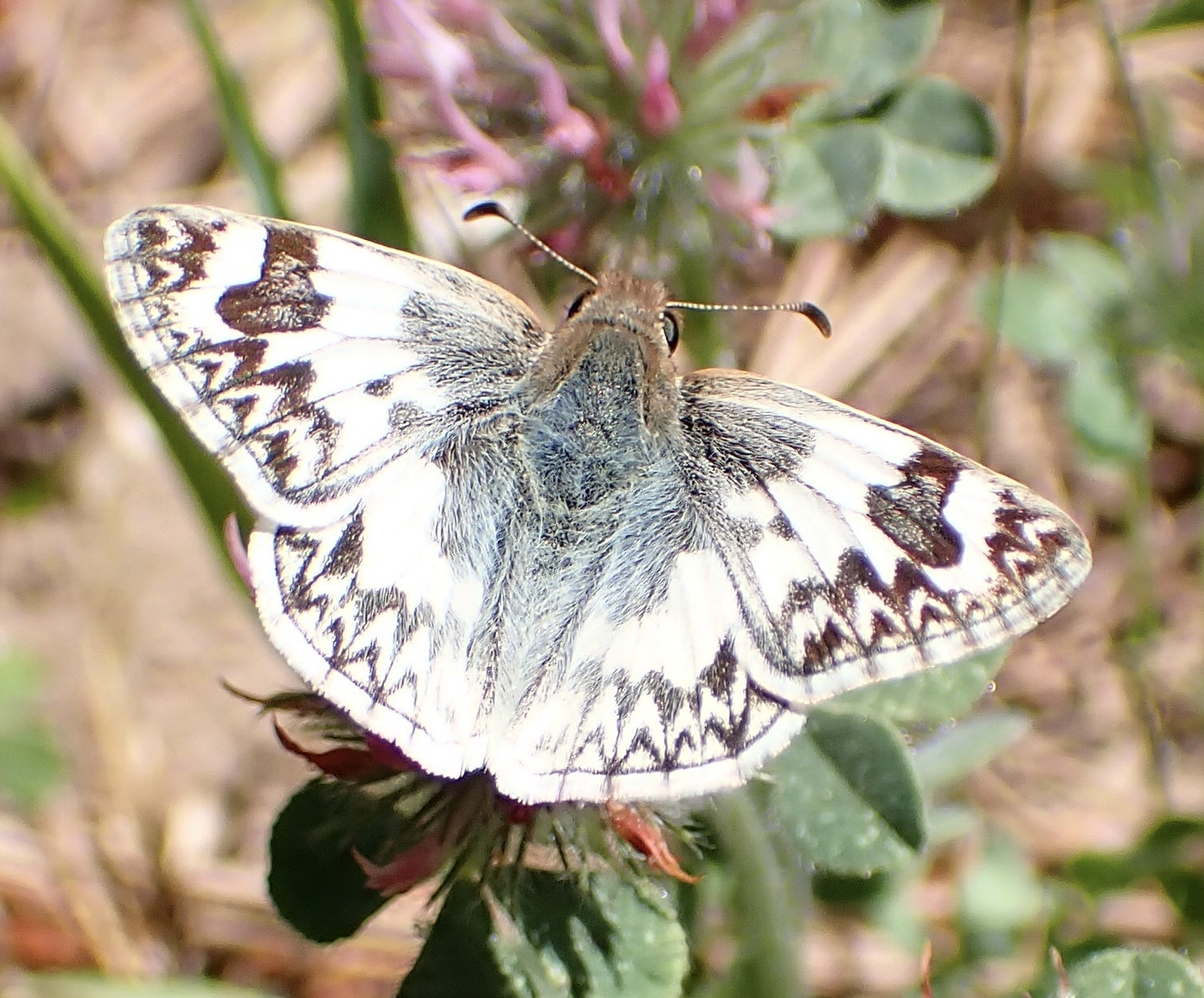
- Female

Scientific classification
- Kingdom: Animalia
- Phylum: Arthropoda
- Clade: Pancrustacea
- Class: Insecta
- Order: Lepidoptera
- Family: Hesperiidae
- Genus: Heliopetes
- Species: H. ericetorum

Binomial name
- Heliopetes ericetorum (Boisduval, 1852)

Synonyms
- Syrichtus ericetorum Boisduval, 1852; Syrichtus alba Edwards, 1866

= Heliopetes ericetorum =

Species of butterfly

Heliopetes ericetorum, the northern white-skipper, is a butterfly of the family Hesperiidae. It is found in North America in the United States from eastern Washington south to western Colorado, southern California and Arizona, and in Baja California in north-western Mexico. The habitat consists of open woodland, chaparral, dry washes, desert mountains and arid lands.

There are two broods per year, with adults on wing from April to October. Adult males are mostly white with black chevrons along the wings' margins. Adult females' marginal markings are larger and darker, and their wings have more gray or black at the base.

Larvae feed on the leaves of mallow species, including Sphaeralcea, Althaea and Malva species.
