= Polypoetes bistellata =

Scientific classification
- Kingdom: Animalia
- Phylum: Arthropoda
- Class: Insecta
- Order: Lepidoptera
- Superfamily: Noctuoidea
- Family: Notodontidae
- Genus: Polypoetes
- Species: P. bistellata

Binomial name
- Polypoetes bistellata Dognin, 1902

Species of moth

Polypoetes bistellata is a moth of the family Notodontidae. It is found in Argentina.
