= Polypoetes cuatropuntada =

Scientific classification
- Kingdom: Animalia
- Phylum: Arthropoda
- Clade: Pancrustacea
- Class: Insecta
- Order: Lepidoptera
- Superfamily: Noctuoidea
- Family: Notodontidae
- Genus: Polypoetes
- Species: P. cuatropuntada

Binomial name
- Polypoetes cuatropuntada Dognin, 1893

Species of moth

"Polypoetes" cuatropuntada is a moth of the family Notodontidae first described by Paul Dognin in 1893. It is found in Ecuador.

== Taxonomy ==
It belongs to the genus Polypoetes.
