= Tarache expolita =

Scientific classification
- Kingdom: Animalia
- Phylum: Arthropoda
- Clade: Pancrustacea
- Class: Insecta
- Order: Lepidoptera
- Superfamily: Noctuoidea
- Family: Noctuidae
- Genus: Tarache
- Species: T. expolita

Binomial name
- Tarache expolita Grote, 1882

Species of moth

Tarache expolita is a species of bird dropping moth in the family Noctuidae. It is found in North America.

The MONA or Hodges number for Tarache expolita is 9149.
