= Polypoetes mara =

Scientific classification
- Kingdom: Animalia
- Phylum: Arthropoda
- Class: Insecta
- Order: Lepidoptera
- Superfamily: Noctuoidea
- Family: Notodontidae
- Genus: Polypoetes
- Species: P. mara

Binomial name
- Polypoetes mara Hering, 1925

Species of moth

Polypoetes mara is a moth of the family Notodontidae. It is found in Peru.

The head and body are completely dark chocolate brown, with no markings of any kind.
