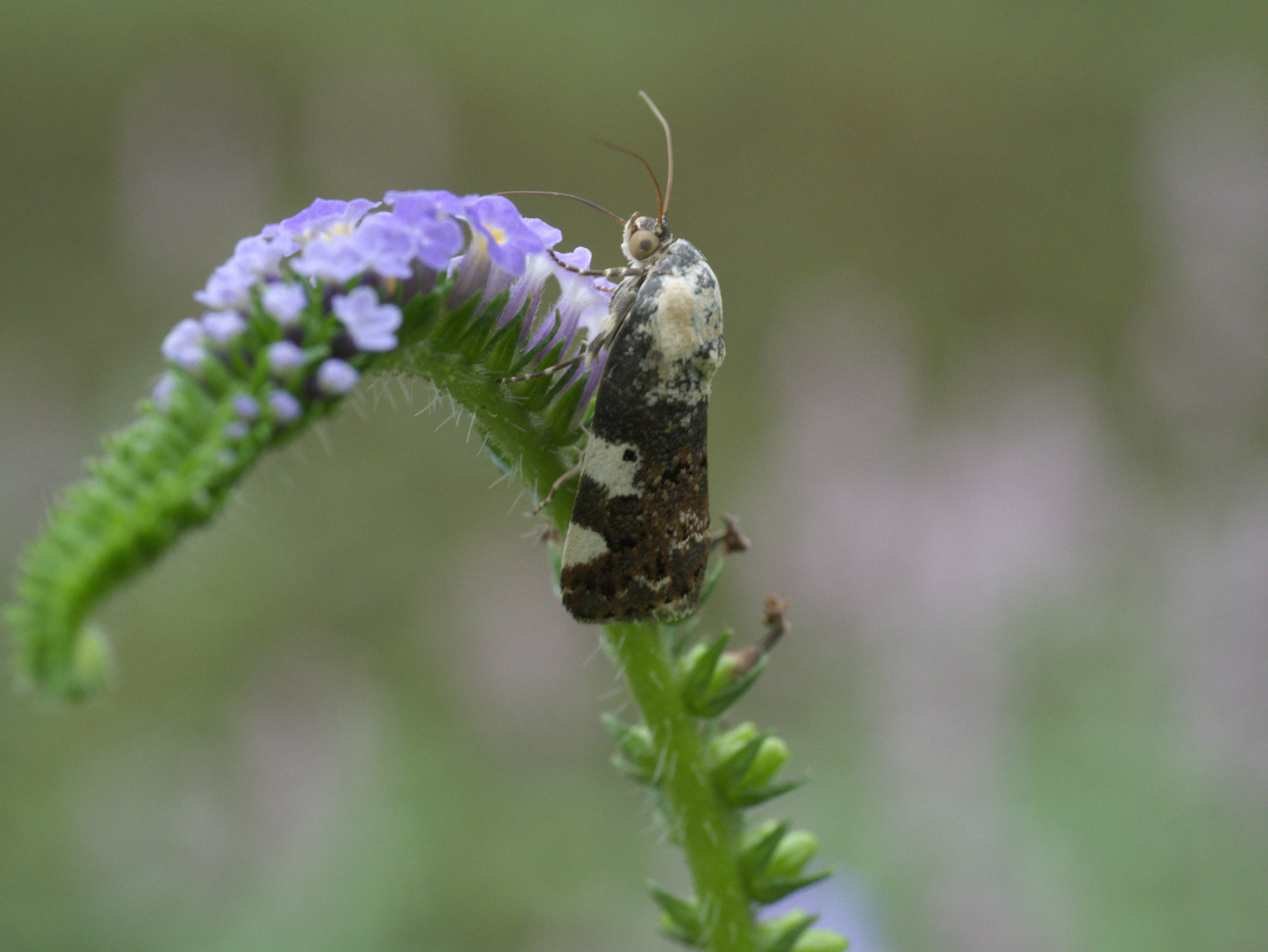
- Tarache aprica, exposed bird dropping moth

Scientific classification
- Kingdom: Animalia
- Phylum: Arthropoda
- Clade: Pancrustacea
- Class: Insecta
- Order: Lepidoptera
- Superfamily: Noctuoidea
- Family: Noctuidae
- Subfamily: Acontiinae
- Tribe: Acontiini
- Genus: Tarache; Hübner, [1823]

Synonyms
- Conacontia Smith, 1900; Therasea Grote, 1895; Hemispragueia Barnes & Benjamin, 1923; Trichotarache Grote, 1875

= Tarache =

Genus of moths

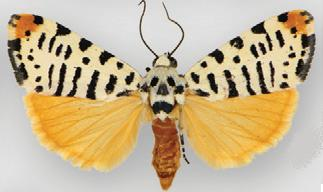
Tarache idella

Tarache is a genus of moths of the family Noctuidae erected by Jacob Hübner. It includes most former New World Acontia species. Lepidoptera and Some Other Life Forms and The Global Lepidoptera Names Index report this name as a synonym of Acontia.

== Description ==
Palpi porrect (extending forward), frons with rounded corneous projection. Larva with four pairs of abdominal prolegs.

== Species ==
- Tarache aprica species group:
  - Tarache aprica (Hübner, [1808])
  - Tarache abdominalis (Grote, 1877)
  - Tarache apela Druce, 1889
  - Tarache ardoris Hübner [1831]
  - Tarache assimilis (Grote, 1875)
  - Tarache cratina (Druce, 1889)
  - Tarache dacia (Druce, 1889)
  - Tarache delecta (Walker, [1858])
  - Tarache destricta Draudt, 1936
  - Tarache flavipennis (Grote, 1873)
  - Tarache isolata (Todd, 1960)
  - Tarache knowltoni (McDunnough, 1940)
  - Tarache lactipennis (Harvey, 1875)
  - Tarache lagunae ((Mustelin & Leuschner, 2000))
  - Tarache morides (Schaus, 1894) (syn: Tarache ochrochroa Druce, 1909)
  - Tarache parana (E. D. Jones, 1921)
  - Tarache phrygionis (Hampson, 1910)
  - Tarache quadriplaga (Smith, 1900) (syn: Tarache alessandra (Smith, 1903))
  - Tarache rufescens Hampson, 1910
  - Tarache sutor (Hampson, 1910)
  - Tarache tenuicula (Morrison, 1875)
  - Tarache terminimaculata (Grote, 1873)
  - Tarache tetragona (Walker, [1858])
- Tarache bilimeki species group:
  - Tarache acerba (H. Edwards, 1881) (syn: Tarache acerboides Poole, 1989)
  - Tarache albifusa (Ferris & Lafontaine, 2009)
  - Tarache areletta (Dyar, 1897)
  - Tarache areli (Strecker, 1898)
  - Tarache areloides (Barnes & McDunnough, 1912)
  - Tarache arida (Smith, 1900)
  - Tarache augustipennis Grote, 1875 (syn: Therasea flavicosta Smith, 1900)
  - Tarache axendra Schaus, 1898
  - Tarache bella (Barnes & Benjamin, 1922)
  - Tarache bilimeki (Felder & Rogenhofer, 1874) (syn: Tarache disconnecta Smith, 1903)
  - Tarache cora (Barnes & McDunnough, 1918)
  - Tarache expolita (Grote, 1882)
  - Tarache geminocula (Ferris & Lafontaine, 2009)
  - Tarache huachuca Smith, 1903 (syn: Therasea orba Smith, 1903)
  - Tarache idella (Barnes, 1905)
  - Tarache lanceolata Grote, 1879
  - Tarache major Smith, 1900
  - Tarache mizteca Schaus, 1898
  - Tarache phaenna (Druce, 1889)
  - Tarache sedata H. Edwards, 1881
  - Tarache toddi (Ferris & Lafontaine, 2009)
- Tarache lucasi species group:
  - Tarache lucasi Smith, 1900
  - Tarache vittamargo (Dyar, 1912)
