= Polypoetes pellucida =

Scientific classification
- Kingdom: Animalia
- Phylum: Arthropoda
- Class: Insecta
- Order: Lepidoptera
- Superfamily: Noctuoidea
- Family: Notodontidae
- Genus: Polypoetes
- Species: P. pellucida

Binomial name
- Polypoetes pellucida (Dognin, 1910)

Synonyms
- Scotura pellucida Dognin, 1910

Species of moth

Polypoetes pellucida is a moth of the family Notodontidae. It is found in Colombia.
