= Polypoetes albiscripta =

Scientific classification
- Kingdom: Animalia
- Phylum: Arthropoda
- Class: Insecta
- Order: Lepidoptera
- Superfamily: Noctuoidea
- Family: Notodontidae
- Genus: Polypoetes
- Species: P. albiscripta

Binomial name
- Polypoetes albiscripta Dognin, 1903

Species of moth

Polypoetes albiscripta is a moth of the family Notodontidae. It is found in Peru.
