= Polypoetes aniplata =

Scientific classification
- Kingdom: Animalia
- Phylum: Arthropoda
- Class: Insecta
- Order: Lepidoptera
- Superfamily: Noctuoidea
- Family: Notodontidae
- Genus: Polypoetes
- Species: P. aniplata

Binomial name
- Polypoetes aniplata Warren, 1906

Species of moth

Polypoetes aniplata is a moth of the family Notodontidae. It is found along the eastern slope of the Andes, at elevations between 1,400 and 1,800 meters, from southern Peru south to northern Bolivia.
