= Polypoetes empheres =

Scientific classification
- Kingdom: Animalia
- Phylum: Arthropoda
- Clade: Pancrustacea
- Class: Insecta
- Order: Lepidoptera
- Superfamily: Noctuoidea
- Family: Notodontidae
- Genus: Polypoetes
- Species: P. empheres

Binomial name
- Polypoetes empheres (L. B. Prout, 1918)

Synonyms
- Momonipta empheres Prout, 1918

Species of moth

Polypoetes empheres is a moth of the family Notodontidae. It is found in south-eastern Peru.
