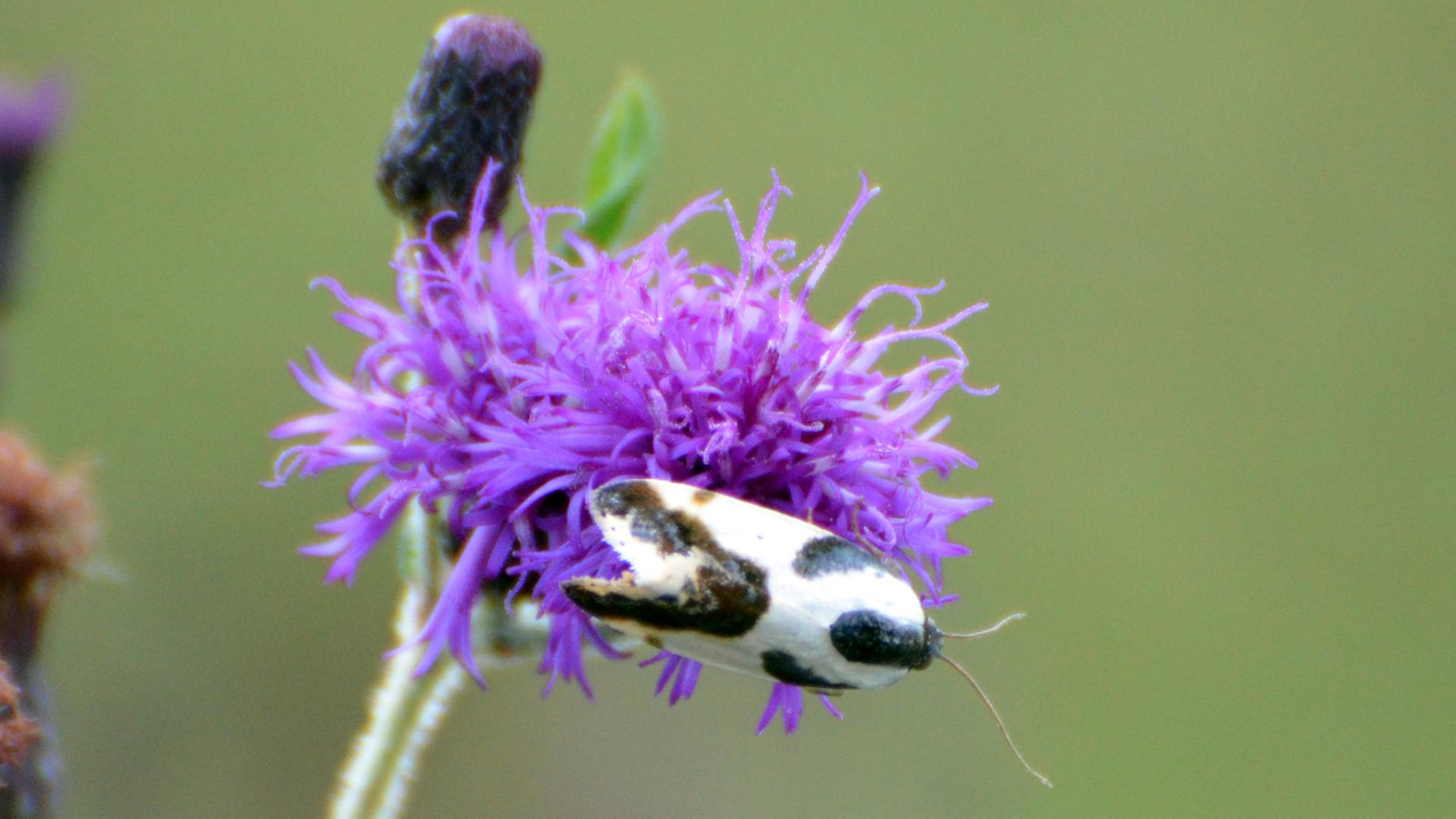

Scientific classification
- Kingdom: Animalia
- Phylum: Arthropoda
- Clade: Pancrustacea
- Class: Insecta
- Order: Lepidoptera
- Superfamily: Noctuoidea
- Family: Noctuidae
- Tribe: Acontiini
- Genus: Tarache
- Species: T. delecta

Binomial name
- Tarache delecta (Walker, 1858)

= Tarache delecta =

Species of moth

Tarache delecta, the delightful bird dropping moth, is a bird dropping moth in the family Noctuidae. The species was first described by Francis Walker in 1858.

The MONA or Hodges number for Tarache delecta is 9146.

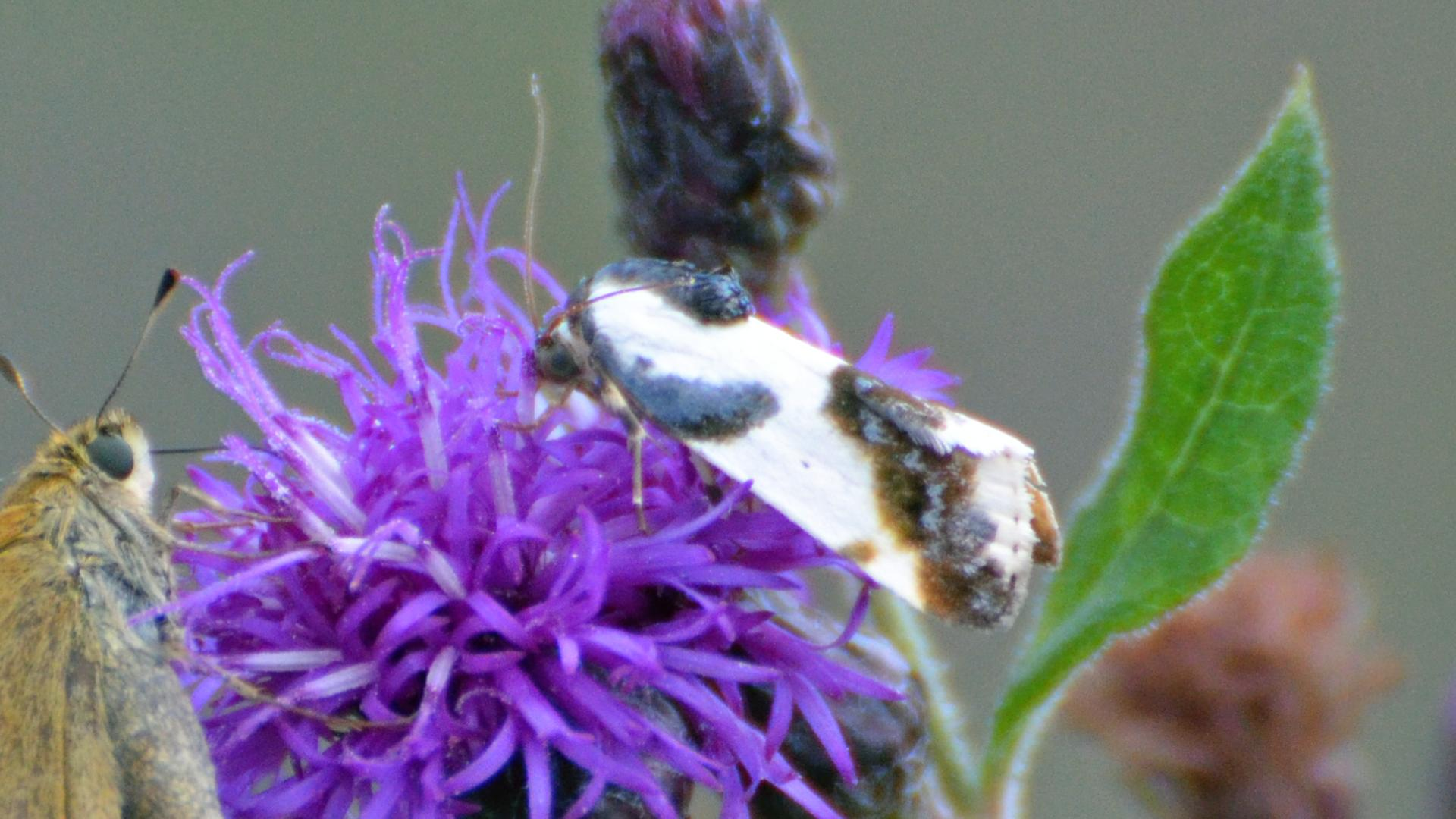
Delightful bird dropping moth, Tarache delecta
