= Polypoetes trimacula =

Scientific classification
- Kingdom: Animalia
- Phylum: Arthropoda
- Class: Insecta
- Order: Lepidoptera
- Superfamily: Noctuoidea
- Family: Notodontidae
- Genus: Polypoetes
- Species: P. trimacula

Binomial name
- Polypoetes trimacula (Warren, 1904)

Synonyms
- Stenoplastis trimacula Warren, 1904

Species of moth

Polypoetes trimacula is a moth of the family Notodontidae. It is found in Colombia and Ecuador.
