= Polypoetes sumaco =

Scientific classification
- Kingdom: Animalia
- Phylum: Arthropoda
- Class: Insecta
- Order: Lepidoptera
- Superfamily: Noctuoidea
- Family: Notodontidae
- Genus: Polypoetes
- Species: P. sumaco

Binomial name
- Polypoetes sumaco Miller, 2008

Species of moth

Polypoetes sumaco is a moth of the family Notodontidae. It is found in eastern Ecuador.
