= Polypoetes pallinervis =

Scientific classification
- Kingdom: Animalia
- Phylum: Arthropoda
- Class: Insecta
- Order: Lepidoptera
- Superfamily: Noctuoidea
- Family: Notodontidae
- Genus: Polypoetes
- Species: P. pallinervis

Binomial name
- Polypoetes pallinervis (Felder, 1875)

Synonyms
- Stenoplastis pallinervis Felder, 1875

Species of moth

Polypoetes pallinervis is a moth of the family Notodontidae. It is found in Colombia.
