= Tarache bella =

Scientific classification
- Kingdom: Animalia
- Phylum: Arthropoda
- Clade: Pancrustacea
- Class: Insecta
- Order: Lepidoptera
- Superfamily: Noctuoidea
- Family: Noctuidae
- Genus: Tarache
- Species: T. bella

Binomial name
- Tarache bella Barnes & Benjamin, 1922

Species of moth

Tarache bella is a species of bird-dropping moth in the family Noctuidae first described by William Barnes and Foster Hendrickson Benjamin in 1922. It is found in North America.

The MONA or Hodges number for Tarache bella is 9147.
