= Tarache arida =

Scientific classification
- Kingdom: Animalia
- Phylum: Arthropoda
- Clade: Pancrustacea
- Class: Insecta
- Order: Lepidoptera
- Superfamily: Noctuoidea
- Family: Noctuidae
- Genus: Tarache
- Species: T. arida

Binomial name
- Tarache arida (Smith, 1900)

Species of moth

Tarache arida is a moth in the family Noctuidae (owlet moths) described by Smith in 1900. It is found in North America.

The MONA or Hodges number for Tarache arida is 9150.
