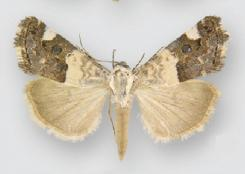
- Female
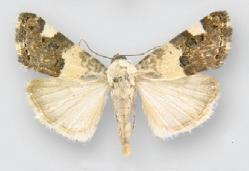
- Male

Scientific classification
- Kingdom: Animalia
- Phylum: Arthropoda
- Clade: Pancrustacea
- Class: Insecta
- Order: Lepidoptera
- Superfamily: Noctuoidea
- Family: Noctuidae
- Genus: Tarache
- Species: T. toddi

Binomial name
- Tarache toddi (Ferris & Lafontaine, 2009)

Synonyms
- Acontia toddi Ferris & Lafontaine, 2009

= Tarache toddi =

Species of moth

Tarache toddi is a moth of the family Noctuidae. The species was found in 2009 by Clifford D. Ferris and Donald Lafontaine in southwestern North America.
