= Polypoetes eximia =

Scientific classification
- Kingdom: Animalia
- Phylum: Arthropoda
- Class: Insecta
- Order: Lepidoptera
- Superfamily: Noctuoidea
- Family: Notodontidae
- Genus: Polypoetes
- Species: P. eximia

Binomial name
- Polypoetes eximia (Warren, 1909)

Synonyms
- Stenoplastis eximia Warren, 1909

Species of moth

Polypoetes eximia is a moth of the family Notodontidae. It is found in Peru.
