= Polypoetes (moth) =

Scientific classification
- Kingdom: Animalia
- Phylum: Arthropoda
- Clade: Pancrustacea
- Class: Insecta
- Order: Lepidoptera
- Superfamily: Noctuoidea
- Family: Notodontidae
- Tribe: Dioptini
- Genus: Polypoetes; Druce, 1885

Genus of moths

Polypoetes is a genus of moths of the family Notodontidae. It consists of the following species:

- Polypoetes aborta (Dognin, 1913)
- Polypoetes albicuneata Dognin, 1910
- Polypoetes albiscripta Dognin, 1903
- Polypoetes aniplata Warren, 1906
- Polypoetes approximans Warren, 1901
- Polypoetes aterrima (Dognin, 1913)
- Polypoetes augustimacula Dognin, 1902
- Polypoetes bifenestra Miller, 2008
- Polypoetes bistellata Dognin, 1902
- Polypoetes circumfumata Warren, 1901
- Polypoetes colana Druce, 1893
- Polypoetes copiosa Miller, 2008
- Polypoetes corneola Miller, 2008
- Polypoetes crenulata Miller, 2008
- Polypoetes cuatropuntada Dognin, 1893
- Polypoetes deldon Druce, 1885
- Polypoetes disconnexa Dognin, 1911
- Polypoetes dynastes Hering, 1925
- Polypoetes empheres (Prout, 1918)
- Polypoetes eriphus Druce, 1885
- Polypoetes etearchus Druce, 1885
- Polypoetes exclamationis Hering, 1925
- Polypoetes exclusa Hering, 1925
- Polypoetes eximia (Warren, 1909)
- Polypoetes fenestrata Hering, 1925
- Polypoetes forficata Miller, 2008
- Polypoetes fuliginosa Dognin, 1904
- Polypoetes haruspex Druce, 1885
- Polypoetes ineldo Schaus, 1933
- Polypoetes integra Hering, 1925
- Polypoetes intersita Hering, 1925
- Polypoetes jipiro Dognin, 1893
- Polypoetes leuschneri Miller, 2008
- Polypoetes luteivena (Walker, 1864)
- Polypoetes mara Hering, 1925
- Polypoetes marginifer Dyar, 1913
- Polypoetes milleri Prada, Jimenez-Bolivar & St Laurent, 2023
- Polypoetes nigribasalis Hering, 1925
- Polypoetes nox Druce, 1909
- Polypoetes nubilosa (Warren, 1900)
- Polypoetes obtusa (Walker, 1856)
- Polypoetes opaca (Hering, 1925)
- Polypoetes oteroi Miller, 2008
- Polypoetes pallinervis (Felder, 1874)
- Polypoetes pellucida (Dognin, 1910)
- Polypoetes persimilis (Dognin, 1913)
- Polypoetes picaria Warren, 1904
- Polypoetes prodromus Hering, 1925
- Polypoetes rubribasis (Hering, 1925)
- Polypoetes rufipuncta Schaus, 1894
- Polypoetes selenia C. and R. Felder, 1874
- Polypoetes semicoerulea Dognin, 1910
- Polypoetes subcandidata Dognin, 1910
- Polypoetes sublucens Dognin, 1909
- Polypoetes suffumosa Dognin, 1902
- Polypoetes sumaco Miller, 2008
- Polypoetes tenebrosa Warren, 1907
- Polypoetes tinalandia Miller, 2008
- Polypoetes trimacula (Warren, 1904)
- Polypoetes tulipa Miller, 2008
- Polypoetes vidua Warren, 1909
- Polypoetes villia Druce, 1897
- Polypoetes villiodes (Prout, 1918)
- Polypoetes villiopsis (Hering, 1925)
- Polypoetes wagneri Miller, 2008
