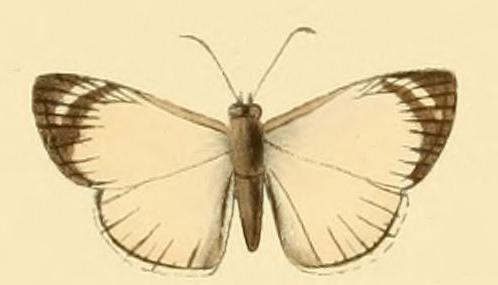

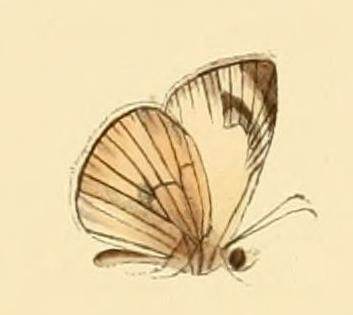

Scientific classification
- Kingdom: Animalia
- Phylum: Arthropoda
- Clade: Pancrustacea
- Class: Insecta
- Order: Lepidoptera
- Family: Hesperiidae
- Genus: Heliopetes
- Species: H. leucola

Binomial name
- Heliopetes leucola (Hewitson, 1868)

Synonyms
- Leucochitonea leucola Hewitson, 1868; Heliopetes asna Evans, 1944

= Heliopetes leucola =

Species of butterfly

Heliopetes leucola is a butterfly in the family Hesperiidae. It is found in Brazil in the states of Minas Gerais and Paraná.
