= Polypoetes rufipuncta =

Scientific classification
- Kingdom: Animalia
- Phylum: Arthropoda
- Class: Insecta
- Order: Lepidoptera
- Superfamily: Noctuoidea
- Family: Notodontidae
- Genus: Polypoetes
- Species: P. rufipuncta

Binomial name
- Polypoetes rufipuncta Schaus, 1894

Species of moth

Polypoetes rufipuncta is a moth of the family Notodontidae. It is found in south-eastern Brazil.
