= Polypoetes exclamationis =

Scientific classification
- Kingdom: Animalia
- Phylum: Arthropoda
- Class: Insecta
- Order: Lepidoptera
- Superfamily: Noctuoidea
- Family: Notodontidae
- Genus: Polypoetes
- Species: P. exclamationis

Binomial name
- Polypoetes exclamationis Hering, 1925

Species of moth

Polypoetes exclamationis is a moth of the family Notodontidae. It is found in Bolivia.
