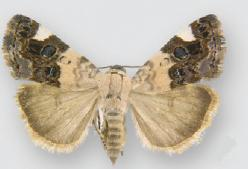
- Female
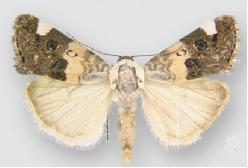
- Male

Scientific classification
- Kingdom: Animalia
- Phylum: Arthropoda
- Clade: Pancrustacea
- Class: Insecta
- Order: Lepidoptera
- Superfamily: Noctuoidea
- Family: Noctuidae
- Genus: Tarache
- Species: T. areli

Binomial name
- Tarache areli Strecker, 1898

Synonyms
- Acontia monstrosa; Acontia areli Strecker, 1898

= Tarache areli =

Species of moth

Tarache areli is a moth of the family Noctuidae first described by Herman Strecker in 1898. It is found in North America in Arizona, California, Colorado, Nevada, New Mexico, Texas, Utah, British Columbia and Mexico.

The length of the forewings is 10–12.5 mm for males and 10–12 mm for females. Adults are on wing from July to August depending on the location.
