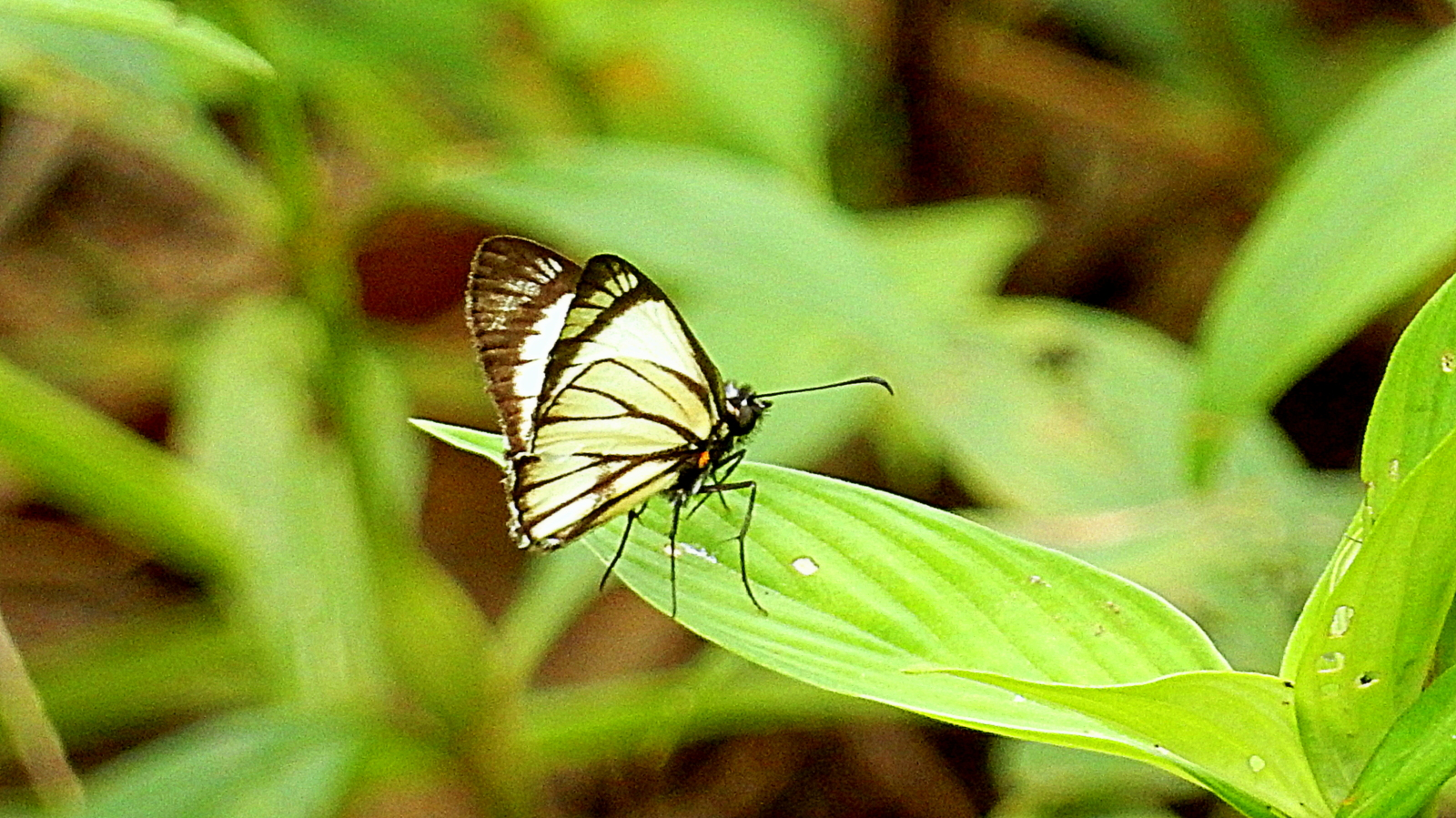
- Heliopetes arsalte, veined white-skipper

Scientific classification
- Kingdom: Animalia
- Phylum: Arthropoda
- Clade: Pancrustacea
- Class: Insecta
- Order: Lepidoptera
- Family: Hesperiidae
- Subfamily: Pyrginae
- Tribe: Pyrgini
- Genus: Heliopetes; Billberg, 1820

Subgenera
- Heliopetes Billberg, 1820; Heliopyrgus; Leucoscirtes

Synonyms
- Leucoscirtes Scudder, 1872

= Heliopetes =

Genus of butterflies

Heliopetes is a Neotropical genus of spread-winged skipper butterflies in the family Hesperiidae.

== Species ==
These species belong to the genus Heliopetes:

Heliopetes alana (Reakirt, 1868) (alana white-skipper)
Heliopetes americanus (Blanchard, 1852)
Heliopetes arsalte (Linnaeus, 1758) (veined white-skipper)
Heliopetes chimbo Evans, 1953
Heliopetes domicella (Erichson, 1849) (Erichson's white-skipper)
Heliopetes ericetorum (Boisduval, 1852) (northern white-skipper)
Heliopetes laviana (Hewitson, 1868) (laviana white-skipper)
Heliopetes leucola (Hewitson, 1868)
Heliopetes libra Evans, 1944
Heliopetes macaira (Reakirt, 1867) (Turk's-cap white-skipper)
Heliopetes marginata Hayward, 1940
Heliopetes nivella (Mabille, 1883)
Heliopetes ochroleuca J. Zikán, 1938
Heliopetes omrina (A. Butler, 1870) (stained white-skipper)
Heliopetes orbigera (Mabille, 1888)
Heliopetes petrus (Hübner, [1819])
Heliopetes purgia Schaus, 1902
Heliopetes sublinea Schaus, 1902 (east-mexican white-skipper)
