= Polypoetes etearchus =

Scientific classification
- Kingdom: Animalia
- Phylum: Arthropoda
- Class: Insecta
- Order: Lepidoptera
- Superfamily: Noctuoidea
- Family: Notodontidae
- Genus: Polypoetes
- Species: P. etearchus

Binomial name
- Polypoetes etearchus H. Druce, 1885

Species of moth

Polypoetes etearchus is a moth of the family Notodontidae first described by Herbert Druce in 1885. It is found in south-western Costa Rica and north-western Panama.
