= Polypoetes crenulata =

Scientific classification
- Kingdom: Animalia
- Phylum: Arthropoda
- Class: Insecta
- Order: Lepidoptera
- Superfamily: Noctuoidea
- Family: Notodontidae
- Genus: Polypoetes
- Species: P. crenulata

Binomial name
- Polypoetes crenulata Miller, 2008

Species of moth

Polypoetes crenulata is a moth of the family Notodontidae. It is found in western Ecuador.

The length of the forewings is 12–13 mm for males.
