= Tarache apela =

Scientific classification
- Kingdom: Animalia
- Phylum: Arthropoda
- Clade: Pancrustacea
- Class: Insecta
- Order: Lepidoptera
- Superfamily: Noctuoidea
- Family: Noctuidae
- Tribe: Acontiini
- Genus: Tarache
- Species: T. apela

Binomial name
- Tarache apela (Druce, 1889)

Species of moth

Tarache apela is a species of bird dropping moth in the family Noctuidae.

The MONA or Hodges number for Tarache apela is 9133.
