= Tarache bilimeki =

Scientific classification
- Kingdom: Animalia
- Phylum: Arthropoda
- Clade: Pancrustacea
- Class: Insecta
- Order: Lepidoptera
- Superfamily: Noctuoidea
- Family: Noctuidae
- Tribe: Acontiini
- Genus: Tarache
- Species: T. bilimeki

Binomial name
- Tarache bilimeki (Felder & Rogenhofer, 1874)

Synonyms
- Tarache disconnecta (Smith, 1903)

Species of moth

Tarache bilimeki is a species of bird dropping moth in the family Noctuidae.

The MONA or Hodges number for Tarache bilimeki is 9157.
