= Polypoetes deldon =

Scientific classification
- Kingdom: Animalia
- Phylum: Arthropoda
- Class: Insecta
- Order: Lepidoptera
- Superfamily: Noctuoidea
- Family: Notodontidae
- Genus: Polypoetes
- Species: P. deldon

Binomial name
- Polypoetes deldon H. Druce, 1885

Species of moth

Polypoetes deldon is a moth of the family Notodontidae first described by Herbert Druce in 1885. It is found in Guatemala.
