= Polypoetes selenia =

Scientific classification
- Kingdom: Animalia
- Phylum: Arthropoda
- Class: Insecta
- Order: Lepidoptera
- Superfamily: Noctuoidea
- Family: Notodontidae
- Genus: Polypoetes
- Species: P. selenia

Binomial name
- Polypoetes selenia C. Felder & R. Felder, 1874

Species of moth

Polypoetes selenia is a moth of the family Notodontidae. It is found in Brazil.
