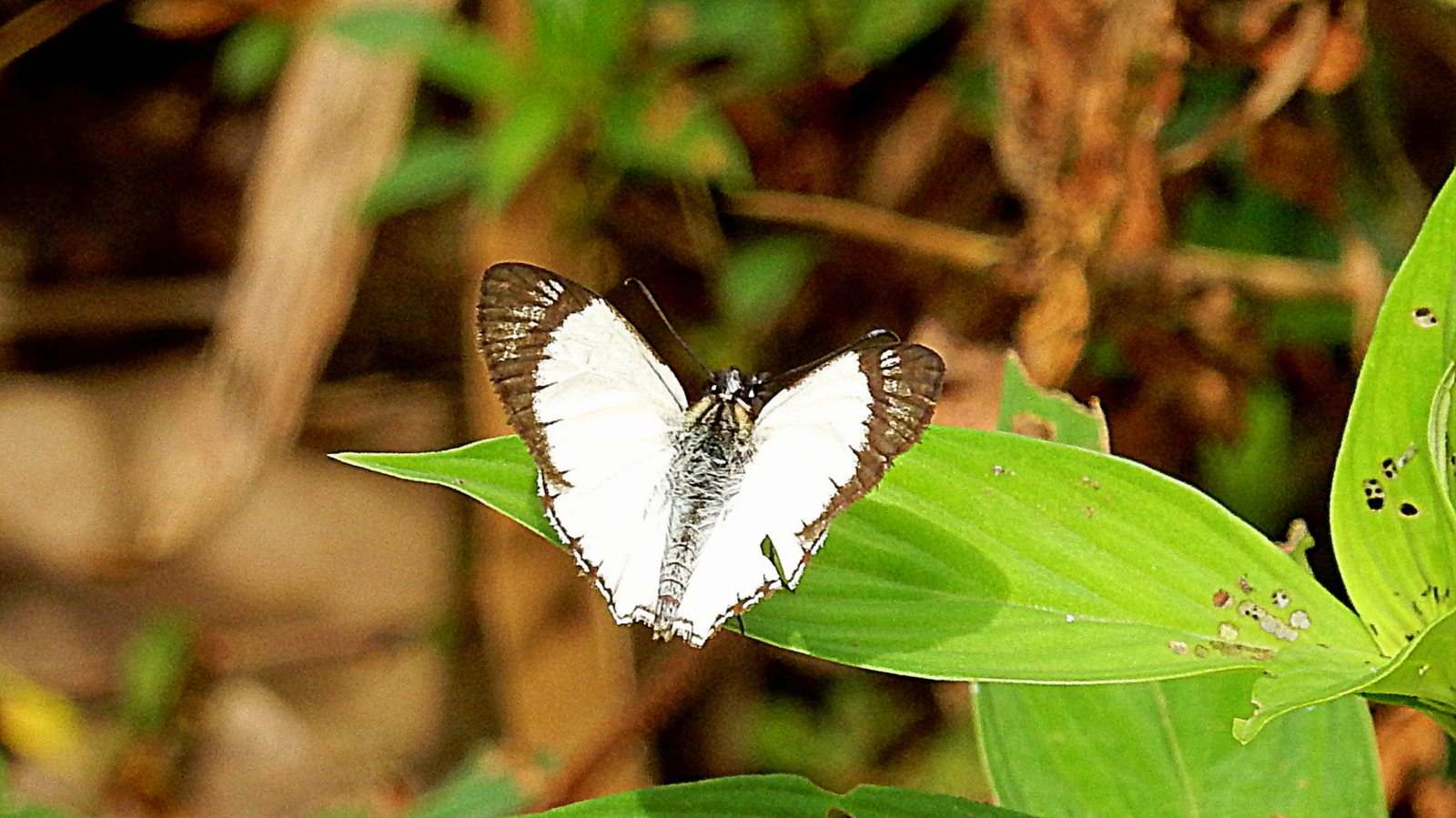

Scientific classification
- Kingdom: Animalia
- Phylum: Arthropoda
- Clade: Pancrustacea
- Class: Insecta
- Order: Lepidoptera
- Family: Hesperiidae
- Genus: Heliopetes
- Species: H. arsalte

Binomial name
- Heliopetes arsalte (Linnaeus, 1758)

Synonyms
- Papilio (Danaus) arsalte Linnaeus, 1758; Papilio niveus Cramer, 1775; Pyrgus figara Butler, 1870; Heliopetes arsalte arsalte (Linnaeus); Draudt, 1924

= Heliopetes arsalte =

Species of butterfly

Heliopetes arsalte, commonly known as the veined white-skipper, is a species of spread-wing skipper butterfly in the family Hesperiidae. It is widely distributed across Central and South America, ranging from Argentina north to Mexico, and occasionally appearing as a rare stray in southern Texas.
