= Polypoetes forficata =

Scientific classification
- Kingdom: Animalia
- Phylum: Arthropoda
- Class: Insecta
- Order: Lepidoptera
- Superfamily: Noctuoidea
- Family: Notodontidae
- Genus: Polypoetes
- Species: P. forficata

Binomial name
- Polypoetes forficata Miller, 2008

Species of moth

Polypoetes forficata is a moth of the family Notodontidae. It is found in eastern Ecuador.

The length of the forewings is 12 to 14 millimetres (0.47 to 0.55 in) for males and 13.5 to 15 millimetres (0.53 to 0.59 in) for females.

The larvae feed on Psammisia species.
