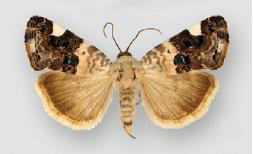
- Female
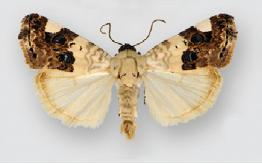
- Male

Scientific classification
- Kingdom: Animalia
- Phylum: Arthropoda
- Clade: Pancrustacea
- Class: Insecta
- Order: Lepidoptera
- Superfamily: Noctuoidea
- Family: Noctuidae
- Genus: Tarache
- Species: T. geminocula

Binomial name
- Tarache geminocula (Ferris & Lafontaine, 2009)

Synonyms
- Acontia geminocula Ferris & Lafontaine, 2009

= Tarache geminocula =

Species of moth

Tarache geminocula is a moth of the family Noctuidae first described by Clifford D. Ferris and J. Donald Lafontaine in 2009. It is found in the US states of Arizona and Texas, down to Chihuahua, Mexico.

The length of the forewings is 10–11 mm for males and 10–12 mm for females. Adults are on wing from July to September depending on the location.
