= Polypoetes jipiro =

Scientific classification
- Kingdom: Animalia
- Phylum: Arthropoda
- Class: Insecta
- Order: Lepidoptera
- Superfamily: Noctuoidea
- Family: Notodontidae
- Genus: Polypoetes
- Species: P. jipiro

Binomial name
- Polypoetes jipiro Dognin, 1893

Species of moth

Polypoetes jipiro is a moth of the family Notodontidae. It is endemic to cloud forests along the eastern slope of the Ecuadorian Andes, at altitudes between 2,000 and 3,000 meters.
