= Polypoetes nox =

Scientific classification
- Kingdom: Animalia
- Phylum: Arthropoda
- Class: Insecta
- Order: Lepidoptera
- Superfamily: Noctuoidea
- Family: Notodontidae
- Genus: Polypoetes
- Species: P. nox

Binomial name
- Polypoetes nox H. Druce, 1909

Species of moth

Polypoetes nox is a moth of the family Notodontidae first described by Herbert Druce in 1909. It is found in Colombia and Venezuela.
