= Polypoetes suffumosa =

Scientific classification
- Kingdom: Animalia
- Phylum: Arthropoda
- Class: Insecta
- Order: Lepidoptera
- Superfamily: Noctuoidea
- Family: Notodontidae
- Genus: Polypoetes
- Species: P. suffumosa

Binomial name
- Polypoetes suffumosa Dognin, 1902

Species of moth

Polypoetes suffumosa is a moth of the family Notodontidae. It is found in Argentina.

It is one of the smallest species in the genus Polypoetes with a forewing length of 9–12 mm.
