= Tarache knowltoni =

Scientific classification
- Kingdom: Animalia
- Phylum: Arthropoda
- Clade: Pancrustacea
- Class: Insecta
- Order: Lepidoptera
- Superfamily: Noctuoidea
- Family: Noctuidae
- Tribe: Acontiini
- Genus: Tarache
- Species: T. knowltoni

Binomial name
- Tarache knowltoni (McDunnough, 1940)

Species of moth

Tarache knowltoni is a species of bird dropping moth in the family Noctuidae.

The MONA or Hodges number for Tarache knowltoni is 9139.
