= Tarache cora =

Scientific classification
- Kingdom: Animalia
- Phylum: Arthropoda
- Clade: Pancrustacea
- Class: Insecta
- Order: Lepidoptera
- Superfamily: Noctuoidea
- Family: Noctuidae
- Genus: Tarache
- Species: T. cora

Binomial name
- Tarache cora Barnes & McDunnough, 1918

Species of moth

Tarache cora is a species of bird-dropping moth in the family Noctuidae. It was first described by William Barnes and James Halliday McDunnough in 1918 and it is found in North America.

The MONA or Hodges number for Tarache cora is 9151.
