= Polypoetes approximans =

Scientific classification
- Kingdom: Animalia
- Phylum: Arthropoda
- Class: Insecta
- Order: Lepidoptera
- Superfamily: Noctuoidea
- Family: Notodontidae
- Genus: Polypoetes
- Species: P. approximans

Binomial name
- Polypoetes approximans (Warren, 1901)

Synonyms
- Tithraustes approximans Warren, 1901

Species of moth

Polypoetes approximans is a moth of the family Notodontidae. It is found from Panama north to Costa Rica.

The larvae feed on Pachira aquatica. They show prominent blackish dorsal spots.
