= Polypoetes ineldo =

Scientific classification
- Kingdom: Animalia
- Phylum: Arthropoda
- Class: Insecta
- Order: Lepidoptera
- Superfamily: Noctuoidea
- Family: Notodontidae
- Genus: Polypoetes
- Species: P. ineldo

Binomial name
- Polypoetes ineldo Schaus, 1933

Species of moth

Polypoetes ineldo is a moth of the family Notodontidae. It is found in Colombia and Ecuador.
