= Tarache abdominalis =

Scientific classification
- Kingdom: Animalia
- Phylum: Arthropoda
- Clade: Pancrustacea
- Class: Insecta
- Order: Lepidoptera
- Superfamily: Noctuoidea
- Family: Noctuidae
- Genus: Tarache
- Species: T. abdominalis

Binomial name
- Tarache abdominalis Grote, 1877

Species of moth

Tarache abdominalis is a species of bird dropping moth in the family Noctuidae. It is found in North America.

The MONA or Hodges number for Tarache abdominalis is 9138.
