= Tarache terminimaculata =

Scientific classification
- Kingdom: Animalia
- Phylum: Arthropoda
- Clade: Pancrustacea
- Class: Insecta
- Order: Lepidoptera
- Superfamily: Noctuoidea
- Family: Noctuidae
- Genus: Tarache
- Species: T. terminimaculata

Binomial name
- Tarache terminimaculata Grote, 1873

Species of moth

Tarache terminimaculata, the curve-lined bird-dropping moth, is a species of moth in the family Noctuidae (owlet moths). The species was described by Augustus Radcliffe Grote in 1873. It is found in North America.

The MONA or Hodges number for Tarache terminimaculata is 9145.
