= Polypoetes eriphus =

Scientific classification
- Kingdom: Animalia
- Phylum: Arthropoda
- Class: Insecta
- Order: Lepidoptera
- Superfamily: Noctuoidea
- Family: Notodontidae
- Genus: Polypoetes
- Species: P. eriphus

Binomial name
- Polypoetes eriphus H. Druce, 1885

Synonyms
- Polypoetes cethegus Schaus, 1889; Polypoetes draudti Hering, 1925

Species of moth

Polypoetes eriphus is a moth of the family Notodontidae first described by Herbert Druce in 1885. It is found in Mexico, Guatemala and Nicaragua.
