= Polypoetes colana =

Scientific classification
- Kingdom: Animalia
- Phylum: Arthropoda
- Class: Insecta
- Order: Lepidoptera
- Superfamily: Noctuoidea
- Family: Notodontidae
- Genus: Polypoetes
- Species: P. colana

Binomial name
- Polypoetes colana H. Druce, 1893

Synonyms
- Polypoetes evanescens Hering, 1925

Species of moth

Polypoetes colana is a moth of the family Notodontidae first described by Herbert Druce in 1893. It is found in southern Peru and northern Bolivia, on the eastern slope of the Andes.
