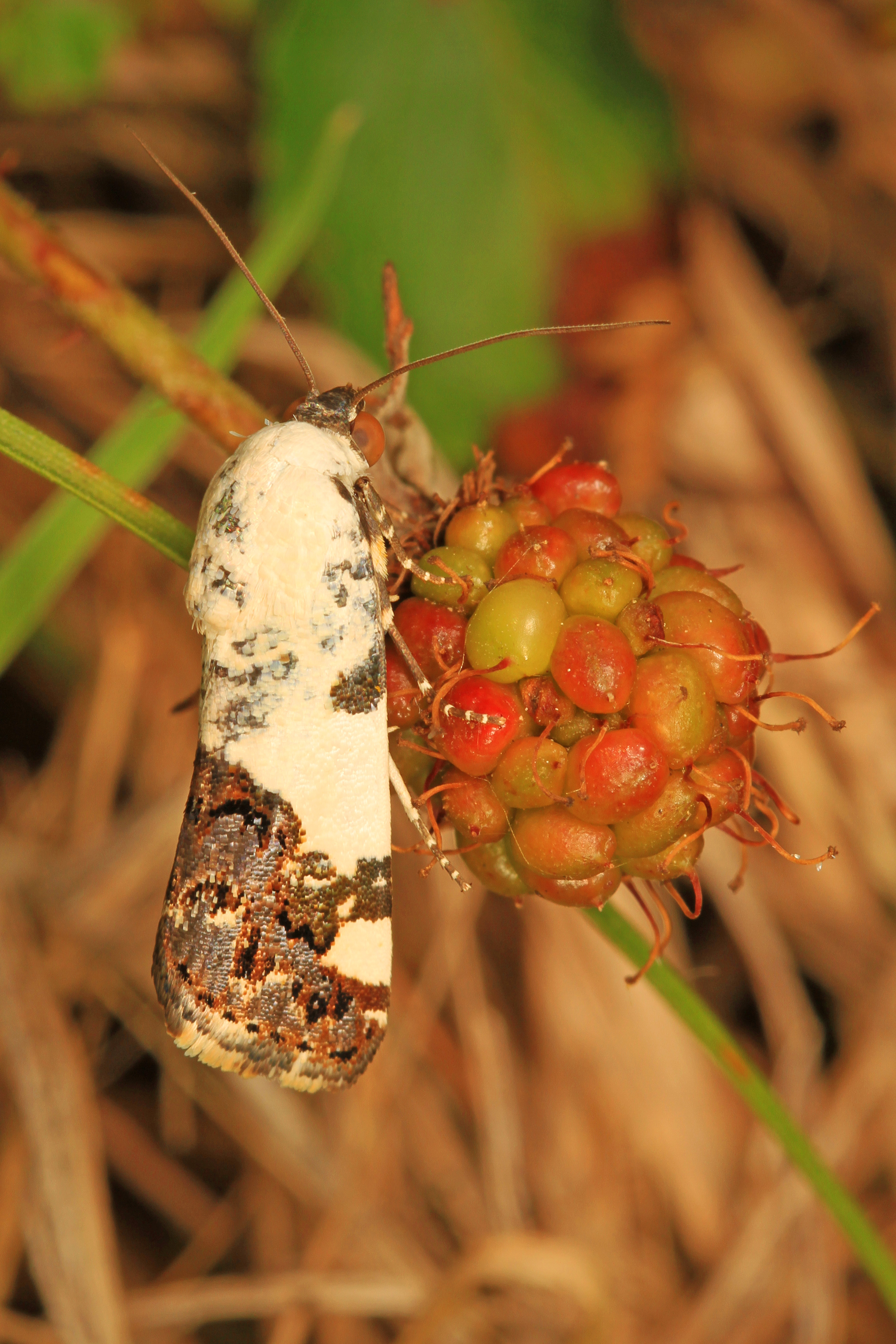

Scientific classification
- Kingdom: Animalia
- Phylum: Arthropoda
- Clade: Pancrustacea
- Class: Insecta
- Order: Lepidoptera
- Superfamily: Noctuoidea
- Family: Noctuidae
- Tribe: Acontiini
- Genus: Tarache
- Species: T. quadriplaga

Binomial name
- Tarache quadriplaga (Smith, 1900)

Synonyms
- Tarache alessandra (Smith, 1903)

= Tarache quadriplaga =

Species of moth

Tarache quadriplaga is a species of bird dropping moth in the family Noctuidae first described by Smith in 1900. It is found in North America.
