= Polypoetes marginifer =

Scientific classification
- Kingdom: Animalia
- Phylum: Arthropoda
- Class: Insecta
- Order: Lepidoptera
- Superfamily: Noctuoidea
- Family: Notodontidae
- Genus: Polypoetes
- Species: P. marginifer

Binomial name
- Polypoetes marginifer Dyar, 1913

Species of moth

Polypoetes marginifer is a moth of the family Notodontidae. It is found in Peru.
