= Polypoetes disconnexa =

Scientific classification
- Kingdom: Animalia
- Phylum: Arthropoda
- Class: Insecta
- Order: Lepidoptera
- Superfamily: Noctuoidea
- Family: Notodontidae
- Genus: Polypoetes
- Species: P. disconnexa

Binomial name
- Polypoetes disconnexa Dognin, 1911

Synonyms
- Tanaostyla disconnexa Dognin, 1911

Species of moth

Polypoetes disconnexa is a moth of the family Notodontidae. It is found in Colombia.
