= Polypoetes leuschneri =

Scientific classification
- Kingdom: Animalia
- Phylum: Arthropoda
- Class: Insecta
- Order: Lepidoptera
- Superfamily: Noctuoidea
- Family: Notodontidae
- Genus: Polypoetes
- Species: P. leuschneri

Binomial name
- Polypoetes leuschneri Miller, 2009

Species of moth

Polypoetes leuschneri is a moth of the family Notodontidae first described by James S. Miller in 2008. It is endemic to the Pacific slope of the Ecuadorian Andes.

The length of the forewings is 13–14.5 mm for males and 13.5–15 mm for females.
