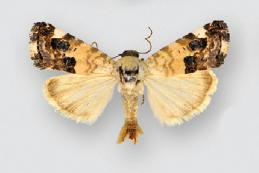
- Male
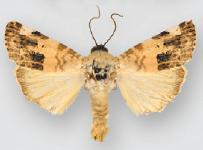
- Female

Scientific classification
- Kingdom: Animalia
- Phylum: Arthropoda
- Clade: Pancrustacea
- Class: Insecta
- Order: Lepidoptera
- Superfamily: Noctuoidea
- Family: Noctuidae
- Genus: Tarache
- Species: T. albifusa

Binomial name
- Tarache albifusa Ferris & Lafontaine, 2009

Synonyms
- Acontia albifusa Ferris & Lafontaine, 2009

= Tarache albifusa =

Species of moth

Tarache albifusa is a moth of the family Noctuidae first described by Clifford D. Ferris and J. Donald Lafontaine in 2009. It is found in the US state of Arizona.

The length of the forewings is 9.5–11 mm for males and about 10.5 mm for females. Adults are on wing from June to September.
