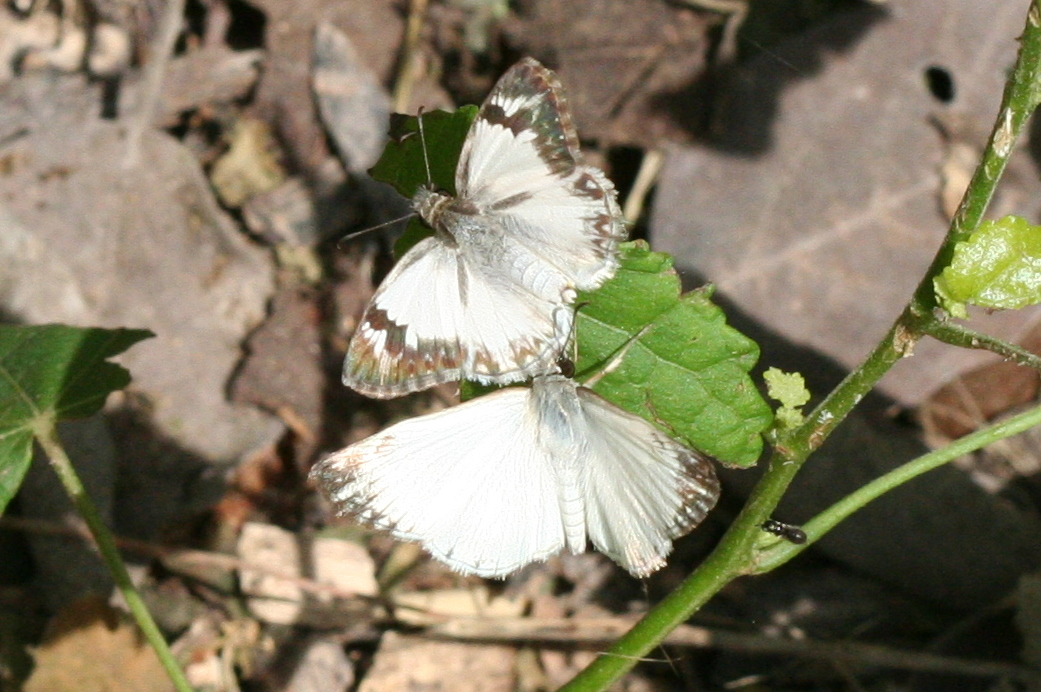

Scientific classification
- Kingdom: Animalia
- Phylum: Arthropoda
- Clade: Pancrustacea
- Class: Insecta
- Order: Lepidoptera
- Family: Hesperiidae
- Genus: Heliopetes
- Species: H. macaira

Binomial name
- Heliopetes macaira (Reakirt, [1867])

Synonyms
- Pyrgus macaira Reakirt, [1867]; Hesperia macaria; Leucoscirtes nivea Scudder, 1872 (preocc. Cramer, 1775); Leucochitonea locutia Hewitson, 1875; Leucochitonea eulalia Plötz, 1885; Heliopetes cnemus Godman & Salvin, [1897]; Heliopetes locutia; Leucochitonea orbigera Mabille, 1888; Heliopetes macaroides Williams & Bell, 1940

= Heliopetes macaira =

Species of butterfly

Heliopetes macaira, the Turk's-cap white-skipper , is a butterfly of the family Hesperiidae. It is found from southern Texas in North America, south through Central America to Paraguay.

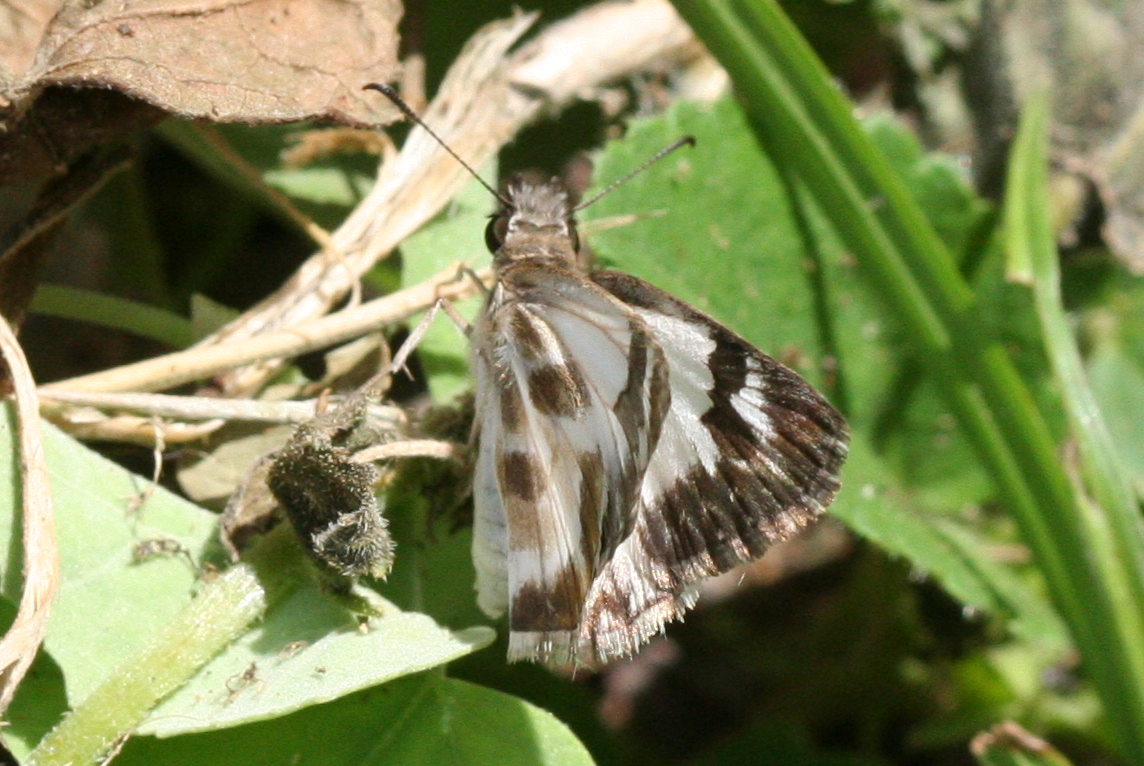

The wingspan is 32–35 mm. There are several generations with adults on wing from April to November in southern Texas.

The larvae feed on Malvaviscus drummondii. Adults feed on flower nectar.

== Subspecies ==
- Heliopetes macaira macaira (Arizona, Mexico, Guatemala, Panama, Venezuela)
- Heliopetes macaira orbigera (Brazil, Bolivia)
