= Polypoetes corneola =

Scientific classification
- Kingdom: Animalia
- Phylum: Arthropoda
- Class: Insecta
- Order: Lepidoptera
- Superfamily: Noctuoidea
- Family: Notodontidae
- Genus: Polypoetes
- Species: P. corneola

Binomial name
- Polypoetes corneola Miller, 2008

Species of moth

Polypoetes corneola is a moth of the family Notodontidae. It is found in south-eastern Peru.

The length of the forewings is 15 mm for males and 15.5 mm for females.
