= Tarache lagunae =

Scientific classification
- Kingdom: Animalia
- Phylum: Arthropoda
- Clade: Pancrustacea
- Class: Insecta
- Order: Lepidoptera
- Superfamily: Noctuoidea
- Family: Noctuidae
- Tribe: Acontiini
- Genus: Tarache
- Species: T. lagunae

Binomial name
- Tarache lagunae (Mustelin & Leuschner, 2000)

Species of moth

Tarache lagunae is a species of bird dropping moth in the family Noctuidae. It is found in North America.

The MONA or Hodges number for Tarache lagunae is 9140.1.
