= Polypoetes circumfumata =

Scientific classification
- Kingdom: Animalia
- Phylum: Arthropoda
- Class: Insecta
- Order: Lepidoptera
- Superfamily: Noctuoidea
- Family: Notodontidae
- Genus: Polypoetes
- Species: P. circumfumata

Binomial name
- Polypoetes circumfumata (Warren, 1901)

Synonyms
- Phaeochlaena circumfumata Warren, 1901

Species of moth

Polypoetes circumfumata is a moth of the family Notodontidae. It is found in Venezuela.

The larvae feed on Paullinia macrophylla.
