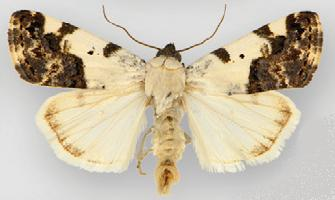
- Male
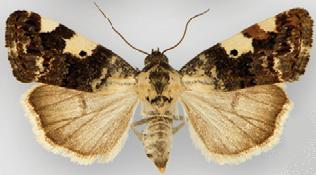
- Female

Scientific classification
- Kingdom: Animalia
- Phylum: Arthropoda
- Clade: Pancrustacea
- Class: Insecta
- Order: Lepidoptera
- Superfamily: Noctuoidea
- Family: Noctuidae
- Genus: Tarache
- Species: T. aprica

Binomial name
- Tarache aprica (Hübner, [1808])

Synonyms
- Acontia aprica (Hübner, [1808]); Noctua aprica Hübner, [1808]; Noctua alboater Haworth, 1809; Noctua albo-ater Haworth, 1809; Acontia unocula Freyer, 1849; Acontia biplaga Guenée, 1852; Acontia redita Felder & Rogenhofer, 1874; Acontia apricana (Strand, 1916); Acontia apricanoides (Strand, 1916); Acontia apricella (Strand, 1916)

= Tarache aprica =

Species of moth

Tarache aprica, the exposed bird dropping moth, is a moth of the family Noctuidae. The species was first described by Jacob Hübner in 1808. It is found in North America from Ontario and Quebec to Florida, west to Arizona, north to Kansas and Iowa. There are some records from Great Britain, but this probably relates to imports.

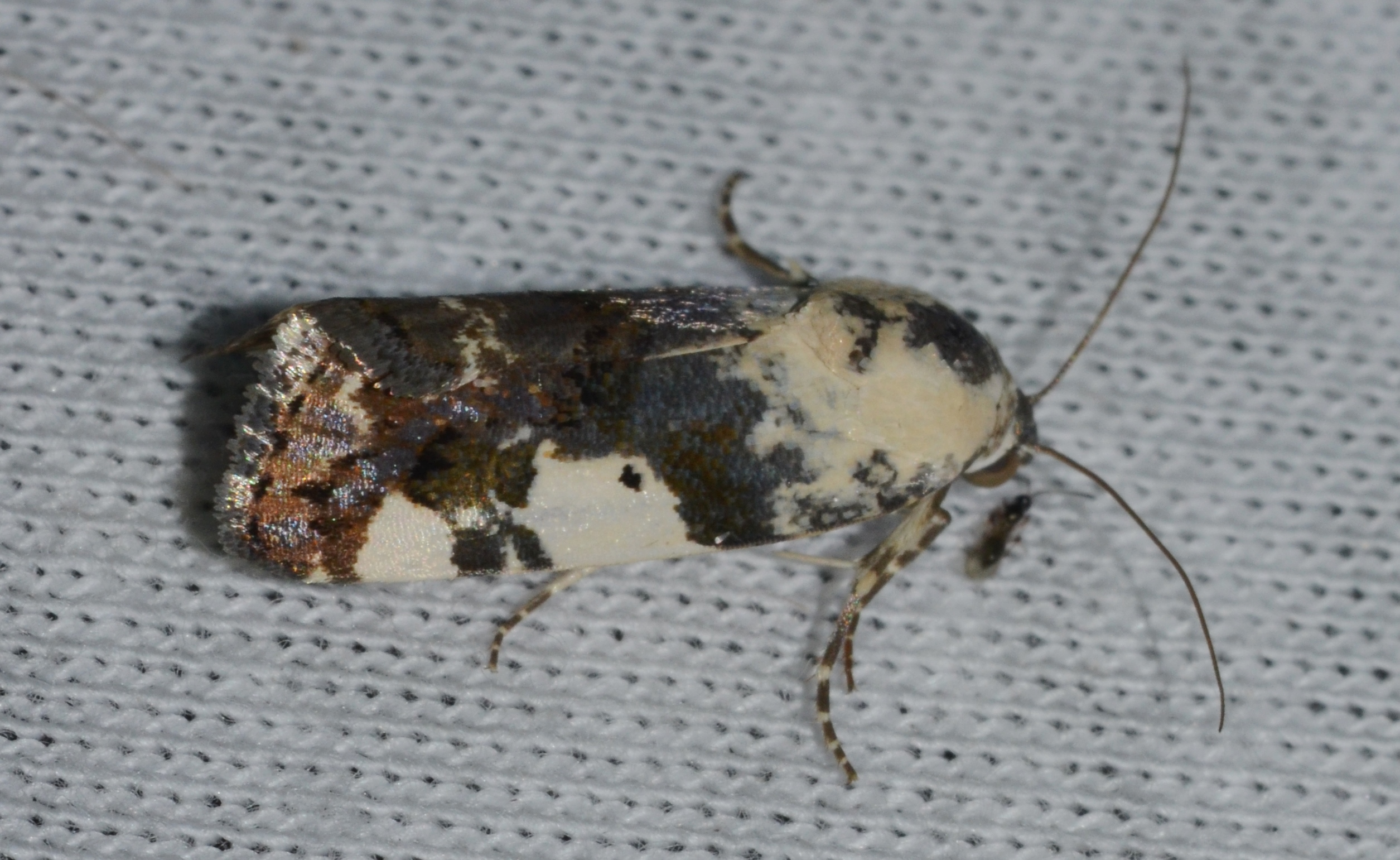

The habitat consists of gardens, fields and open areas. The wingspan is 15–29 mm. Adults are on wing from March to September in the south. They have a reduced season in the north.

The larvae feed on Alcea rosea.
