= Polypoetes oteroi =

Scientific classification
- Kingdom: Animalia
- Phylum: Arthropoda
- Class: Insecta
- Order: Lepidoptera
- Superfamily: Noctuoidea
- Family: Notodontidae
- Genus: Polypoetes
- Species: P. oteroi

Binomial name
- Polypoetes oteroi Miller, 2008

Species of moth

Polypoetes oteroi is a moth of the family Notodontidae. It is found in Venezuela.

The length of the forewings is 15–18 mm for males.
