= Polypoetes tinalandia =

Scientific classification
- Kingdom: Animalia
- Phylum: Arthropoda
- Class: Insecta
- Order: Lepidoptera
- Superfamily: Noctuoidea
- Family: Notodontidae
- Genus: Polypoetes
- Species: P. tinalandia

Binomial name
- Polypoetes tinalandia Miller, 2008

Species of moth

Polypoetes tinalandia is a moth of the family Notodontidae. It is found along the Pacific slope of the Ecuadorian Andes.

The length of the forewings is 14-14.5 mm for males and 14.5–15 mm for females.

== Etymology ==
The name of this species refers to the type locality, Tinalandia, Ecuador.
