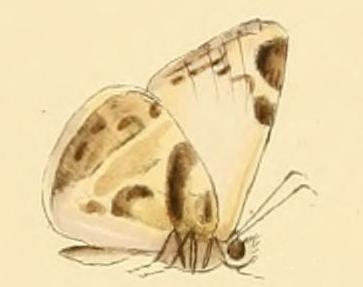

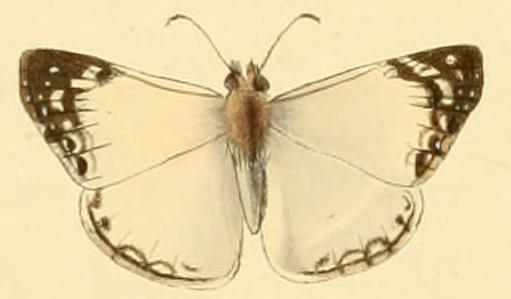

Scientific classification
- Kingdom: Animalia
- Phylum: Arthropoda
- Clade: Pancrustacea
- Class: Insecta
- Order: Lepidoptera
- Family: Hesperiidae
- Genus: Heliopetes
- Species: H. laviana

Binomial name
- Heliopetes laviana (Hewitson, 1868)

Synonyms
- Leucochitonea laviana Hewitson, 1868; Leucochitonea pastor R. Felder, 1869; Syrichtus oceanus Edwards, 1871; Heliopetes dividua Röber, 1925; Pyrgus leca Butler, 1870

= Heliopetes laviana =

Species of butterfly

Heliopetes laviana, the Laviana white-skipper or Laviana skipper, is a butterfly in the family Hesperiidae. It is found from Argentina through Central America and northern Mexico to southern Texas. Strays can be found in southern Arizona and central and northern Texas. The habitat consists of edges of brushy areas, trails, roadsides, open woodland, thorn forest and streamsides.

The wingspan is 35–42 mm. There are multiple generations per year in southern Texas. Adults feed on flower nectar.

The larvae feed on the leaves of various mallows, including Sphaeralcea, Sida and Abutilon species. They live in a nest of folded leaves.

== Subspecies ==
- Heliopetes laviana laviana (Texas, Arizona, Mexico, Nicaragua, Colombia)
- Heliopetes laviana leca (Butler, 1870) (Venezuela)
