= Tarache flavipennis =

Scientific classification
- Kingdom: Animalia
- Phylum: Arthropoda
- Clade: Pancrustacea
- Class: Insecta
- Order: Lepidoptera
- Superfamily: Noctuoidea
- Family: Noctuidae
- Genus: Tarache
- Species: T. flavipennis

Binomial name
- Tarache flavipennis Grote, 1873

Species of moth

Tarache flavipennis is a species of bird dropping moth in the family Noctuidae. It is found in North America.

The MONA or Hodges number for Tarache flavipennis is 9140.
