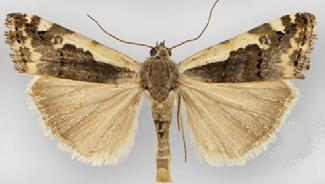

Scientific classification
- Kingdom: Animalia
- Phylum: Arthropoda
- Clade: Pancrustacea
- Class: Insecta
- Order: Lepidoptera
- Superfamily: Noctuoidea
- Family: Noctuidae
- Genus: Tarache
- Species: T. augustipennis

Binomial name
- Tarache augustipennis Grote, 1875

Synonyms
- Therasea augustipennis (Grote, 1875); Therasea flavicosta Smith, 1900

= Tarache augustipennis =

Narrow-winged midget

Species of moth

Tarache augustipennis, the narrow-winged midget, is a moth of the family Noctuidae. The species was first described by Augustus Radcliffe Grote in 1875. It is found in North America from Manitoba to south-western British Columbia, south to Arizona and east to Texas.

The habitat consists of fens, bogs, foothill valleys and riparian woodlands in arid grasslands.

The wingspan is 23–30 mm. Adults are on from May to August in the north.
