= Tarache sedata =

Scientific classification
- Kingdom: Animalia
- Phylum: Arthropoda
- Clade: Pancrustacea
- Class: Insecta
- Order: Lepidoptera
- Superfamily: Noctuoidea
- Family: Noctuidae
- Tribe: Acontiini
- Genus: Tarache
- Species: T. sedata

Binomial name
- Tarache sedata H. Edwards, 1881

Species of moth

Tarache sedata is a species of bird-dropping moth in the family Noctuidae, found in North America.

The MONA or Hodges number for Tarache sedata is 9154.
