= Polypoetes picaria =

Scientific classification
- Kingdom: Animalia
- Phylum: Arthropoda
- Class: Insecta
- Order: Lepidoptera
- Superfamily: Noctuoidea
- Family: Notodontidae
- Genus: Polypoetes
- Species: P. picaria

Binomial name
- Polypoetes picaria Warren, 1904

Synonyms
- Astyochia punctata Druce; Polypoetes cryptophleps Hering, 1925

Species of moth

Polypoetes picaria is a moth of the family Notodontidae. It is endemic to eastern Peru and northern Bolivia at an altitude of approximately 3,000 meters.
