= Polypoetes wagneri =

Scientific classification
- Kingdom: Animalia
- Phylum: Arthropoda
- Clade: Pancrustacea
- Class: Insecta
- Order: Lepidoptera
- Superfamily: Noctuoidea
- Family: Notodontidae
- Genus: Polypoetes
- Species: P. wagneri

Binomial name
- Polypoetes wagneri Miller, 2008

Species of moth

Polypoetes wagneri is a moth of the family Notodontidae first described by James S. Miller in 2008. It is found in Costa Rica.

The length of the forewings is 13.5-15.5 mm for males and 15.5–16 mm for females.
