= Polypoetes fuliginosa =

Scientific classification
- Kingdom: Animalia
- Phylum: Arthropoda
- Class: Insecta
- Order: Lepidoptera
- Superfamily: Noctuoidea
- Family: Notodontidae
- Genus: Polypoetes
- Species: P. fuliginosa

Binomial name
- Polypoetes fuliginosa Dognin, 1904

Species of moth

Polypoetes fuliginosa is a moth of the family Notodontidae. It is found in Bolivia and Peru.
