= Polypoetes exclusa =

Scientific classification
- Kingdom: Animalia
- Phylum: Arthropoda
- Class: Insecta
- Order: Lepidoptera
- Superfamily: Noctuoidea
- Family: Notodontidae
- Genus: Polypoetes
- Species: P. exclusa

Binomial name
- Polypoetes exclusa Hering, 1925

Species of moth

Polypoetes exclusa is a moth of the family Notodontidae. It is found in Colombia.
