= Polypoetes obtusa =

Scientific classification
- Kingdom: Animalia
- Phylum: Arthropoda
- Class: Insecta
- Order: Lepidoptera
- Superfamily: Noctuoidea
- Family: Notodontidae
- Genus: Polypoetes
- Species: P. obtusa

Binomial name
- Polypoetes obtusa (Walker, 1856)

Synonyms
- Arina obtusa Walker, 1856

Species of moth

Polypoetes obtusa is a moth of the family Notodontidae. It is found in Brazil.
