= Tarache major =

Scientific classification
- Kingdom: Animalia
- Phylum: Arthropoda
- Clade: Pancrustacea
- Class: Insecta
- Order: Lepidoptera
- Superfamily: Noctuoidea
- Family: Noctuidae
- Tribe: Acontiini
- Genus: Tarache
- Species: T. major

Binomial name
- Tarache major (Smith, 1900)

Species of moth

Tarache major is a species of bird dropping moth in the family Noctuidae.

The MONA or Hodges number for Tarache major is 9152.
