= Tarache dacia =

Scientific classification
- Kingdom: Animalia
- Phylum: Arthropoda
- Clade: Pancrustacea
- Class: Insecta
- Order: Lepidoptera
- Superfamily: Noctuoidea
- Family: Noctuidae
- Tribe: Acontiini
- Genus: Tarache
- Species: T. dacia

Binomial name
- Tarache dacia (Druce, 1889)

Synonyms
- Acontia dacia Druce, 1889

Species of moth

Tarache dacia, the brown cotton leafworm, is a species of bird dropping moth in the family Noctuidae.

The MONA or Hodges number for Tarache dacia is 9144.
