= Polypoetes semicoerulea =

Scientific classification
- Kingdom: Animalia
- Phylum: Arthropoda
- Class: Insecta
- Order: Lepidoptera
- Superfamily: Noctuoidea
- Family: Notodontidae
- Genus: Polypoetes
- Species: P. semicoerulea

Binomial name
- Polypoetes semicoerulea Dognin, 1910

Species of moth

Polypoetes semicoerulea is a moth of the family Notodontidae. It is found in Colombia.

This species is unusual for the genus Polypoetes in exhibiting uniformly black wings.
