= Tarache tenuicula =

Scientific classification
- Kingdom: Animalia
- Phylum: Arthropoda
- Clade: Pancrustacea
- Class: Insecta
- Order: Lepidoptera
- Superfamily: Noctuoidea
- Family: Noctuidae
- Tribe: Acontiini
- Genus: Tarache
- Species: T. tenuicula

Binomial name
- Tarache tenuicula Morrison, 1875

Species of moth

Tarache tenuicula is a species of bird dropping moth in the family Noctuidae. It is found in North America.

The MONA or Hodges number for Tarache tenuicula is 9135.
