= Polypoetes nubilosa =

Scientific classification
- Kingdom: Animalia
- Phylum: Arthropoda
- Class: Insecta
- Order: Lepidoptera
- Superfamily: Noctuoidea
- Family: Notodontidae
- Genus: Polypoetes
- Species: P. nubilosa

Binomial name
- Polypoetes nubilosa (Warren, 1900)

Synonyms
- Phaeochlaena nubilosa Warren, 1900

Species of moth

Polypoetes nubilosa is a moth of the family Notodontidae. It is endemic to mid-elevations along the western slope of the Ecuadorian Andes.

The larvae feed on Ochroma pyramidale.
