= Polypoetes rubribasis =

Scientific classification
- Kingdom: Animalia
- Phylum: Arthropoda
- Class: Insecta
- Order: Lepidoptera
- Superfamily: Noctuoidea
- Family: Notodontidae
- Genus: Polypoetes
- Species: P. rubribasis

Binomial name
- Polypoetes rubribasis (Hering, 1925)

Synonyms
- Stenoplastis rubribasis Hering, 1925

Species of moth

Polypoetes rubribasis is a moth of the family Notodontidae. It is found along the eastern slope of the Andes from central Peru south to Argentina, at elevations between 1,500 and 2,500 meters.
