= Polypoetes villiodes =

Scientific classification
- Kingdom: Animalia
- Phylum: Arthropoda
- Clade: Pancrustacea
- Class: Insecta
- Order: Lepidoptera
- Superfamily: Noctuoidea
- Family: Notodontidae
- Genus: Polypoetes
- Species: P. villiodes

Binomial name
- Polypoetes villiodes (L. B. Prout, 1918)

Synonyms
- Xenomigia villiodes Prout, 1918

Species of moth

Polypoetes villiodes is a moth of the family Notodontidae. It is found in Colombia.

It is the largest species in the genus Polypoetes with a forewing length of 20.5–22 mm.
