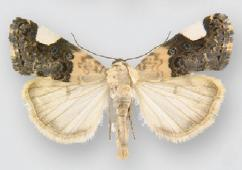
- Male
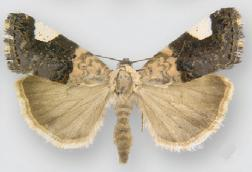
- Female

Scientific classification
- Kingdom: Animalia
- Phylum: Arthropoda
- Clade: Pancrustacea
- Class: Insecta
- Order: Lepidoptera
- Superfamily: Noctuoidea
- Family: Noctuidae
- Genus: Tarache
- Species: T. areloides

Binomial name
- Tarache areloides (Barnes & McDunnough, 1912)

Synonyms
- Acontia areloides Barnes & McDunnough, 1912

= Tarache areloides =

Species of moth

Tarache areloides is a moth of the family Noctuidae first described by William Barnes and James Halliday McDunnough in 1912. It is found in the US states of Arizona and New Mexico.

The length of the forewings is 12–14 mm for both males and females. Adults are on wing from July to September depending on the location.
