= Tarache huachuca =

Scientific classification
- Kingdom: Animalia
- Phylum: Arthropoda
- Clade: Pancrustacea
- Class: Insecta
- Order: Lepidoptera
- Superfamily: Noctuoidea
- Family: Noctuidae
- Tribe: Acontiini
- Genus: Tarache
- Species: T. huachuca

Binomial name
- Tarache huachuca (Smith, 1903)

Synonyms
- Tarache orba (Smith, 1903)

Species of moth

Tarache huachuca is a species of bird dropping moth in the family Noctuidae.

The MONA or Hodges number for Tarache huachuca is 9113.
