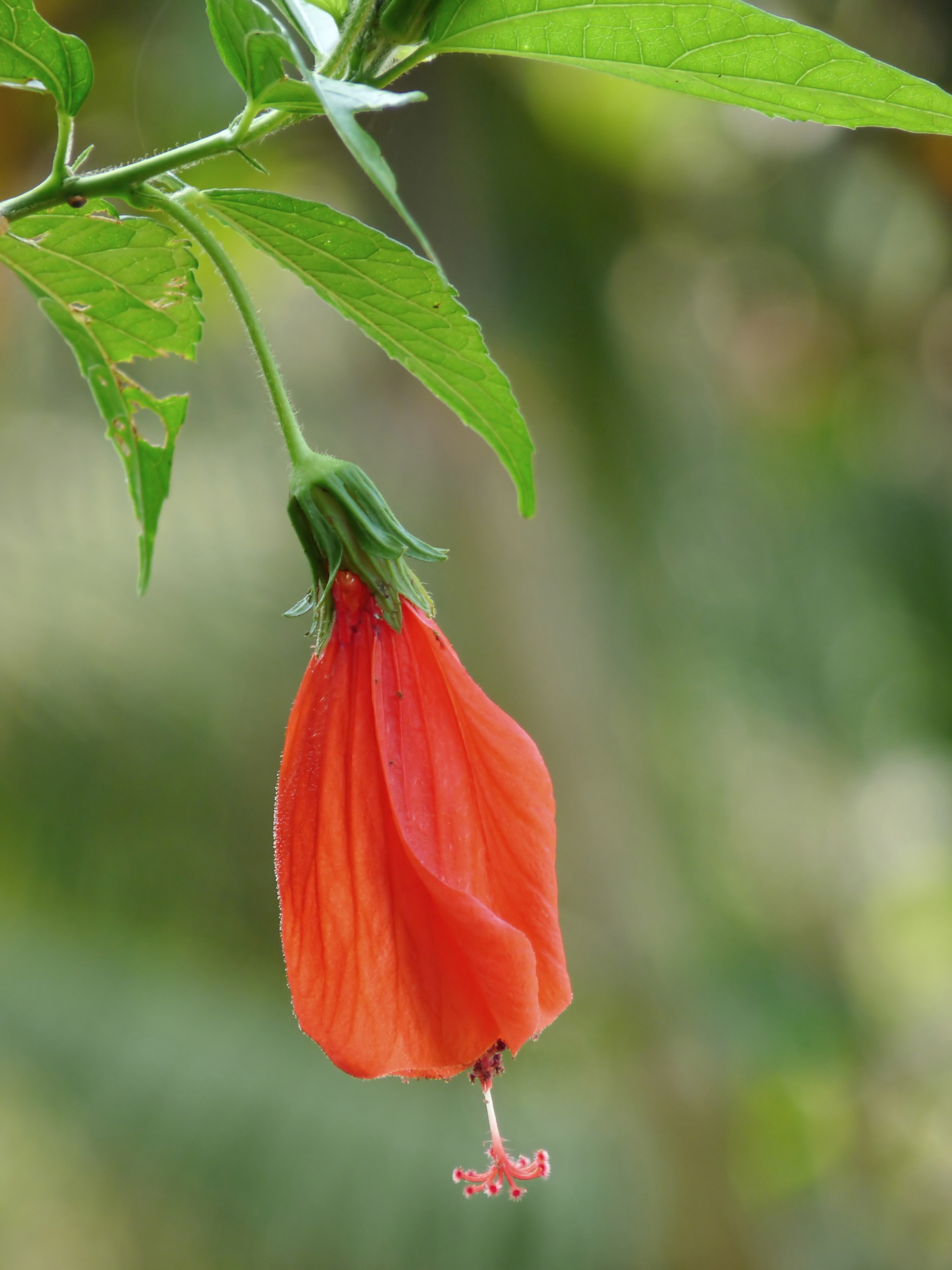
- Malvaviscus penduliflorus

Scientific classification
- Kingdom: Plantae
- Clade: Tracheophytes
- Clade: Angiosperms
- Clade: Eudicots
- Clade: Rosids
- Order: Malvales
- Family: Malvaceae
- Subfamily: Malvoideae
- Tribe: Hibisceae
- Genus: Malvaviscus; Fabr.

Type species
- Malvaviscus arboreus Cav.

Species
- See text

Synonyms
- Achania Sw.

= Malvaviscus =

Genus of flowering plants

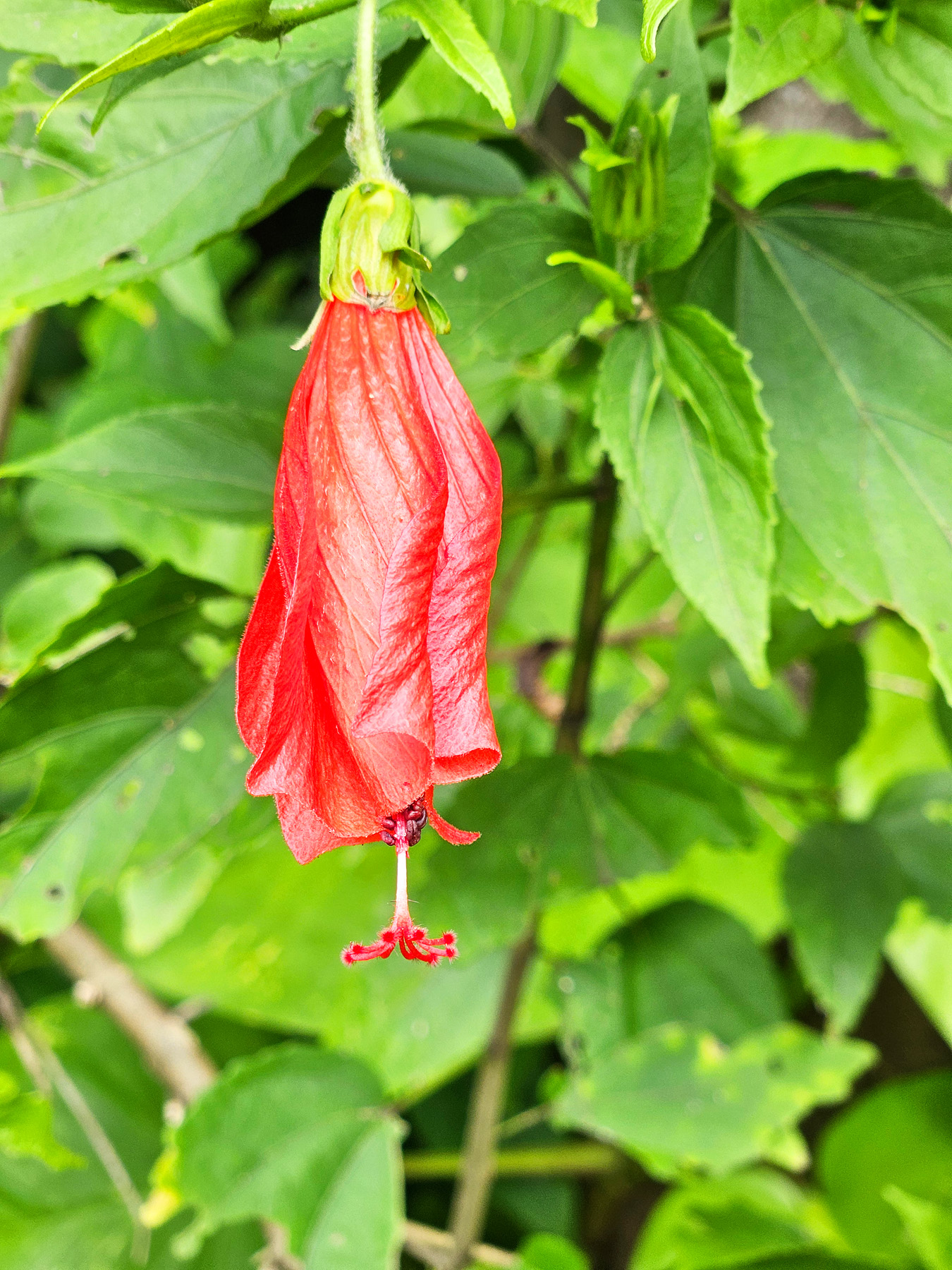
Malvaviscus (Maui)

Malvaviscus is a genus of flowering plants in the mallow family, Malvaceae. Common names for species in this genus include Turk's cap mallow, wax mallow, sleeping hibiscus, and mazapan. It belongs to a group of genera that differ from the closely related Hibiscus in possessing a fruit divided into 5 separate parts (a schizocarp), and having a style surmounted by 10, rather than 5, capitate or capitellate stigmas. Among those genera Malvaviscus is distinguished by having auriculate petals and red, fleshy fruits. The generic name is derived from the Latin words malva, meaning "mallow," and viscus, which means "sticky," referring to the mucilaginous sap produced by members of the genus. The fruit can be used to make jelly or syrup. Both the fruit and flowers are used to make herbal teas.

== Species ==
Ten species are accepted.

- Malvaviscus achanioides (Turcz.) Fryxell
- Malvaviscus arboreus Cav. – Southeastern United States, Mexico, Central and South America
  - Malvaviscus arboreus var. arboreus
  - Malvaviscus arboreus var. drummondii (Torr. & A.Gray) Schery (= Malvaviscus drummondii Torr. & A.Gray)
  - Malvaviscus arboreus var. mexicanus Schltdl.
- Malvaviscus concinnus Medik.
- Malvaviscus elegans Linden & Planch.
- Malvaviscus oaxacanus Standl.
- Malvaviscus palmanus Pittier & Donn.Sm. – Costa Rica
- Malvaviscus palmatus Ulbr.
- Malvaviscus penduliflorus DC. (synonym M. arboreus var. penduliflorus (DC.) Schery)
- Malvaviscus urticifolius (C.Presl) Fryxell
- Malvaviscus williamsii Ulbr.
