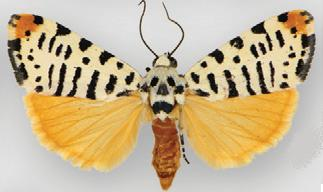

Scientific classification
- Kingdom: Animalia
- Phylum: Arthropoda
- Clade: Pancrustacea
- Class: Insecta
- Order: Lepidoptera
- Superfamily: Noctuoidea
- Family: Noctuidae
- Genus: Tarache
- Species: T. idella

Binomial name
- Tarache idella (Barnes, 1905)

Synonyms
- Cerathosia idella Barnes, 1905; Hemispragueia idella (Barnes, 1905)

= Tarache idella =

Species of moth

Tarache idella is a moth in the family Noctuidae, first described by William Barnes in 1905. It is found in Arizona and Texas.

The wingspan is 24–27 mm. Adults are on wing in September.

The forewings are orange-tinted yellow, marked with numerous vertical black lines and dashes. A distinct, bright orange spot is present at the apex. The hindwing are entirely suffused with orange.
