= Polypoetes augustimacula =

Scientific classification
- Kingdom: Animalia
- Phylum: Arthropoda
- Class: Insecta
- Order: Lepidoptera
- Superfamily: Noctuoidea
- Family: Notodontidae
- Genus: Polypoetes
- Species: P. augustimacula

Binomial name
- Polypoetes augustimacula (Dognin, 1902)

Synonyms
- Phaeochlaena augustimacula Dognin, 1902

Species of moth

Polypoetes augustimacula is a moth of the family Notodontidae. It is found in Colombia.

It is one of the largest species in the genus Polypoetes. The female type, the only known specimen, has a forewing length of 22 mm.
