= Polypoetes persimilis =

Scientific classification
- Kingdom: Animalia
- Phylum: Arthropoda
- Class: Insecta
- Order: Lepidoptera
- Superfamily: Noctuoidea
- Family: Notodontidae
- Genus: Polypoetes
- Species: P. persimilis

Binomial name
- Polypoetes persimilis (Dognin, 1913)

Synonyms
- Scotura persimilis Dognin, 1913

Species of moth

Polypoetes persimilis is a moth of the family Notodontidae. It is found in cloud forests on the eastern slope of the Andes in Colombia and Ecuador, at elevations between 2,000 and 3,200 meters.
