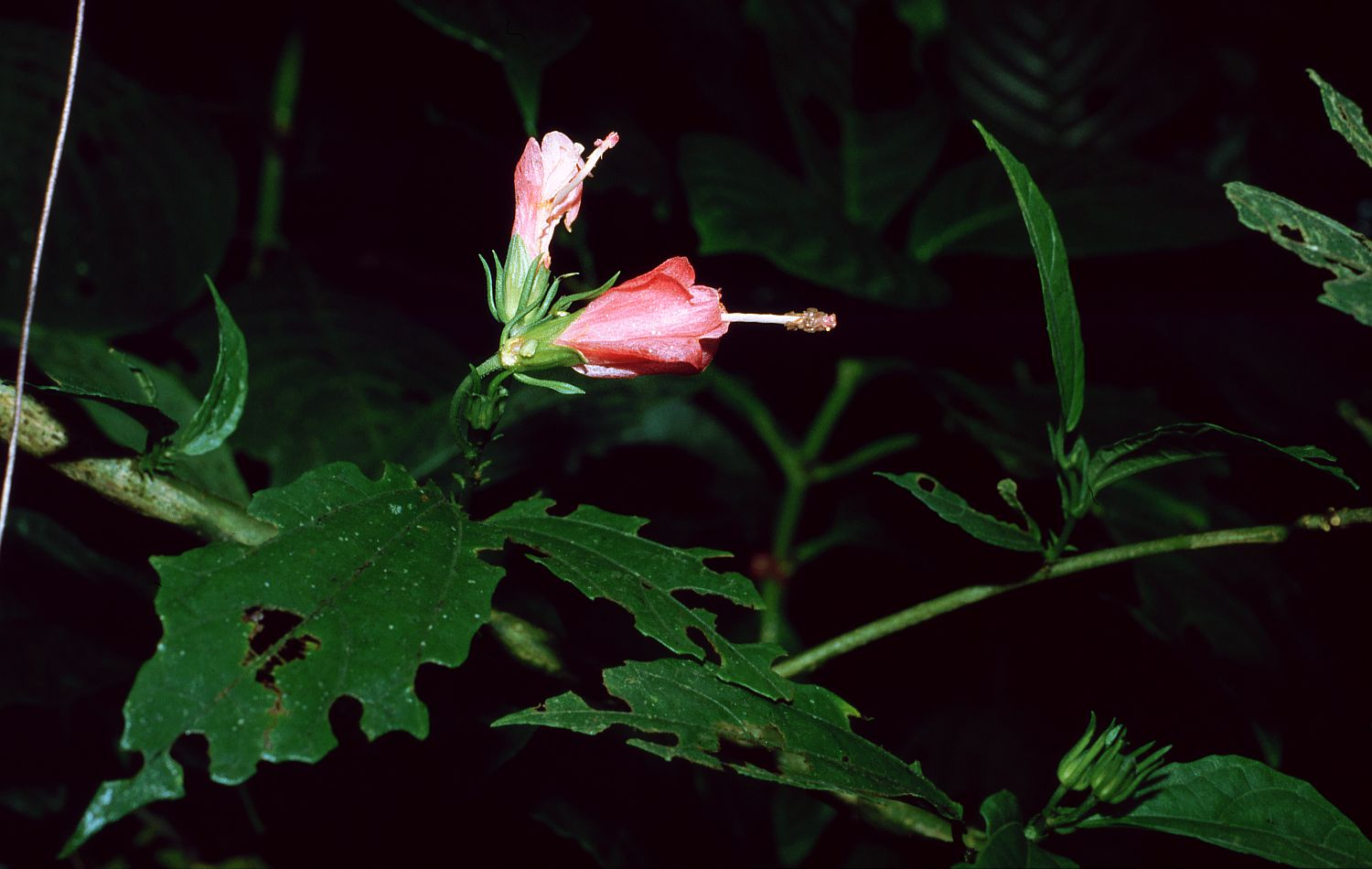

Scientific classification
- Kingdom: Plantae
- Clade: Tracheophytes
- Clade: Angiosperms
- Clade: Eudicots
- Clade: Rosids
- Order: Malvales
- Family: Malvaceae
- Genus: Malvaviscus
- Species: M. palmanus

Binomial name
- Malvaviscus palmanus Pittier & Donn.Sm., 1897

= Malvaviscus palmanus =

Species of tree

Malvaviscus palmanus is an understory tree of the Costa Rican cloud forest.

== Distribution ==
It is endemic to Costa Rica in the Talamancan montane forests ecoregion. It grows at elevations of 1,500–1,600 m (4,900–5,200 ft) above sea level.

== Description ==
Malvaviscus palmanus is 2–5 m (6.6–16.4 ft) in height. Like several other species in its genus, it has large red flowers, which are pollinated by hummingbirds.
