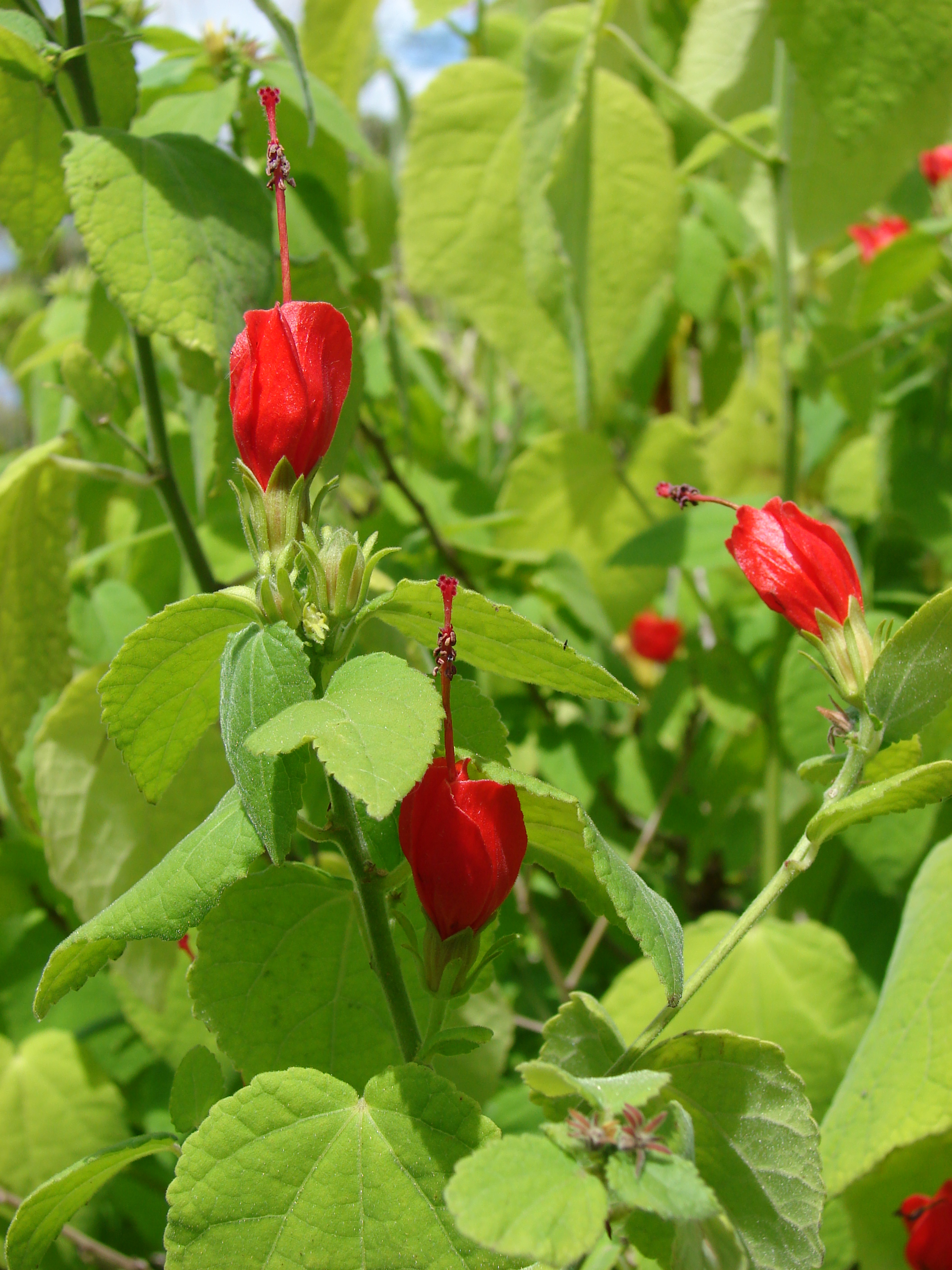

Conservation status
- Least Concern (IUCN 3.1)

Scientific classification
- Kingdom: Plantae
- Clade: Tracheophytes
- Clade: Angiosperms
- Clade: Eudicots
- Clade: Rosids
- Order: Malvales
- Family: Malvaceae
- Genus: Malvaviscus
- Species: M. arboreus

Binomial name
- Malvaviscus arboreus Cav.

Varieties
- See text

Synonyms
- Achania mollis Aiton

= Malvaviscus arboreus =

Species of flowering plant

Malvaviscus arboreus is a species of flowering plant in the hibiscus family, Malvaceae, that is native to the American South, Mexico, Central America, and South America. The specific name, arboreus, refers to the tree-like appearance of a mature plant. It is now popular in cultivation and goes by many English names including wax mallow, Turk's cap (mallow), Turk's turban, sleeping hibiscus, manzanilla, manzanita (de pollo), ladies teardrop and Scotchman's purse; many of these common names refer to other, in some cases unrelated, plants. Its flowers do not open fully and help attract butterflies and hummingbirds.

== Distribution ==
Malvaviscus arboreus is native to Central America, Mexico, and the Gulf Coast of the United States, particularly as an understory shrub in coastal Texas and Louisiana.

== Habitat and ecology ==
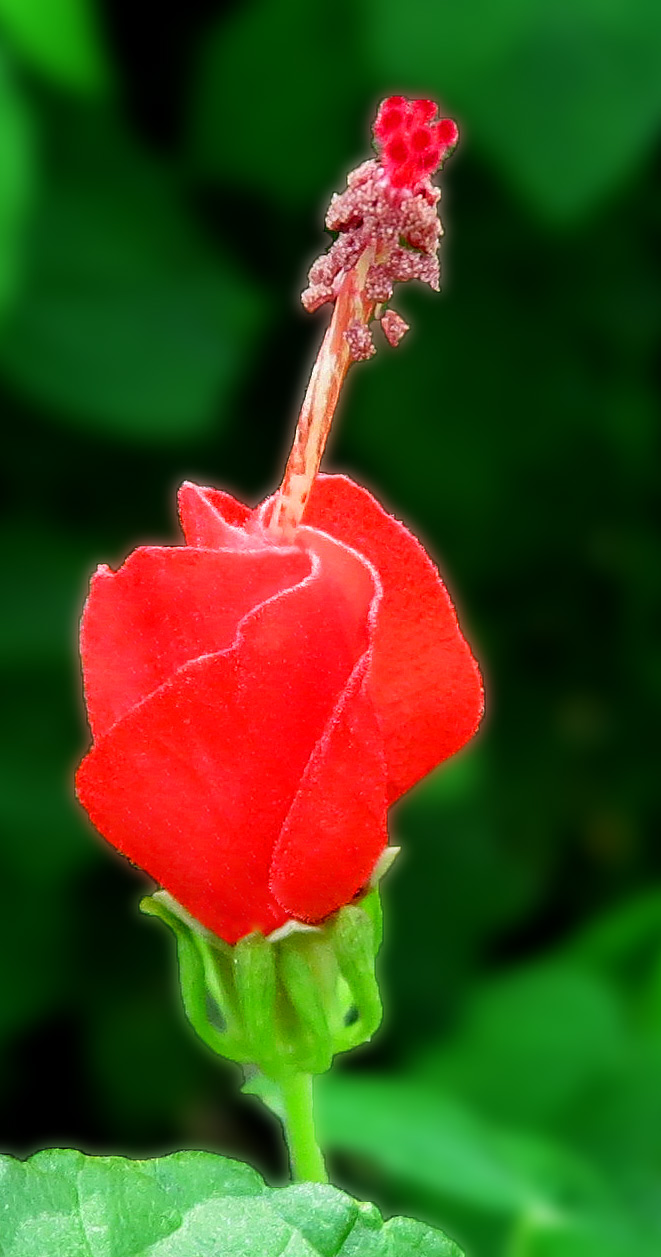
TurkCap or Scotchman's purse -- Malvaviscus arboreus is a flower native to Texas

Malvaviscus arboreus is a common understory shrub where it occurs in Texas and is an important food source for female and juvenile Ruby-throated Hummingbirds (Archilochus colubri) and Black-chinned Hummingbirds (A. alexandri). Each individual flower lasts two days but contains more nectar on the first day.

An example occurrence of M. arboreus is within the coastal Petenes mangroves of the Yucatán region of Mexico, in which plant community it is a subdominant species. M. arboreus is the primary host plant for the caterpillars of the Turk's-cap White-Skipper (Heliopetes macaira).

== Cultivation ==
Malvaviscus arboreus is commonly cultivated in shady to sunny sites in butterfly and hummingbird gardens across the southern United States. It can be propagated from fresh seeds or from softwood cuttings. It often blooms from May through November, but will bloom throughout a mild winter.

== Varieties ==
- Malvaviscus arboreus var. arboreus
- Malvaviscus arboreus var. drummondii (Torr. & A.Gray) Schery (= Malvaviscus drummondii Torr. & A.Gray)
- Malvaviscus arboreus var. mexicanus Schltdl.
