= Haimbachia arizonensis =

Scientific classification
- Kingdom: Animalia
- Phylum: Arthropoda
- Clade: Pancrustacea
- Class: Insecta
- Order: Lepidoptera
- Family: Crambidae
- Genus: Haimbachia
- Species: H. arizonensis

Binomial name
- Haimbachia arizonensis Capps, 1965

Species of moth

Haimbachia arizonensis is a moth in the family Crambidae. It was described by Hahn William Capps in 1965. It is found in North America, where it has been recorded from Arizona.

The length of the forewings is 7-7.5 mm. Adults have been recorded on wing in August.
