= Achyra piuralis =

Scientific classification
- Kingdom: Animalia
- Phylum: Arthropoda
- Clade: Pancrustacea
- Class: Insecta
- Order: Lepidoptera
- Family: Crambidae
- Genus: Achyra
- Species: A. piuralis

Binomial name
- Achyra piuralis (Capps, 1967)

Synonyms
- Loxostege piuralis Capps, 1967

Species of moth

Achyra piuralis is a moth in the family Crambidae. It was described by Hahn William Capps in 1967. It is found in Peru.
