= Hahncappsia cayugalis =

Scientific classification
- Domain: Eukaryota
- Kingdom: Animalia
- Phylum: Arthropoda
- Class: Insecta
- Order: Lepidoptera
- Family: Crambidae
- Genus: Hahncappsia
- Species: H. cayugalis

Binomial name
- Hahncappsia cayugalis (Capps, 1967)

Synonyms
- Loxostege cayugalis Capps, 1967

Species of moth

Hahncappsia cayugalis is a moth in the family Crambidae described by Hahn William Capps in 1967. It is found in Guatemala, Costa Rica and Mexico (San Luis Potosí, Morelos, Chiapas, Veracruz).

The wingspan is 21–25 mm for males and 26–28 mm for females. Adults have been recorded on wing from April to October.
