= Neohelvibotys arizonensis =

Scientific classification
- Domain: Eukaryota
- Kingdom: Animalia
- Phylum: Arthropoda
- Class: Insecta
- Order: Lepidoptera
- Family: Crambidae
- Genus: Neohelvibotys
- Species: N. arizonensis

Binomial name
- Neohelvibotys arizonensis (Capps, 1967)

Synonyms
- Loxostege arizonensis Capps, 1967

Species of moth

Neohelvibotys arizonensis is a moth in the family Crambidae described by Hahn William Capps in 1967. It is found in Mexico (Chiapas, Oaxaca, Mesquititlan, Guerrero, Puebla, Sonora) and United States, where it has been recorded from southern Arizona.

The wingspan is 20–24 mm. Adults have been recorded on wing from July to September in Arizona and from May to June in Mexico.
