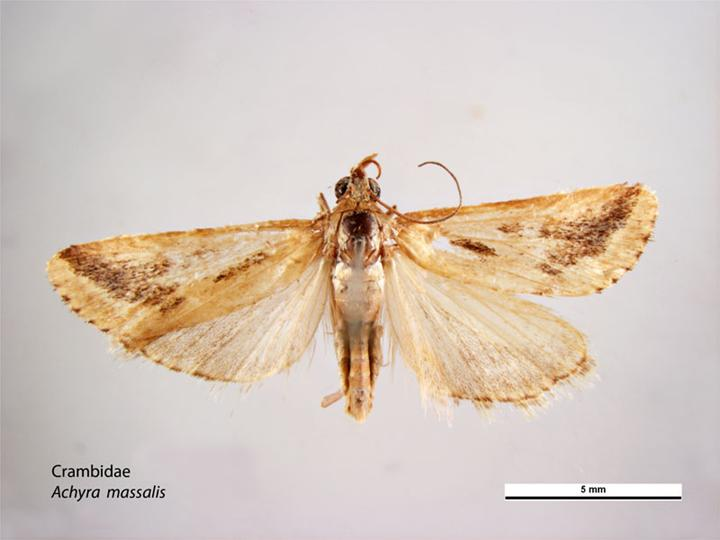
- Dorsal view
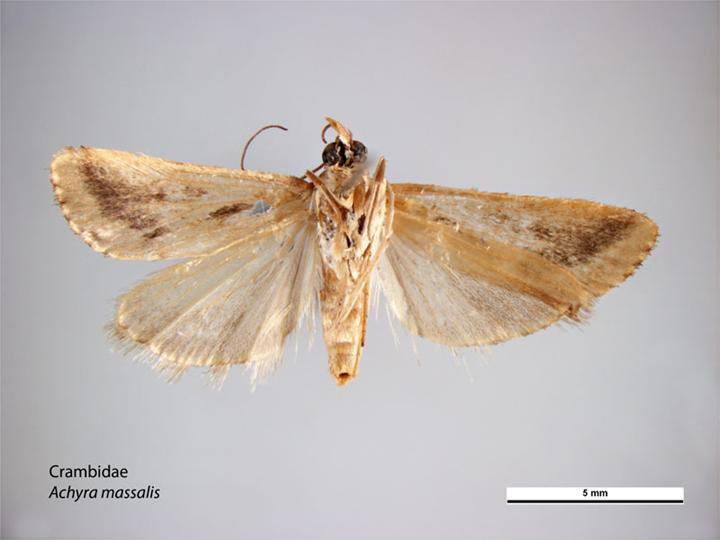
- Ventral view

Scientific classification
- Kingdom: Animalia
- Phylum: Arthropoda
- Clade: Pancrustacea
- Class: Insecta
- Order: Lepidoptera
- Family: Crambidae
- Genus: Achyra
- Species: A. massalis

Binomial name
- Achyra massalis (Walker, 1859)

Synonyms
- Scopula massalis Walker, 1859; Anerastia aurantiaca Rothschild, 1921; Loxostege fredi Amsel, 1961

= Achyra massalis =

Species of moth

Achyra massalis, the ombava, is a moth of the family Crambidae. The species was described by Francis Walker in 1859. It is found in most of the Old World tropics, including Réunion, Namibia and Australia (including New South Wales, Queensland and Western Australia).

The wingspan is about 20 millimetres (0.79 in).

== Taxonomy ==
It is sometimes listed as a synonym of Achyra coelatalis.
