= Haimbachia albescens =

Scientific classification
- Domain: Eukaryota
- Kingdom: Animalia
- Phylum: Arthropoda
- Class: Insecta
- Order: Lepidoptera
- Family: Crambidae
- Genus: Haimbachia
- Species: H. albescens

Binomial name
- Haimbachia albescens Capps, 1965

Species of moth

Haimbachia albescens, the silvered haimbachia moth, is a moth in the family Crambidae. It was described by Hahn William Capps in 1965. It is found in North America, where it has been recorded from Indiana, Iowa, Maryland, New Jersey, West Virginia, Illinois and southern Ontario.

The wingspan is 18 mm for males and 18–20 mm for females. The forewings are whitish with fine dusky scales. Adults are on wing in June and July.

The larvae feed on Panicum virgatum.
