= Haimbachia floridalis =

Scientific classification
- Kingdom: Animalia
- Phylum: Arthropoda
- Clade: Pancrustacea
- Class: Insecta
- Order: Lepidoptera
- Family: Crambidae
- Subfamily: Crambinae
- Tribe: Haimbachiini
- Genus: Haimbachia
- Species: H. floridalis

Binomial name
- Haimbachia floridalis Capps, 1965

Species of moth

Haimbachia floridalis is a moth in the family Crambidae. It was described by Hahn William Capps in 1965. It is found in North America, where it has been recorded from Florida.

The wingspan is about 18 mm. Adults are on wing from March to April.
