= Neohelvibotys saltensis =

Scientific classification
- Domain: Eukaryota
- Kingdom: Animalia
- Phylum: Arthropoda
- Class: Insecta
- Order: Lepidoptera
- Family: Crambidae
- Genus: Neohelvibotys
- Species: N. saltensis

Binomial name
- Neohelvibotys saltensis (Capps, 1967)

Synonyms
- Loxostege saltensis Capps, 1967

Species of moth

Neohelvibotys saltensis is a moth in the family Crambidae described by Hahn William Capps in 1967. It is found in Salta Province, Argentina.

The wingspan is about 23 mm.
