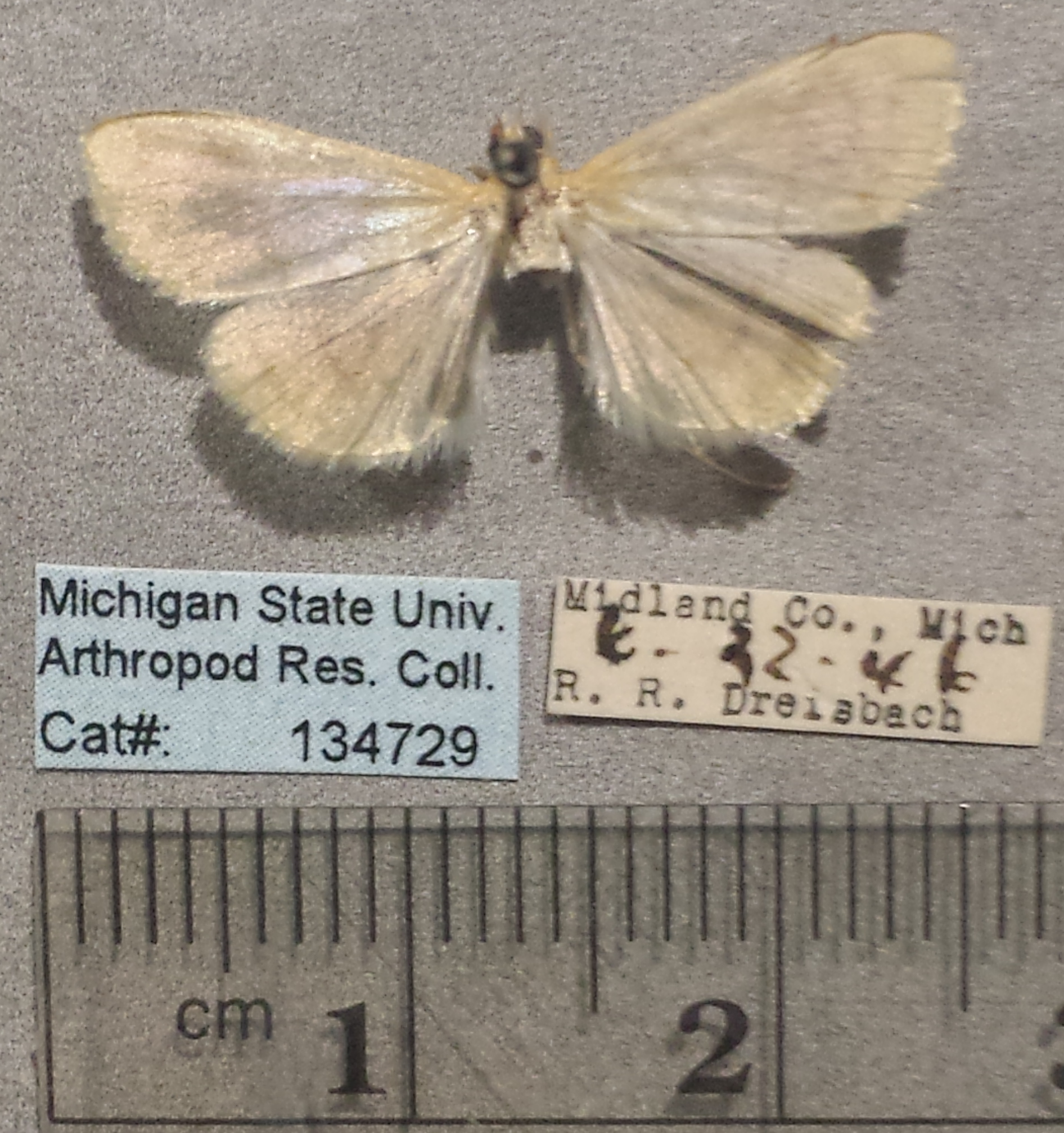

Scientific classification
- Domain: Eukaryota
- Kingdom: Animalia
- Phylum: Arthropoda
- Class: Insecta
- Order: Lepidoptera
- Family: Crambidae
- Genus: Hahncappsia
- Species: H. neobliteralis

Binomial name
- Hahncappsia neobliteralis (Capps, 1967)

Synonyms
- Loxostege neobliteralis Capps, 1967

= Hahncappsia neobliteralis =

Species of moth

Hahncappsia neobliteralis is a moth in the family Crambidae. It was described by Hahn William Capps in 1967. It is found in North America, where it has been recorded from Indiana, Iowa, Maryland, Mississippi, New Jersey, North Carolina, Ohio, Pennsylvania, Quebec, Tennessee, Washington, D.C., and West Virginia.

The wingspan is 18–24 mm for males and 22–23 mm for females. Adults have been recorded on wing from May to September.

The larvae feed on Ipomoea species.
