= Hahncappsia alpinensis =

Scientific classification
- Domain: Eukaryota
- Kingdom: Animalia
- Phylum: Arthropoda
- Class: Insecta
- Order: Lepidoptera
- Family: Crambidae
- Genus: Hahncappsia
- Species: H. alpinensis

Binomial name
- Hahncappsia alpinensis (Capps, 1967)

Synonyms
- Loxostege alpinensis Capps, 1967

Species of moth

Hahncappsia alpinensis is a moth in the family Crambidae. It was described by Hahn William Capps in 1967. It is found in North America, where it has been recorded from Arizona, New Mexico and Texas.

The wingspan is 20–23 mm for males and 21–23 mm for females. Adults have been recorded on the wing from March to September.
