= Neohelvibotys polingi =

Scientific classification
- Domain: Eukaryota
- Kingdom: Animalia
- Phylum: Arthropoda
- Class: Insecta
- Order: Lepidoptera
- Family: Crambidae
- Genus: Neohelvibotys
- Species: N. polingi

Binomial name
- Neohelvibotys polingi (Capps, 1967)

Synonyms
- Loxostege polingi Capps, 1967

Species of moth

Neohelvibotys polingi is a moth in the family Crambidae. It is found in the United States, where it has been recorded from Florida to Texas, Arizona and Oklahoma. It is also found in Mexico (Guerrero, Puebla, Zapotitlan, Oaxaca, Totolapam).

The wingspan is 18–23 mm for males and 19–23 mm for females. Adults are on wing from April to September in the United States and from June to October in Mexico.
