= Hahncappsia volcanensis =

Scientific classification
- Domain: Eukaryota
- Kingdom: Animalia
- Phylum: Arthropoda
- Class: Insecta
- Order: Lepidoptera
- Family: Crambidae
- Genus: Hahncappsia
- Species: H. volcanensis

Binomial name
- Hahncappsia volcanensis (Capps, 1967)

Synonyms
- Loxostege volcanensis Capps, 1967

Species of moth

Hahncappsia volcanensis is a moth in the family Crambidae described by Hahn William Capps in 1967. It is found in Guatemala, Costa Rica and Venezuela.

The wingspan is 12–22 mm for males and 19–21 mm for females. Adults have been recorded on wing from January to October.
