= Hahncappsia conisphoralis =

Scientific classification
- Domain: Eukaryota
- Kingdom: Animalia
- Phylum: Arthropoda
- Class: Insecta
- Order: Lepidoptera
- Family: Crambidae
- Genus: Hahncappsia
- Species: H. conisphoralis

Binomial name
- Hahncappsia conisphoralis (Capps, 1967)

Synonyms
- Loxostege conisphoralis Capps, 1967

Species of moth

Hahncappsia conisphoralis is a moth in the family Crambidae. It is found in Mexico (Chiapas, Veracruz, Yucatán), Guatemala and Costa Rica.

The wingspan is 22–23 mm for males and 22–26 mm for females. Adults have been recorded on wing from June to November.
