= Hahncappsia purulhalis =

Scientific classification
- Domain: Eukaryota
- Kingdom: Animalia
- Phylum: Arthropoda
- Class: Insecta
- Order: Lepidoptera
- Family: Crambidae
- Genus: Hahncappsia
- Species: H. purulhalis

Binomial name
- Hahncappsia purulhalis (Capps, 1967)

Synonyms
- Loxostege purulhalis Capps, 1967

Species of moth

Hahncappsia purulhalis is a moth in the family Crambidae. It was described by Hahn William Capps in 1967 and is found in Guatemala.

The wingspan is 20–21 mm. Adults have been recorded on wing in July.
