= Hahncappsia huachucalis =

Scientific classification
- Domain: Eukaryota
- Kingdom: Animalia
- Phylum: Arthropoda
- Class: Insecta
- Order: Lepidoptera
- Family: Crambidae
- Genus: Hahncappsia
- Species: H. huachucalis

Binomial name
- Hahncappsia huachucalis (Capps, 1967)

Synonyms
- Loxostege huachucalis Capps, 1967

Species of moth

Hahncappsia huachucalis is a moth in the family Crambidae. It was described by Hahn William Capps in 1967. It is found in North America, where it has been recorded from Arizona and Texas.

The wingspan is 21–24 mm for males and females. Adults have been recorded on wing from June to August.
