= Hahncappsia pseudobliteralis =

Scientific classification
- Domain: Eukaryota
- Kingdom: Animalia
- Phylum: Arthropoda
- Class: Insecta
- Order: Lepidoptera
- Family: Crambidae
- Genus: Hahncappsia
- Species: H. pseudobliteralis

Binomial name
- Hahncappsia pseudobliteralis (Capps, 1967)

Synonyms
- Loxostege pseudobliteralis Capps, 1967

Species of moth

Hahncappsia pseudobliteralis is a moth in the family Crambidae. It was described by Hahn William Capps in 1967. It is found in North America, where it has been recorded from Arizona and Texas. It has also been recorded from Morelos, Mexico.

The wingspan is 21–24 mm for males and 22–26 mm for females. Adults are on wing from July to September in the United States and in May in Mexico.

The larvae feed on Ipomoea species. Full-grown larvae reach a length of 24 mm.
