= Hahncappsia jaliscalis =

Scientific classification
- Domain: Eukaryota
- Kingdom: Animalia
- Phylum: Arthropoda
- Class: Insecta
- Order: Lepidoptera
- Family: Crambidae
- Genus: Hahncappsia
- Species: H. jaliscalis

Binomial name
- Hahncappsia jaliscalis (Capps, 1967)

Synonyms
- Loxostege jaliscalis Capps, 1967

Species of moth

Hahncappsia jaliscalis is a moth in the family Crambidae. It is found in Mexico (San Luis Potosí, Jalisco).

The wingspan is about 25 mm. Adults have been recorded on wing from August to September.
