= Haimbachia indistinctalis =

Scientific classification
- Domain: Eukaryota
- Kingdom: Animalia
- Phylum: Arthropoda
- Class: Insecta
- Order: Lepidoptera
- Family: Crambidae
- Subfamily: Crambinae
- Tribe: Haimbachiini
- Genus: Haimbachia
- Species: H. indistinctalis

Binomial name
- Haimbachia indistinctalis Capps, 1965

Species of moth

Haimbachia indistinctalis is a moth in the family Crambidae. It was described by Hahn William Capps in 1965. It is found in North America, where it has been recorded from Texas.
