= Hahncappsia corozalis =

Scientific classification
- Domain: Eukaryota
- Kingdom: Animalia
- Phylum: Arthropoda
- Class: Insecta
- Order: Lepidoptera
- Family: Crambidae
- Genus: Hahncappsia
- Species: H. corozalis

Binomial name
- Hahncappsia corozalis (Capps, 1967)

Synonyms
- Loxostege corozalis Capps, 1967

Species of moth

Hahncappsia corozalis is a moth in the family Crambidae. It is found in Panama, Costa Rica and Mexico (Veracruz, San Luis Potosí, Chiapas, Yucatán, Oaxaca, Morelos, Nayarit, Zacualpan).

The wingspan is 18–23 mm for males and 17–23 mm for females. Adults have been recorded on wing from April to November.
