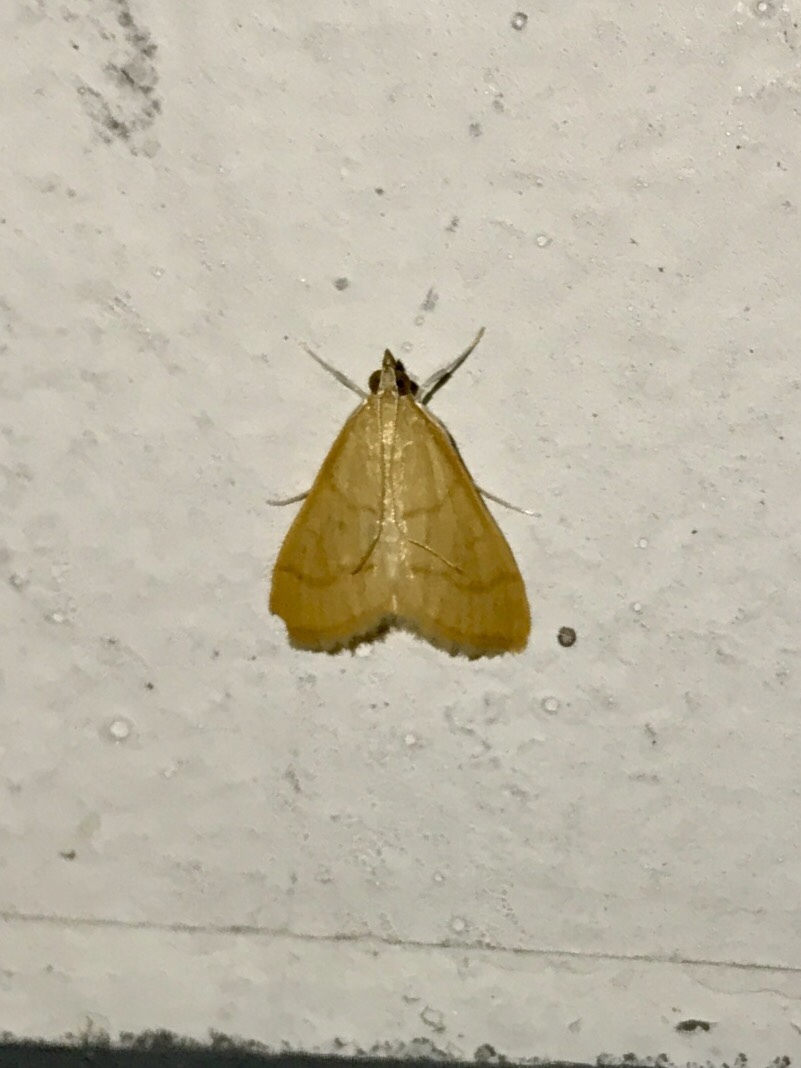

Scientific classification
- Domain: Eukaryota
- Kingdom: Animalia
- Phylum: Arthropoda
- Class: Insecta
- Order: Lepidoptera
- Family: Crambidae
- Genus: Hahncappsia
- Species: H. fordi

Binomial name
- Hahncappsia fordi (Capps, 1967)

Synonyms
- Loxostege fordi Capps, 1967

= Hahncappsia fordi =

Species of moth

Hahncappsia fordi is a moth in the family Crambidae. It was described by Hahn William Capps in 1967. It is found in the south-western United States, where it has been recorded from California and Arizona, as well as Sonora, Mexico.

The wingspan is 18–20 mm for males and 17–20 mm for females. Adults have been recorded on wing from April to October.
