= Neohelvibotys nayaritensis =

Scientific classification
- Domain: Eukaryota
- Kingdom: Animalia
- Phylum: Arthropoda
- Class: Insecta
- Order: Lepidoptera
- Family: Crambidae
- Genus: Neohelvibotys
- Species: N. nayaritensis

Binomial name
- Neohelvibotys nayaritensis (Capps, 1967)

Synonyms
- Loxostege nayaritensis Capps, 1967

Species of moth

Neohelvibotys nayaritensis is a moth in the family Crambidae described by Hahn William Capps in 1967. It is found in Nayarit, Mexico.

The wingspan is about 25 mm for males and 22 mm for females. Adults have been recorded on wing in August.
