= Haimbachia diminutalis =

Scientific classification
- Domain: Eukaryota
- Kingdom: Animalia
- Phylum: Arthropoda
- Class: Insecta
- Order: Lepidoptera
- Family: Crambidae
- Subfamily: Crambinae
- Tribe: Haimbachiini
- Genus: Haimbachia
- Species: H. diminutalis

Binomial name
- Haimbachia diminutalis Capps, 1965

Species of moth

Haimbachia diminutalis is a moth in the family Crambidae. It was described by Hahn William Capps in 1965. It is found in North America, where it has been recorded from Oklahoma and Texas.

The wingspan is about 16 mm. Adults are on wing in May, July and October.
