= Hahncappsia potosiensis =

Scientific classification
- Domain: Eukaryota
- Kingdom: Animalia
- Phylum: Arthropoda
- Class: Insecta
- Order: Lepidoptera
- Family: Crambidae
- Genus: Hahncappsia
- Species: H. potosiensis

Binomial name
- Hahncappsia potosiensis (Capps, 1967)

Synonyms
- Loxostege potosiensis Capps, 1967

Species of moth

Hahncappsia potosiensis is a moth in the family Crambidae. It was described by Hahn William Capps in 1967 and it is found in the Mexican state of San Luis Potosí.

The wingspan is about 22 mm. Adults have been recorded on wing from May to August.
