= Hahncappsia cochisensis =

Scientific classification
- Domain: Eukaryota
- Kingdom: Animalia
- Phylum: Arthropoda
- Class: Insecta
- Order: Lepidoptera
- Family: Crambidae
- Genus: Hahncappsia
- Species: H. cochisensis

Binomial name
- Hahncappsia cochisensis (Capps, 1967)

Synonyms
- Loxostege cochisensis Capps, 1967

Species of moth

Hahncappsia cochisensis is a moth in the family Crambidae. It was described by Hahn William Capps in 1967. It is found in North America, where it has been recorded from Arizona and western Texas.

The wingspan is 21–26 mm for males and 19–26 mm for females. Adults have been recorded on wing from June to September.
