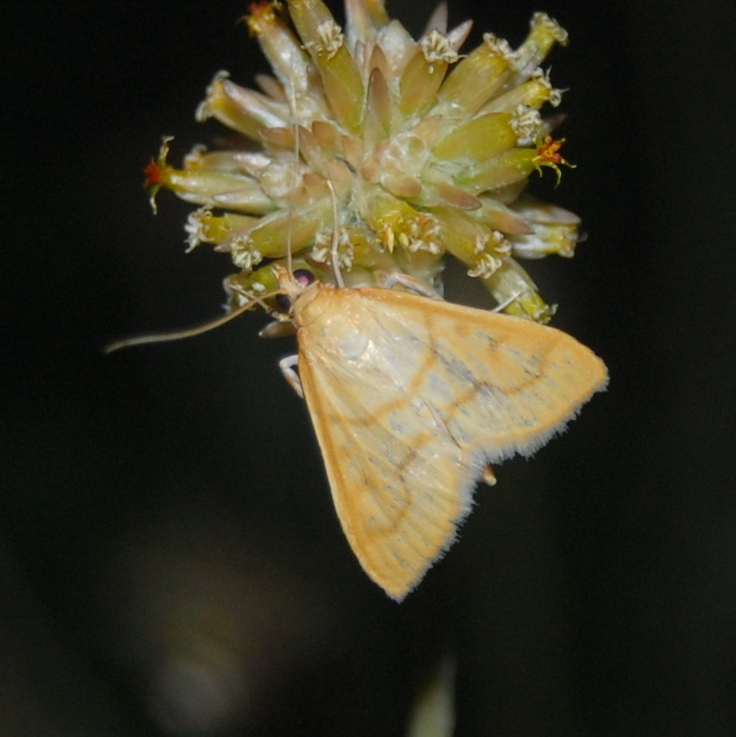

Scientific classification
- Kingdom: Animalia
- Phylum: Arthropoda
- Clade: Pancrustacea
- Class: Insecta
- Order: Lepidoptera
- Family: Crambidae
- Genus: Neohelvibotys
- Species: N. pelotasalis

Binomial name
- Neohelvibotys pelotasalis (Capps, 1967)

Synonyms
- Loxostege pelotasalis Capps, 1967

= Neohelvibotys pelotasalis =

Species of moth

Neohelvibotys pelotasalis is a species of moth in the family Crambidae that was first described by Hahn William Capps in 1967. It is found in Rio Grande do Sul, Brazil.

The wingspan is about 18 mm. Adults have been recorded on wing in May.
