= Hahncappsia neotropicalis =

Scientific classification
- Domain: Eukaryota
- Kingdom: Animalia
- Phylum: Arthropoda
- Class: Insecta
- Order: Lepidoptera
- Family: Crambidae
- Genus: Hahncappsia
- Species: H. neotropicalis

Binomial name
- Hahncappsia neotropicalis (Capps, 1967)

Synonyms
- Loxostege neotropicalis Capps, 1967

Species of moth

Hahncappsia neotropicalis is a moth in the family Crambidae described by Hahn William Capps in 1967. It is found in Mexico (Xalapa), Guatemala, Costa Rica and Venezuela.

The wingspan is 22–25 mm for males and 25–28 mm for females. Adults have been recorded on wing from May to October.
