= Achyra brasiliensis =

Scientific classification
- Kingdom: Animalia
- Phylum: Arthropoda
- Clade: Pancrustacea
- Class: Insecta
- Order: Lepidoptera
- Family: Crambidae
- Genus: Achyra
- Species: A. brasiliensis

Binomial name
- Achyra brasiliensis (Capps, 1967)

Synonyms
- Loxostege brasiliensis Capps, 1967

Species of moth

Achyra brasiliensis is a moth in the family Crambidae. It was described by Hahn William Capps in 1967. It is found in São Paulo, Brazil.
