= Hahncappsia yucatanalis =

Scientific classification
- Domain: Eukaryota
- Kingdom: Animalia
- Phylum: Arthropoda
- Class: Insecta
- Order: Lepidoptera
- Family: Crambidae
- Genus: Hahncappsia
- Species: H. yucatanalis

Binomial name
- Hahncappsia yucatanalis (Capps, 1967)

Synonyms
- Loxostege yucatanalis Capps, 1967

Species of moth

Hahncappsia yucatanalis is a moth in the family Crambidae. It is found in Mexico (Yucatán).

The wingspan is about 20 mm (0.79 in).
