= Hahncappsia neomarculenta =

Scientific classification
- Domain: Eukaryota
- Kingdom: Animalia
- Phylum: Arthropoda
- Class: Insecta
- Order: Lepidoptera
- Family: Crambidae
- Genus: Hahncappsia
- Species: H. neomarculenta

Binomial name
- Hahncappsia neomarculenta (Capps, 1967)

Synonyms
- Loxostege neomarculenta Capps, 1967

Species of moth

Hahncappsia neomarculenta is a moth in the family Crambidae. It was described by Hahn William Capps in 1967. It is found in North America, where it has been recorded from Maryland, Indiana, West Virginia, North Carolina, Ohio and Tennessee.

The wingspan is 22–24 mm for males and 22–23 mm for females. Adults have been recorded on wing from May to July.
