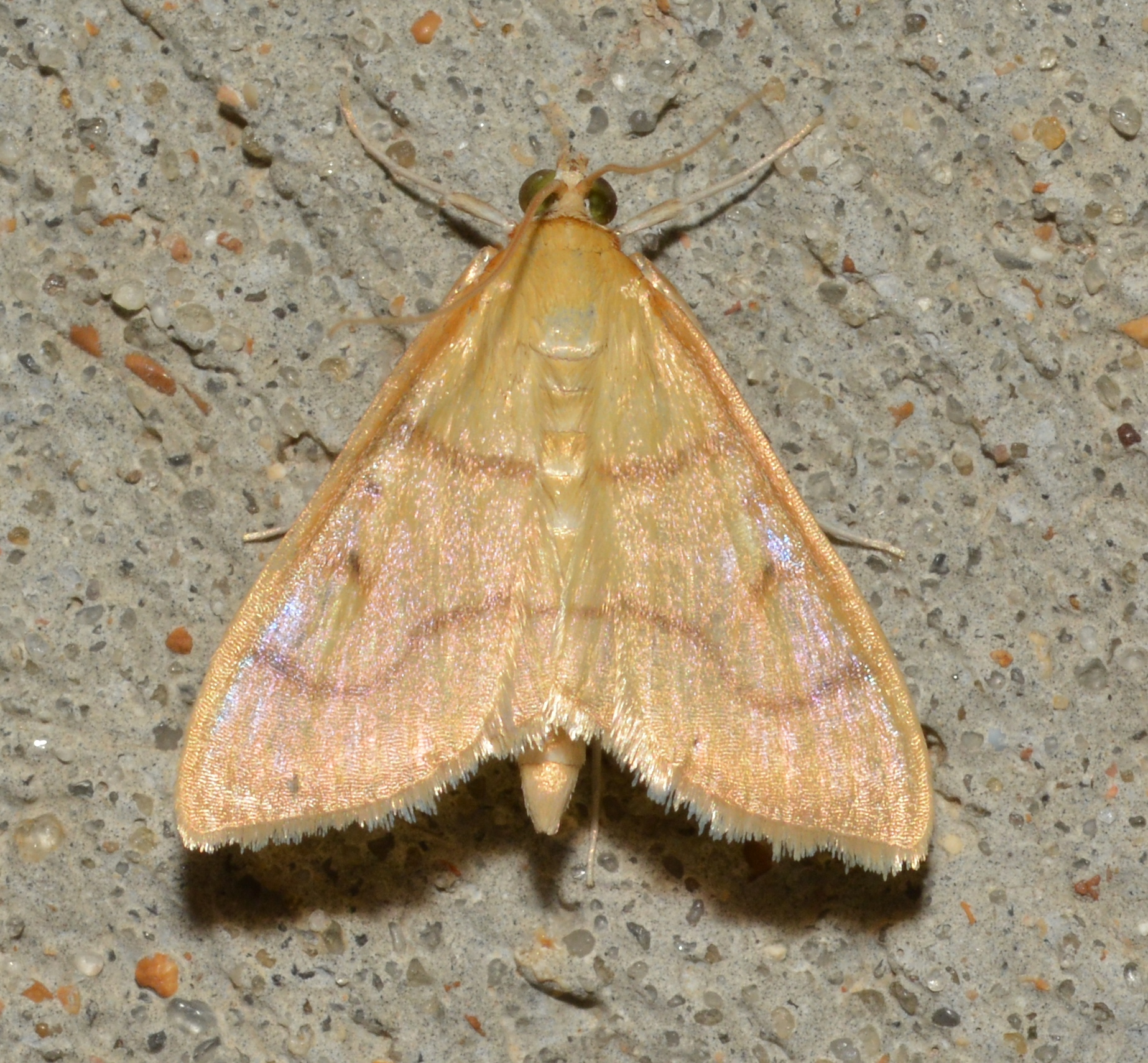

Scientific classification
- Domain: Eukaryota
- Kingdom: Animalia
- Phylum: Arthropoda
- Class: Insecta
- Order: Lepidoptera
- Family: Crambidae
- Genus: Neohelvibotys
- Species: N. neohelvialis

Binomial name
- Neohelvibotys neohelvialis (Capps, 1967)

Synonyms
- Loxostege neohelvialis Capps, 1967

= Neohelvibotys neohelvialis =

Species of moth

Neohelvibotys neohelvialis is a moth in the family Crambidae. It was described by Hahn William Capps in 1967. It is found in the United States, where it has been recorded from Georgia and Florida to Arizona, as well as in the West Indies and from Mexico to Panama.

The wingspan is 18–23 mm for males and 20–23 mm for females. Adults have been recorded on wing from June to September.
