= Hahncappsia ecuadoralis =

Scientific classification
- Domain: Eukaryota
- Kingdom: Animalia
- Phylum: Arthropoda
- Class: Insecta
- Order: Lepidoptera
- Family: Crambidae
- Genus: Hahncappsia
- Species: H. ecuadoralis

Binomial name
- Hahncappsia ecuadoralis (Capps, 1967)

Synonyms
- Loxostege ecuadoralis Capps, 1967

Species of moth

Hahncappsia ecuadoralis is a moth in the family Crambidae described by Hahn William Capps in 1967. It is found in Peru, Ecuador and Bolivia.

The wingspan is 24–26 mm for males and about 26 mm for females. Adults have been recorded on wing from November to January.
