= Neohelvibotys boliviensis =

Scientific classification
- Kingdom: Animalia
- Phylum: Arthropoda
- Clade: Pancrustacea
- Class: Insecta
- Order: Lepidoptera
- Family: Crambidae
- Genus: Neohelvibotys
- Species: N. boliviensis

Binomial name
- Neohelvibotys boliviensis (Capps, 1967)

Synonyms
- Loxostege boliviensis Capps, 1967

Species of moth

Neohelvibotys boliviensis is a moth in the family Crambidae described by Hahn William Capps in 1967. It is found in Bolivia.

The wingspan is about 19 mm. Adults have been recorded on wing in December.
