= Hahncappsia chiapasalis =

Scientific classification
- Domain: Eukaryota
- Kingdom: Animalia
- Phylum: Arthropoda
- Class: Insecta
- Order: Lepidoptera
- Family: Crambidae
- Genus: Hahncappsia
- Species: H. chiapasalis

Binomial name
- Hahncappsia chiapasalis (Capps, 1967)

Synonyms
- Loxostege chiapasalis Capps, 1967

Species of moth

Hahncappsia chiapasalis is a moth in the family Crambidae described by Hahn William Capps in 1967. It is found in Chiapas, Mexico.

The wingspan is about 22 mm. The forewings and hindwings are uniform brownish yellow.
