= Hahncappsia marialis =

Scientific classification
- Domain: Eukaryota
- Kingdom: Animalia
- Phylum: Arthropoda
- Class: Insecta
- Order: Lepidoptera
- Family: Crambidae
- Genus: Hahncappsia
- Species: H. marialis

Binomial name
- Hahncappsia marialis (Capps, 1967)

Synonyms
- Loxostege marialis Capps, 1967

Species of moth

Hahncappsia marialis is a moth in the family Crambidae. It was described by Hahn William Capps in 1967 and it is found in Guatemala.

The wingspan is about 24 mm for males and 24–26 mm for females. Adults have been recorded on wing in June.
