= Hahncappsia jacalensis =

Scientific classification
- Domain: Eukaryota
- Kingdom: Animalia
- Phylum: Arthropoda
- Class: Insecta
- Order: Lepidoptera
- Family: Crambidae
- Genus: Hahncappsia
- Species: H. jacalensis

Binomial name
- Hahncappsia jacalensis (Capps, 1967)

Synonyms
- Loxostege jacalensis Capps, 1967

Species of moth

Hahncappsia jacalensis is a moth in the family Crambidae. It was described by Hahn William Capps in 1967 and it is found in Hidalgo, Mexico.

The wingspan is about 21 mm.
