= Haimbachia leucopleuralis =

Scientific classification
- Domain: Eukaryota
- Kingdom: Animalia
- Phylum: Arthropoda
- Class: Insecta
- Order: Lepidoptera
- Family: Crambidae
- Subfamily: Crambinae
- Tribe: Haimbachiini
- Genus: Haimbachia
- Species: H. leucopleuralis

Binomial name
- Haimbachia leucopleuralis (Mabille, 1900)

Synonyms
- Platytes leucopleuralis Mabille, 1900

Species of moth

Haimbachia leucopleuralis is a moth in the family Crambidae. It was described by Paul Mabille in 1900. It is found on the Comoros and in Madagascar.
