= Haimbachia quiriguella =

Scientific classification
- Domain: Eukaryota
- Kingdom: Animalia
- Phylum: Arthropoda
- Class: Insecta
- Order: Lepidoptera
- Family: Crambidae
- Subfamily: Crambinae
- Tribe: Haimbachiini
- Genus: Haimbachia
- Species: H. quiriguella

Binomial name
- Haimbachia quiriguella Schaus, 1922

Species of moth

Haimbachia quiriguella is a moth in the family Crambidae. It was described by Schaus in 1922. It is found in Guatemala.
