= Achyra imperialis =

Scientific classification
- Kingdom: Animalia
- Phylum: Arthropoda
- Clade: Pancrustacea
- Class: Insecta
- Order: Lepidoptera
- Family: Crambidae
- Genus: Achyra
- Species: A. imperialis

Binomial name
- Achyra imperialis (Sauber in Semper, 1899)

Synonyms
- Eurycreon imperialis Sauber in Semper, 1899

Species of moth

Achyra imperialis is a moth in the family Crambidae. It was described by Sauber in 1899. It is found on Luzon in the Philippines.
