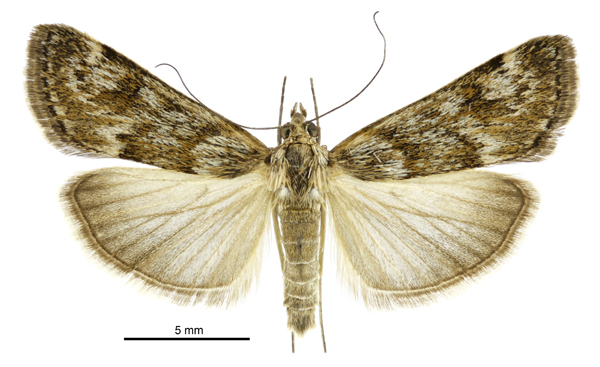
- Female
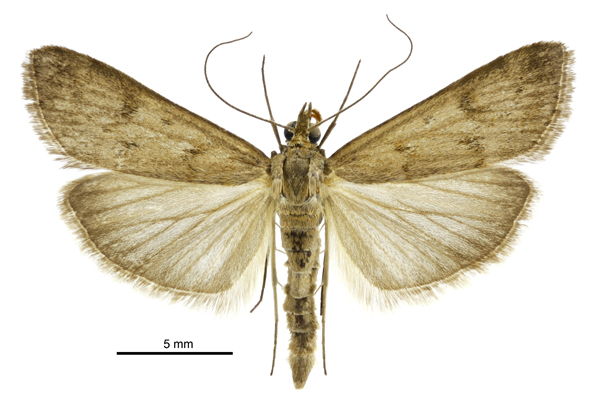
- Male

Scientific classification
- Kingdom: Animalia
- Phylum: Arthropoda
- Clade: Pancrustacea
- Class: Insecta
- Order: Lepidoptera
- Family: Crambidae
- Genus: Achyra
- Species: A. affinitalis

Binomial name
- Achyra affinitalis (Lederer, 1863)

Synonyms
- Botys affinitalis Lederer, 1863; Loxostege ustalis; Nymphula sordida Butler, 1886; Scopula turbidalis Walker, 1866; Scopula ustalis Walker, [1866]

= Achyra affinitalis =

Species of moth

Achyra affinitalis, the cotton web spinner, is a moth of the family Crambidae. It was first described by Julius Lederer in 1863. This species is found in Australia and New Zealand.

== Description ==
The wingspan is about 20 mm.

== Host plants ==
The larvae feed on Helianthus annuus, Medicago sativa, Linum usatissimum, Gossypium hirsutum, Sorghum bicolor and Atriplex species.
