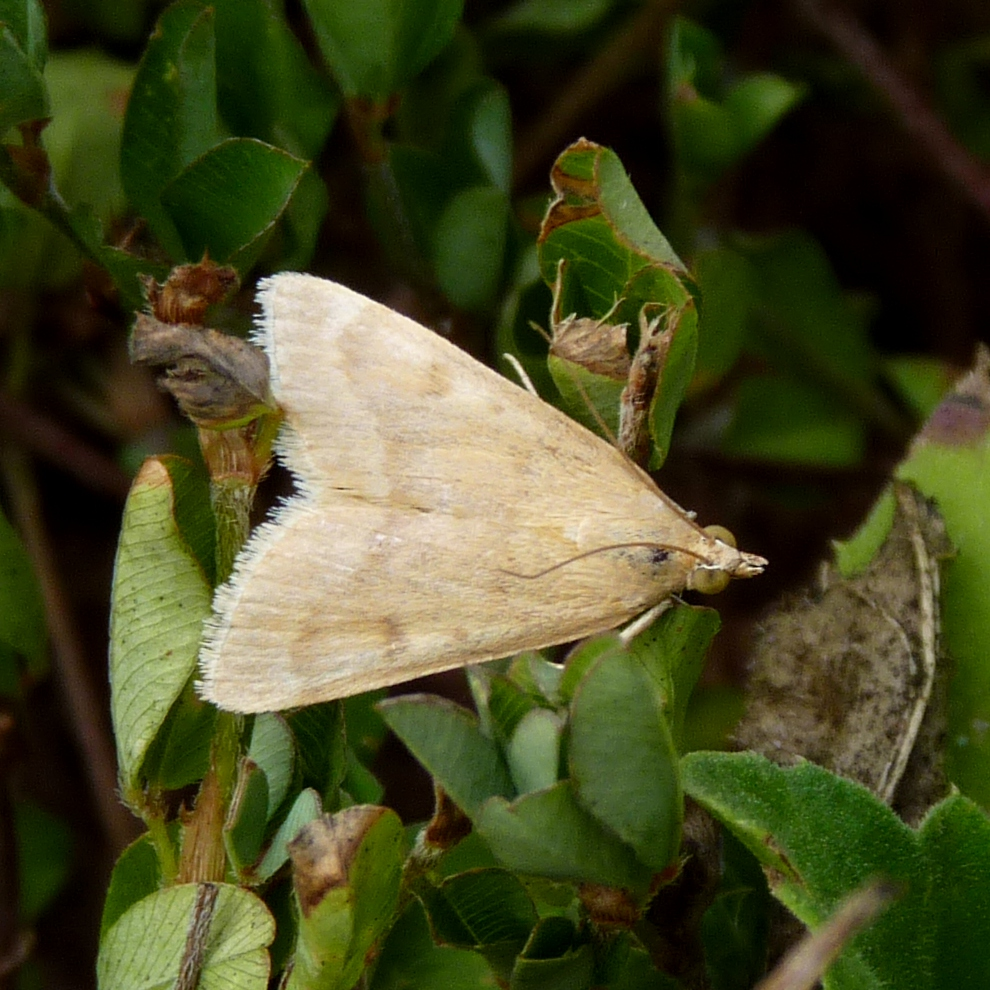

Scientific classification
- Kingdom: Animalia
- Phylum: Arthropoda
- Clade: Pancrustacea
- Class: Insecta
- Order: Lepidoptera
- Family: Crambidae
- Genus: Achyra
- Species: A. rantalis

Binomial name
- Achyra rantalis (Guenée, 1854)

Synonyms
- Nymphula rantalis Guenée, 1854; Botis communis Grote, 1876; Botys licealis Walker, 1859; Botys posticata Grote & Robinson, 1867; Botys siriusalis Walker, 1859; Botys subfulvalis Herrich-Schäffer, 1871; Botys viscendalis Möschler, 1890; Ebulea murcialis Walker, 1859; Eurycreon collucidalis Möschler, 1890; Nephopteryx intractella Walker, 1863; Pyrausta caffrei Flint & Malloch, 1920; Scopula crinisalis Walker, 1859; Botys crinitalis Lederer, 1863; Scopula diotimealis Walker, 1859; Scopula nestusalis Walker, 1859; Nymphula similalis Guenée, 1854; Tritea ferruginea Warren, 1892; Pyralis garalis Schaus, 1906; Scopula thoonalis Walker, 1859

= Achyra rantalis =

Species of moth

Achyra rantalis, the garden webworm, is a moth of the family Crambidae described by Achille Guenée in 1854. It is found in North America, where it has been recorded from Maine to southern Quebec and Ontario, south to Florida and Mexico. It has also been recorded in Iowa, Colorado, California, and the West Indies. Its habitat consists of fields and gardens.

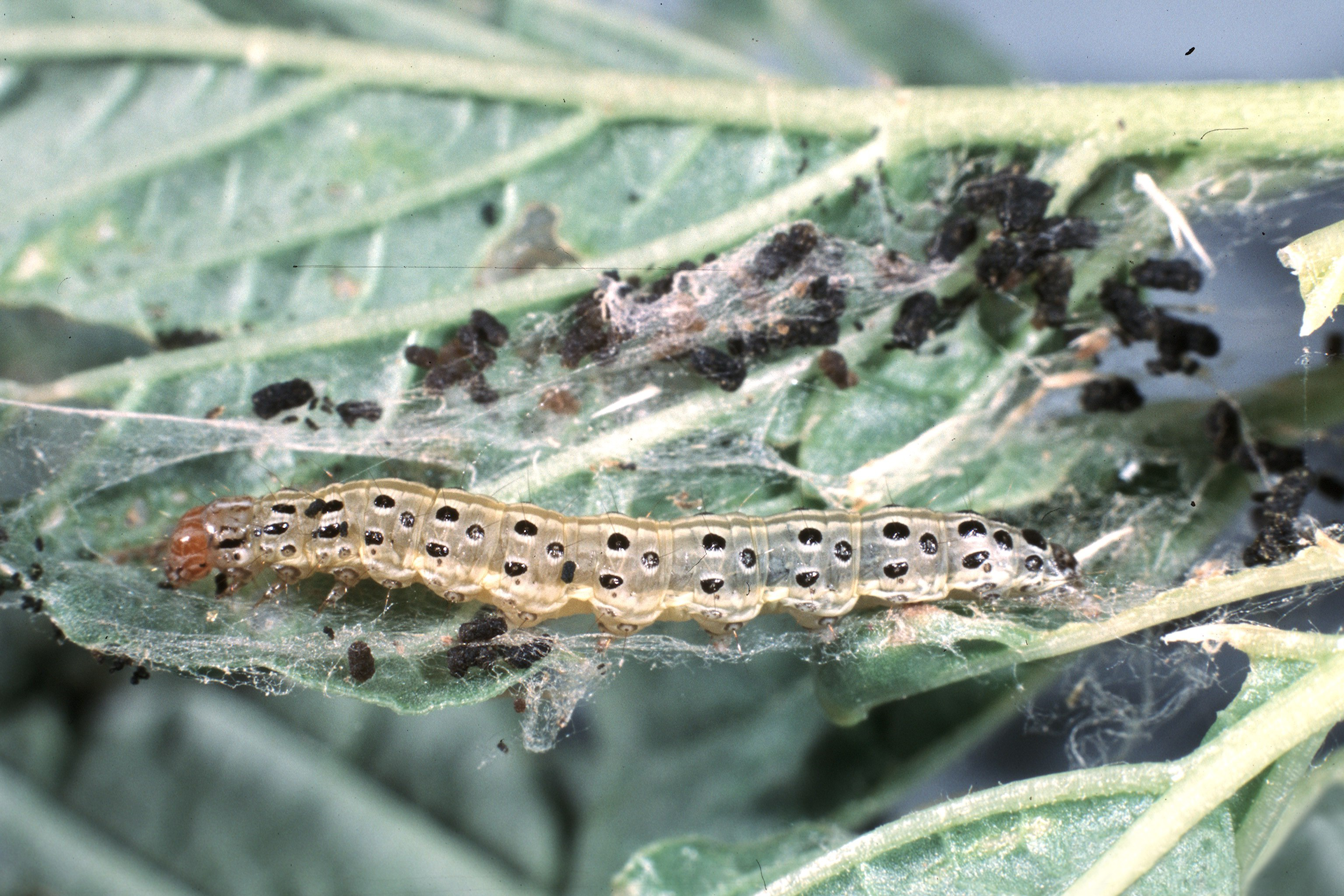
Caterpillar

The wingspan is 17–23 millimetres (0.67–0.91 in). There may be up to four generations per year in the south.

The larvae feed on the leaves of various low-growing plants, including alfalfa, beans, clover, corn, cotton, peas and strawberries.
