= Achyra arida =

Scientific classification
- Kingdom: Animalia
- Phylum: Arthropoda
- Clade: Pancrustacea
- Class: Insecta
- Order: Lepidoptera
- Family: Crambidae
- Genus: Achyra
- Species: A. arida

Binomial name
- Achyra arida Maes, 2005

Species of moth

Achyra arida is a moth in the family Crambidae. It was described by Koen V. N. Maes in 2005. It is found in Kenya.
