= Hahncappsia entephrialis =

Scientific classification
- Kingdom: Animalia
- Phylum: Arthropoda
- Clade: Pancrustacea
- Class: Insecta
- Order: Lepidoptera
- Family: Crambidae
- Genus: Hahncappsia
- Species: H. entephrialis

Binomial name
- Hahncappsia entephrialis (Schaus, 1912)

Synonyms
- Pyrausta entephrialis Schaus, 1912

Species of moth

Hahncappsia entephrialis is a moth in the family Crambidae described by William Schaus in 1912. It is found in Costa Rica.

The wingspan is about 25 mm. Adults have been recorded on wing in October.
