= Hahncappsia nigripes =

Scientific classification
- Domain: Eukaryota
- Kingdom: Animalia
- Phylum: Arthropoda
- Class: Insecta
- Order: Lepidoptera
- Family: Crambidae
- Genus: Hahncappsia
- Species: H. nigripes

Binomial name
- Hahncappsia nigripes (Schaus, 1920)

Synonyms
- Psara nigripes Schaus, 1920

Species of moth

Hahncappsia nigripes is a moth in the family Crambidae. It was described by William Schaus in 1920. It is found in Guatemala and Mexico.

The wingspan is 28–30 mm for males and 27–30 mm for females. The wings are uniform orange. Adults have been recorded on wing from June to October.
