= Haimbachia diaperalis =

Scientific classification
- Kingdom: Animalia
- Phylum: Arthropoda
- Class: Insecta
- Order: Lepidoptera
- Family: Crambidae
- Subfamily: Crambinae
- Tribe: Haimbachiini
- Genus: Haimbachia
- Species: H. diaperalis

Binomial name
- Haimbachia diaperalis (Hampson, 1919)

Synonyms
- Diatraea diaperalis Hampson, 1919

Species of moth

Haimbachia diaperalis is a moth in the family Crambidae. It was described by George Hampson in 1919. It is found in Bhutan.
