= Achyra protealis =

Scientific classification
- Kingdom: Animalia
- Phylum: Arthropoda
- Clade: Pancrustacea
- Class: Insecta
- Order: Lepidoptera
- Family: Crambidae
- Genus: Achyra
- Species: A. protealis

Binomial name
- Achyra protealis (Warren, 1892)

Synonyms
- Tritaea protealis Warren, 1892

Species of moth

Achyra protealis is a moth in the family Crambidae. It was described by Warren in 1892. It is endemic to Peru.
