= Haimbachia proalbivenalis =

Scientific classification
- Domain: Eukaryota
- Kingdom: Animalia
- Phylum: Arthropoda
- Class: Insecta
- Order: Lepidoptera
- Family: Crambidae
- Subfamily: Crambinae
- Tribe: Haimbachiini
- Genus: Haimbachia
- Species: H. proalbivenalis

Binomial name
- Haimbachia proalbivenalis (Błeszyński, 1961)

Synonyms
- Eoreuma proalbivenalis Błeszyński, 1961; Coniesta proalbivenalis belgaumensis Kapur, 1950; Diatraea albivenalis Hampson, 1919

Species of moth

Haimbachia proalbivenalis is a moth in the family Crambidae. It was described by Stanisław Błeszyński in 1961. It is found in Nigeria, the Gambia and India.
