= Hahncappsia praxitalis =

Scientific classification
- Kingdom: Animalia
- Phylum: Arthropoda
- Clade: Pancrustacea
- Class: Insecta
- Order: Lepidoptera
- Family: Crambidae
- Genus: Hahncappsia
- Species: H. praxitalis

Binomial name
- Hahncappsia praxitalis (H. Druce, 1895)

Synonyms
- Phlyctaenia praxitalis H. Druce, 1895

Species of moth

Hahncappsia praxitalis is a moth in the family Crambidae. It was described by Herbert Druce in 1895. It is found in Mexico (Jalapa, Veracruz), Guatemala and Costa Rica.
