= Haimbachia proaraealis =

Scientific classification
- Domain: Eukaryota
- Kingdom: Animalia
- Phylum: Arthropoda
- Class: Insecta
- Order: Lepidoptera
- Family: Crambidae
- Subfamily: Crambinae
- Tribe: Haimbachiini
- Genus: Haimbachia
- Species: H. proaraealis

Binomial name
- Haimbachia proaraealis (Błeszyński, 1961)

Synonyms
- Eoreuma proaraealis Błeszyński, 1961; Argyria araealis Hampson, 1919

Species of moth

Haimbachia proaraealis is a moth in the family Crambidae. It was described by Stanisław Błeszyński in 1961. It is found on Mahé in Seychelles and in South Africa and Zimbabwe.
