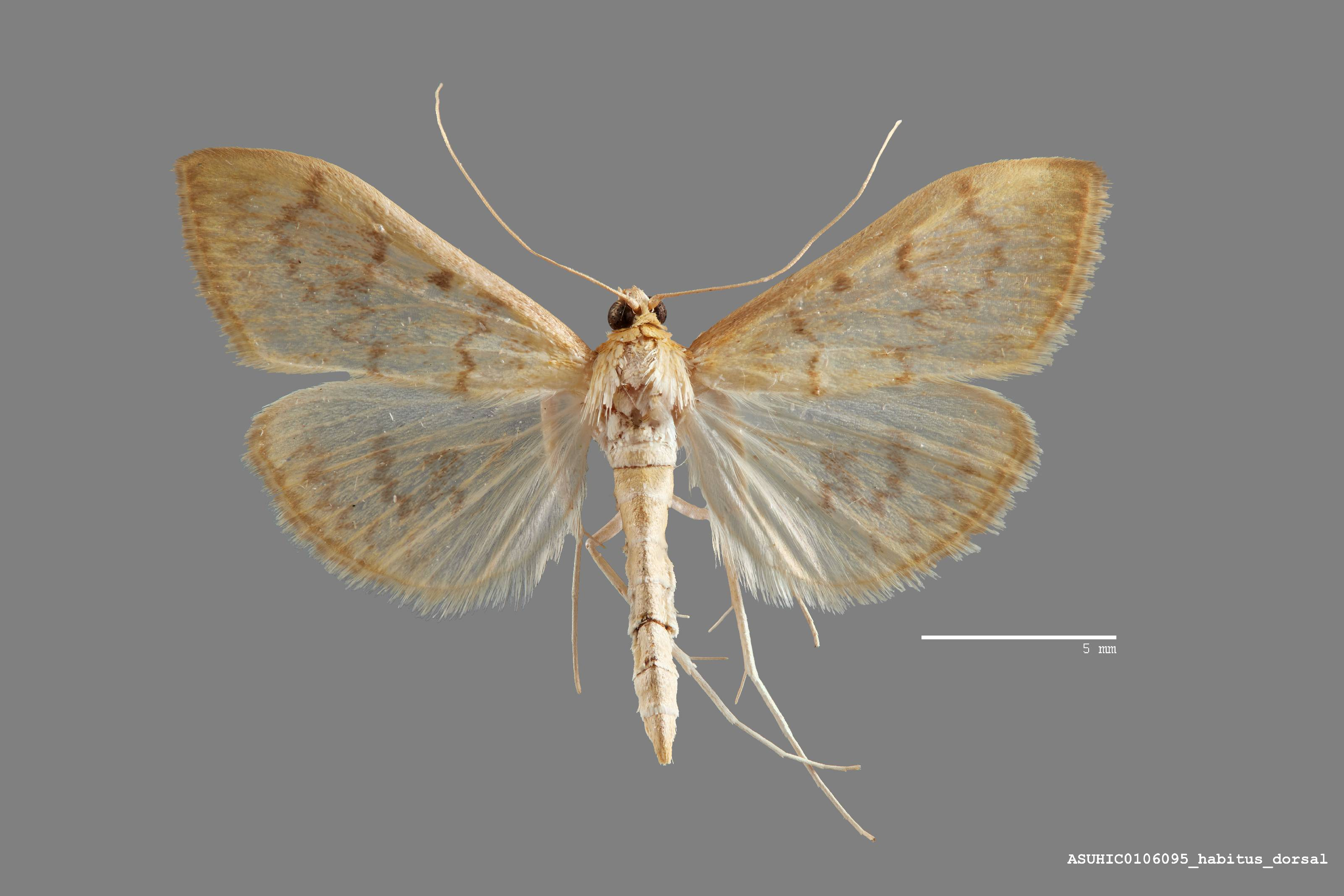

Scientific classification
- Domain: Eukaryota
- Kingdom: Animalia
- Phylum: Arthropoda
- Class: Insecta
- Order: Lepidoptera
- Family: Crambidae
- Genus: Hahncappsia
- Species: H. mellinialis

Binomial name
- Hahncappsia mellinialis (H. Druce, 1899)

Synonyms
- Epichronistis mellinialis H. Druce, 1899; Phlyctaenodes phrixalis Dyar, 1914

= Hahncappsia mellinialis =

Species of moth

Hahncappsia mellinialis is a moth in the family Crambidae. It was described by Herbert Druce in 1899. It is found in Colorado, Arizona, New Mexico, Mexico and Guatemala.

The wingspan is 28–32 mm for males and 27–31 mm for females. The forewings are straw yellow, irrorated (sprinkled) with buff. The hindwings are somewhat paler. Adults have been recorded on wing from July to September.
