= Haimbachia mlanjella =

Scientific classification
- Kingdom: Animalia
- Phylum: Arthropoda
- Clade: Pancrustacea
- Class: Insecta
- Order: Lepidoptera
- Family: Crambidae
- Subfamily: Crambinae
- Tribe: Haimbachiini
- Genus: Haimbachia
- Species: H. mlanjella

Binomial name
- Haimbachia mlanjella (Błeszyński, 1961)

Synonyms
- Eoreuma mlanjella Błeszyński, 1961

Species of moth

Haimbachia mlanjella is a moth in the family Crambidae. It was described by Stanisław Błeszyński in 1961. It is found in Malawi.
