= Hahncappsia suarezalis =

Scientific classification
- Domain: Eukaryota
- Kingdom: Animalia
- Phylum: Arthropoda
- Class: Insecta
- Order: Lepidoptera
- Family: Crambidae
- Genus: Hahncappsia
- Species: H. suarezalis

Binomial name
- Hahncappsia suarezalis Munroe, 1978

Species of moth

Hahncappsia suarezalis is a moth in the family Crambidae. It is found in Bolivia.
