= Hahncappsia ramsdenalis =

Scientific classification
- Domain: Eukaryota
- Kingdom: Animalia
- Phylum: Arthropoda
- Class: Insecta
- Order: Lepidoptera
- Family: Crambidae
- Genus: Hahncappsia
- Species: H. ramsdenalis

Binomial name
- Hahncappsia ramsdenalis (Schaus, 1920)

Synonyms
- Phlyctaenodes ramsdenalis Schaus, 1920

Species of moth

Hahncappsia ramsdenalis is a moth in the family Crambidae. It was described by Schaus in 1920. It is found in Cuba, the Cayman Islands, Mexico (Jalapa, Oaxaca), Guatemala, Venezuela, Brazil and Bolivia.

The wingspan is 17–20 mm. Adults have been recorded on wing from April to June.
