= Hahncappsia cynoalis =

Scientific classification
- Domain: Eukaryota
- Kingdom: Animalia
- Phylum: Arthropoda
- Class: Insecta
- Order: Lepidoptera
- Family: Crambidae
- Genus: Hahncappsia
- Species: H. cynoalis

Binomial name
- Hahncappsia cynoalis (H. Druce, 1895)

Synonyms
- Pachyzancla cynoalis H. Druce, 1895

Species of moth

Hahncappsia cynoalis is a moth in the family Crambidae. It was described by Herbert Druce in 1895. It is found in Guatemala and Panama.

The wingspan is about 23 mm for males and 20–21 mm for females. Adults have been recorded on wing in May.
