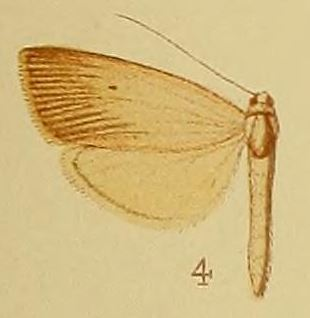
- Haimbachia fuscicilia

Scientific classification
- Domain: Eukaryota
- Kingdom: Animalia
- Phylum: Arthropoda
- Class: Insecta
- Order: Lepidoptera
- Family: Crambidae
- Subfamily: Crambinae
- Tribe: Haimbachiini
- Genus: Haimbachia; Dyar, 1909

= Haimbachia =

Genus of moths

Haimbachia is a genus of moths of the family Crambidae.

== Species ==
- Haimbachia aculeata (Hampson, 1903)
- Haimbachia albescens Capps, 1965
- Haimbachia albiceps (Hampson, 1919)
- Haimbachia arizonensis Capps, 1965
- Haimbachia cochisensis Capps, 1965
- Haimbachia diaperalis (Hampson, 1919)
- Haimbachia diminutalis Capps, 1965
- Haimbachia discalis Dyar & Heinrich, 1927
- Haimbachia dumptalis Schaus, 1922
- Haimbachia flavalis (Hampson, 1919)
- Haimbachia floridalis Capps, 1965
- Haimbachia fuscicilia (Hampson, 1910)
- Haimbachia gloriella Schaus, 1922
- Haimbachia hampsoni (Kapur, 1950)
- Haimbachia indistinctalis Capps, 1965
- Haimbachia leucopleuralis (Mabille, 1900)
- Haimbachia lunilinealis (Hampson, 1919)
- Haimbachia maroniella Dyar & Heinrich, 1927
- Haimbachia mlanjella (Bleszynski, 1961)
- Haimbachia pallescens Capps, 1965
- Haimbachia placidellus (Haimbach, 1907)
- Haimbachia prestonella Schaus, 1922
- Haimbachia proalbivenalis (Bleszynski, 1961)
- Haimbachia proaraealis (Bleszynski, 1961)
- Haimbachia quiriguella Schaus, 1922
- Haimbachia rufifusalis (Hampson, 1919)
- Haimbachia rufistrigalis (Hampson, 1919)
- Haimbachia squamulella (Zeller, 1881)
- Haimbachia strigulalis (Hampson, 1896)
- Haimbachia subterminalis (Hampson, 1919)
- Haimbachia unipunctalis (Hampson, 1919)
