= Haimbachia discalis =

Scientific classification
- Domain: Eukaryota
- Kingdom: Animalia
- Phylum: Arthropoda
- Class: Insecta
- Order: Lepidoptera
- Family: Crambidae
- Subfamily: Crambinae
- Tribe: Haimbachiini
- Genus: Haimbachia
- Species: H. discalis

Binomial name
- Haimbachia discalis Dyar & Heinrich, 1927

Species of moth

Haimbachia discalis is a moth in the family Crambidae. It was described by Harrison Gray Dyar Jr. and Carl Heinrich in 1927. It is found in Xalapa, Mexico.
