= Haimbachia strigulalis =

Scientific classification
- Kingdom: Animalia
- Phylum: Arthropoda
- Class: Insecta
- Order: Lepidoptera
- Family: Crambidae
- Subfamily: Crambinae
- Tribe: Haimbachiini
- Genus: Haimbachia
- Species: H. strigulalis

Binomial name
- Haimbachia strigulalis (Hampson, 1896)

Synonyms
- Platytes strigulalis Hampson, 1896; Platytes strigulalis f. cantoniellus Caradja, 1926; Platytes strigulalis f. cantoniellus Wu, 1938

Species of moth

Haimbachia strigulalis is a moth in the family Crambidae. It was described by George Hampson in 1896. It is found in India, Sri Lanka and China.

== Description ==
The wingspan is about 20 mm and it is a white moth. Palpi fuscous at sides. Abdomen with two basal segments yellow above. Forewings with oblique yellow brown striga from the costa. Slight brown streaks found below costa and in cell. The inner area irrorated (speckled) with a few brown scales and with traces of a medial oblique line. A dark discocellular speck. The outer area prominently streaked with yellow brown. There is an indistinct waved submarginal line bent inwards to costa and inner margin. A marginal series of black specks. Hindwings white.
