= Hahncappsia lautalis =

Scientific classification
- Domain: Eukaryota
- Kingdom: Animalia
- Phylum: Arthropoda
- Class: Insecta
- Order: Lepidoptera
- Family: Crambidae
- Genus: Hahncappsia
- Species: H. lautalis

Binomial name
- Hahncappsia lautalis (Lederer, 1863)

Synonyms
- Botys lautalis Lederer, 1863; Boeotarcha fallalis Schaus, 1924

Species of moth

Hahncappsia lautalis is a moth in the family Crambidae described by Julius Lederer in 1863. It is found in Colombia and Brazil.
