= Neohelvibotys =

Scientific classification
- Kingdom: Animalia
- Phylum: Arthropoda
- Class: Insecta
- Order: Lepidoptera
- Family: Crambidae
- Subfamily: Pyraustinae
- Genus: Neohelvibotys; Munroe, 1976

Genus of moths

Neohelvibotys is a genus of moths of the family Crambidae.

== Species ==
- Neohelvibotys arizonensis
- Neohelvibotys boliviensis
- Neohelvibotys nayaritensis
- Neohelvibotys neohelvialis (Capps, 1967)
- Neohelvibotys oxalis
- Neohelvibotys pelotasalis
- Neohelvibotys polingi
- Neohelvibotys saltensis
