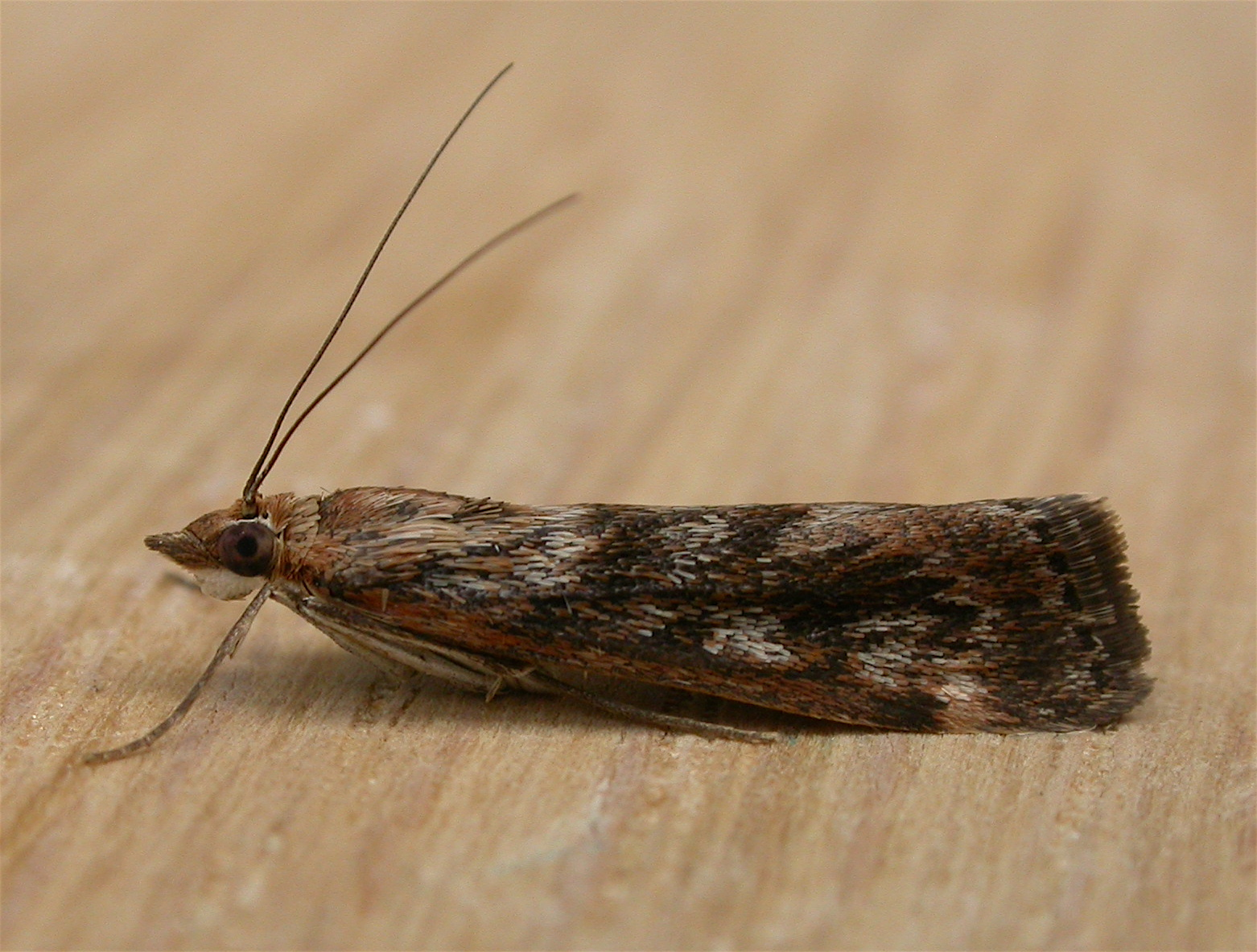
- Achyra affinitalis

Scientific classification
- Kingdom: Animalia
- Phylum: Arthropoda
- Clade: Pancrustacea
- Class: Insecta
- Order: Lepidoptera
- Family: Crambidae
- Subfamily: Pyraustinae
- Genus: Achyra; Guenée, 1849

Synonyms
- Achiria Sherborn, 1932; Achyria Sherborn, 1932; Dosara Walker, 1859; Eurycreon Lederer, 1863; Tritaea Meyrick, 1884

= Achyra (moth) =

Genus of moths

Achyra is a genus of moths of the family Crambidae described by Achille Guenée in 1849.

== Species ==
- Achyra affinitalis (Lederer, 1863)
- Achyra arida Maes, 2005
- Achyra bifidalis (Fabricius, 1794)
- Achyra brasiliensis Capps, 1967
- Achyra coelatalis (Walker, 1859)
- Achyra eneanalis (Schaus, 1923)
- Achyra imperialis (Sauber in Semper, 1899)
- Achyra llaguenalis Munroe, 1978
- Achyra massalis (Walker, 1859)
- Achyra nigrirenalis (Hampson, 1913)
- Achyra nudalis (Hübner, 1796)
- Achyra occidentalis (Packard, 1873)
- Achyra piuralis (Capps, 1967)
- Achyra prionogramma (Meyrick, 1886)
- Achyra protealis (Warren, 1892)
- Achyra rantalis (Guenée, 1854) – garden webworm moth
- Achyra serrulata (Turner, 1932)
- Achyra takowensis Maes, 1987

== Former species ==
- Achyra similalis Guenée, 1854
