= Hahncappsia conisphora =

Scientific classification
- Kingdom: Animalia
- Phylum: Arthropoda
- Class: Insecta
- Order: Lepidoptera
- Family: Crambidae
- Genus: Hahncappsia
- Species: H. conisphora

Binomial name
- Hahncappsia conisphora (Hampson, 1913)

Synonyms
- Phlyctaenodes conisphora Hampson, 1913

Species of moth

Hahncappsia conisphora is a moth in the family Crambidae. It was described by George Hampson in 1913. It is found in Guatemala, Costa Rica and Mexico.

The wingspan is about 22 mm for males and 24 mm for females. Adults have been recorded on wing from May to July.
