= Achyra serrulata =

Scientific classification
- Kingdom: Animalia
- Phylum: Arthropoda
- Clade: Pancrustacea
- Class: Insecta
- Order: Lepidoptera
- Family: Crambidae
- Genus: Achyra
- Species: A. serrulata

Binomial name
- Achyra serrulata (Turner, 1932)

Synonyms
- Metasia serrulata Turner, 1932

Species of moth

Achyra serrulata is a moth in the family Crambidae. It was described by Turner in 1932. It is found in Australia, where it has been recorded from Western Australia.
