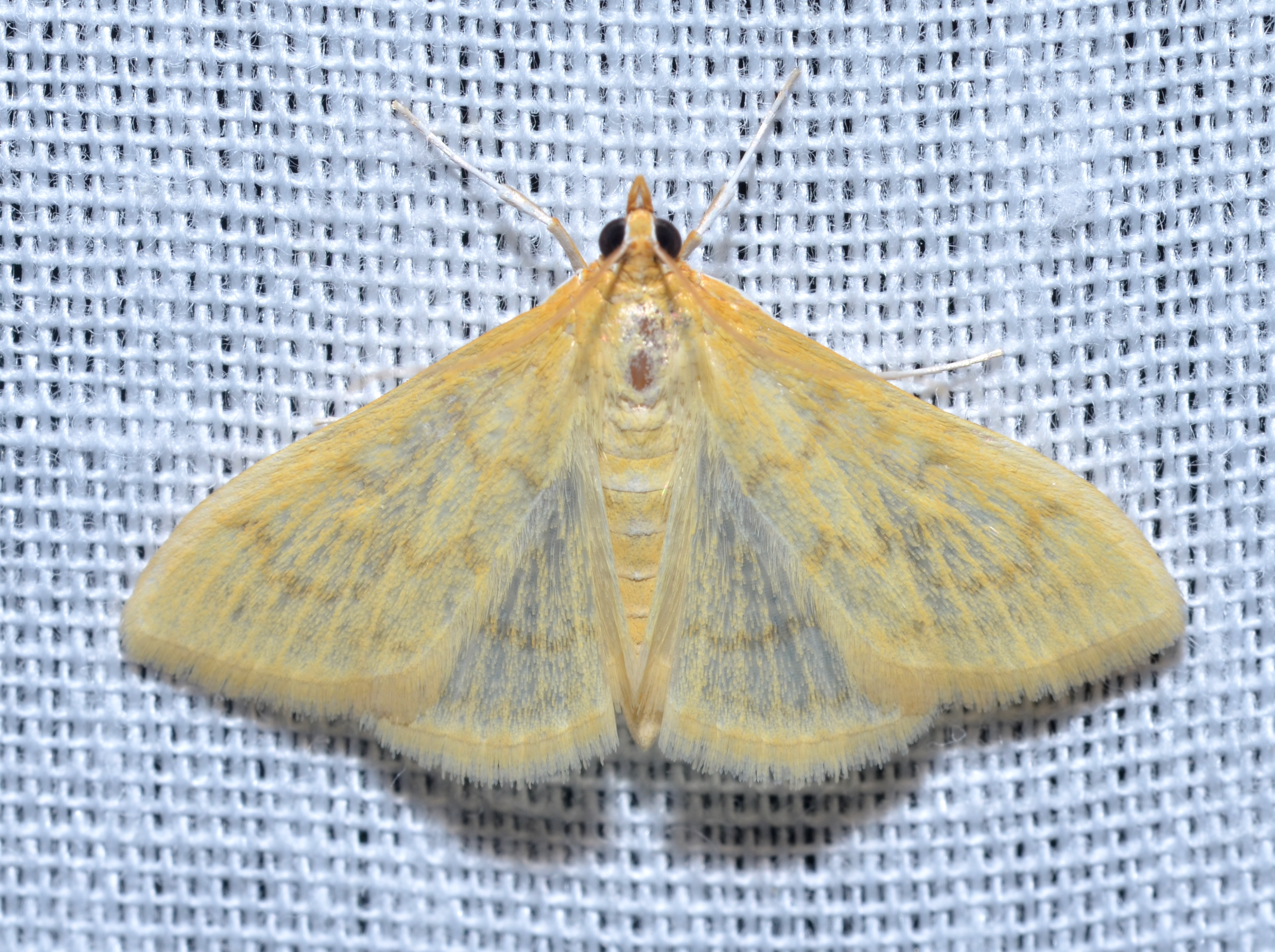
- Hahncappsia marculenta

Scientific classification
- Kingdom: Animalia
- Phylum: Arthropoda
- Class: Insecta
- Order: Lepidoptera
- Family: Crambidae
- Subfamily: Pyraustinae
- Genus: Hahncappsia; Munroe, 1976

= Hahncappsia =

Genus of moths

Hahncappsia is a genus of moths of the family Crambidae, and the order Lepidoptera.

== Species ==
- Hahncappsia alpinensis (Capps, 1967)
- Hahncappsia autocratoralis
- Hahncappsia cayugalis
- Hahncappsia chiapasalis
- Hahncappsia cochisensis (Capps, 1967)
- Hahncappsia coloradensis (Grote & Robinson, 1867)
- Hahncappsia conisphora (Hampson, 1913)
- Hahncappsia conisphoralis
- Hahncappsia corozalis
- Hahncappsia cynoalis (Druce, 1895)
- Hahncappsia ecuadoralis
- Hahncappsia entephrialis
- Hahncappsia fordi (Capps, 1967)
- Hahncappsia huachucalis (Capps, 1967)
- Hahncappsia jacalensis
- Hahncappsia jaliscalis
- Hahncappsia jaralis (Schaus, 1920)
- Hahncappsia lautalis
- Hahncappsia mancalis (Lederer, 1863)
- Hahncappsia mancaloides
- Hahncappsia marculenta (Grote & Robinson, 1867)
- Hahncappsia marialis
- Hahncappsia mellinialis (Druce, 1899)
- Hahncappsia neobliteralis (Capps, 1967)
- Hahncappsia neomarculenta (Capps, 1967)
- Hahncappsia neotropicalis
- Hahncappsia nigripes (Schaus, 1920)
- Hahncappsia pergilvalis (Hulst, 1886)
- Hahncappsia potosiensis
- Hahncappsia praxitalis (Druce, 1895)
- Hahncappsia pseudobliteralis (Capps, 1967)
- Hahncappsia purulhalis
- Hahncappsia ramsdenalis (Schaus, 1920)
- Hahncappsia sacculalis
- Hahncappsia spinalis
- Hahncappsia straminea
- Hahncappsia suarezalis
- Hahncappsia volcanensis
- Hahncappsia yucatanalis
