= Achyra llaguenalis =

Scientific classification
- Kingdom: Animalia
- Phylum: Arthropoda
- Clade: Pancrustacea
- Class: Insecta
- Order: Lepidoptera
- Family: Crambidae
- Genus: Achyra
- Species: A. llaguenalis

Binomial name
- Achyra llaguenalis Munroe, 1978

Species of moth

Achyra llaguenalis is a moth in the family Crambidae. It was described by Eugene G. Munroe in 1978. It is found in Peru.
