= Achyra prionogramma =

Scientific classification
- Kingdom: Animalia
- Phylum: Arthropoda
- Clade: Pancrustacea
- Class: Insecta
- Order: Lepidoptera
- Family: Crambidae
- Genus: Achyra
- Species: A. prionogramma

Binomial name
- Achyra prionogramma (Meyrick, 1886)

Synonyms
- Eurycreon prionogramma Meyrick, 1886

Species of moth

Achyra prionogramma is a moth in the family Crambidae. It was described by Edward Meyrick in 1886. It is found on New Guinea.
