= Hahncappsia autocratoralis =

Scientific classification
- Kingdom: Animalia
- Phylum: Arthropoda
- Class: Insecta
- Order: Lepidoptera
- Family: Crambidae
- Genus: Hahncappsia
- Species: H. autocratoralis

Binomial name
- Hahncappsia autocratoralis (Dyar, 1912)

Synonyms
- Loxostege autocratoralis Dyar, 1912

Species of moth

Hahncappsia autocratoralis is a moth in the family Crambidae. It is found in Mexico (Federal District, Morelos, Veracruz, San Luis Potosí, Michoacan, Chiapas).

The wingspan is 20–24 mm for males and 18–25 mm for females. Adults have been recorded on wing from May to June.
