= Achyra takowensis =

Scientific classification
- Kingdom: Animalia
- Phylum: Arthropoda
- Clade: Pancrustacea
- Class: Insecta
- Order: Lepidoptera
- Family: Crambidae
- Genus: Achyra
- Species: A. takowensis

Binomial name
- Achyra takowensis Maes, 1987

Species of moth

Achyra takowensis is a moth in the family Crambidae. It was described by Koen V. N. Maes in 1987. It is endemic to Taiwan.
