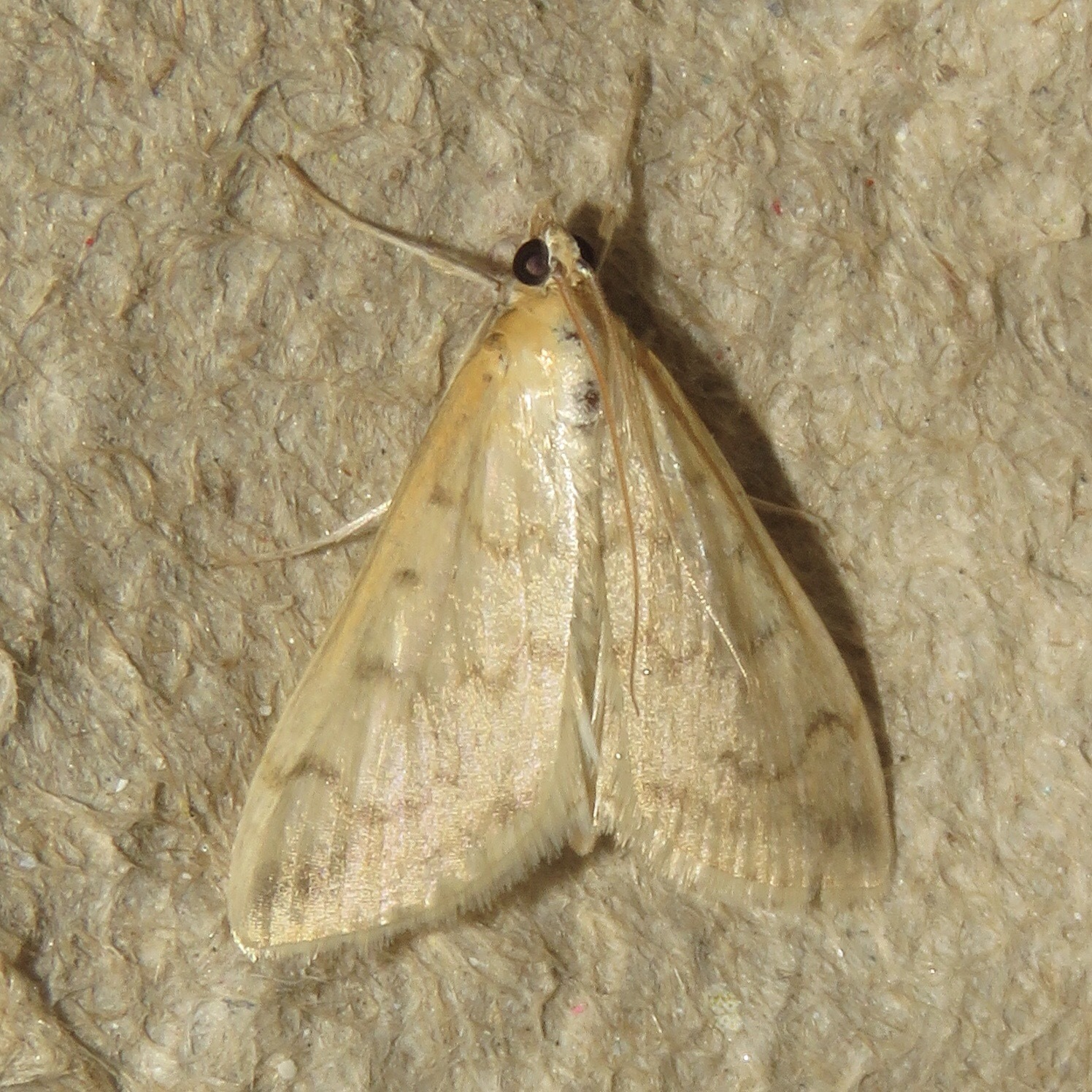

Scientific classification
- Kingdom: Animalia
- Phylum: Arthropoda
- Clade: Pancrustacea
- Class: Insecta
- Order: Lepidoptera
- Family: Crambidae
- Genus: Hahncappsia
- Species: H. pergilvalis

Binomial name
- Hahncappsia pergilvalis (Hulst, 1886)

Synonyms
- Botis pergilvalis Hulst, 1886; Loxostege pergilvalis

= Hahncappsia pergilvalis =

Species of moth

Hahncappsia pergilvalis is a moth in the family Crambidae. It was described by George Duryea Hulst in 1886. It is found in North America, where it has been recorded from Ontario and the north-eastern and south-western United States. It is also present in Mexico, where it has been recorded from the Federal District, Puebla and Jalisco.

The wingspan is 20–26 mm. Adults have been recorded on wing from May to September.

The larvae possibly feed on Zea mays (maize or corn).
