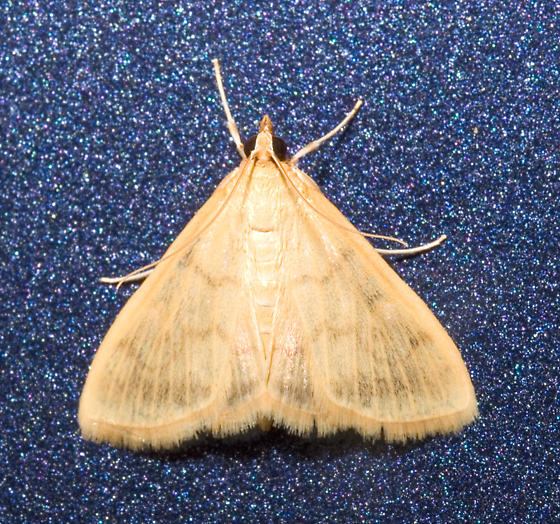

Scientific classification
- Domain: Eukaryota
- Kingdom: Animalia
- Phylum: Arthropoda
- Class: Insecta
- Order: Lepidoptera
- Family: Crambidae
- Genus: Hahncappsia
- Species: H. mancalis

Binomial name
- Hahncappsia mancalis (Lederer, 1863)

Synonyms
- Botys mancalis Lederer, 1863

= Hahncappsia mancalis =

Species of moth

Hahncappsia mancalis is a moth of the family Crambidae described by Julius Lederer in 1863. It is found from Maryland to Illinois, south to Florida, Texas and Arizona and further south to Mexico and Costa Rica.

The wingspan is about 18 mm.

The larvae feed on Amaranthus retroflexus, Mentha, Ipomoea, Nicotiana and Rumex.
