= Haimbachia aculeata =

Scientific classification
- Kingdom: Animalia
- Phylum: Arthropoda
- Class: Insecta
- Order: Lepidoptera
- Family: Crambidae
- Subfamily: Crambinae
- Tribe: Haimbachiini
- Genus: Haimbachia
- Species: H. aculeata

Binomial name
- Haimbachia aculeata (Hampson, 1903)

Synonyms
- Diatroea aculeata Hampson, 1903

Species of moth

Haimbachia aculeata is a moth in the family Crambidae. It was described by George Hampson in 1903. It is found in the Indian state of Sikkim and in South Africa.
