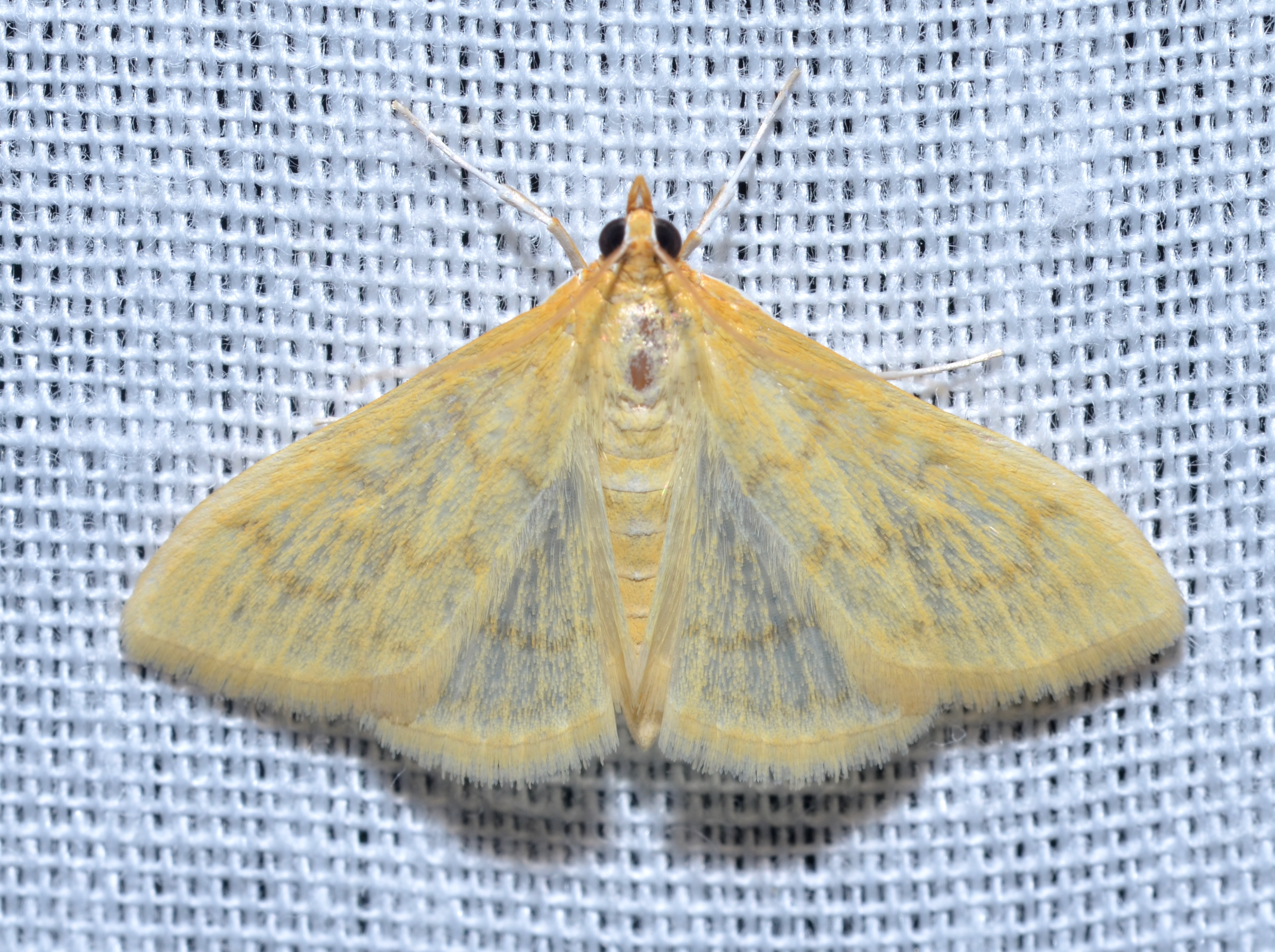

Scientific classification
- Domain: Eukaryota
- Kingdom: Animalia
- Phylum: Arthropoda
- Class: Insecta
- Order: Lepidoptera
- Family: Crambidae
- Genus: Hahncappsia
- Species: H. marculenta

Binomial name
- Hahncappsia marculenta (Grote & Robinson, 1867)

Synonyms
- Botys marculenta Grote & Robinson, 1867; Loxostege marculenta

= Hahncappsia marculenta =

Species of moth

Hahncappsia marculenta is a moth in the family Crambidae. It was described by Augustus Radcliffe Grote and Coleman Townsend Robinson in 1867. It is found in North America, where it is widespread east of the Rocky Mountains.

The wingspan is 18–24 mm for males and 21–26 mm for females. The forewings are pale yellow with luteous (muddy-yellow) markings. The hindwings are paler yellow. Adults have been recorded on wing from May to September.

The larvae feed on Ambrosia trifida and Solidago species.
