= Achyra bifidalis =

Scientific classification
- Kingdom: Animalia
- Phylum: Arthropoda
- Clade: Pancrustacea
- Class: Insecta
- Order: Lepidoptera
- Family: Crambidae
- Genus: Achyra
- Species: A. bifidalis

Binomial name
- Achyra bifidalis (Fabricius, 1794)

Synonyms
- Phalaena bifidalis Fabricius, 1794; Eurycreon evanidalis Berg, 1875; Eurycreon obsoletalis Berg, 1875; Loxostege stolidalis Schaus, 1940; Phalaena centralis Fabricius, 1794; Phlyctaenodes inornatalis Walker, 1866; Phlyctaenodes orbitalis Hampson 1899 (nec Felder & Rogenhofer 1875)

Species of moth

Achyra bifidalis is a moth in the family Crambidae. It was described by Johan Christian Fabricius in 1794. It is found from the southern United States (from Arizona to Florida) south through Mexico to Brazil and Argentina. It is also found in the West Indies.

The wingspan is 20–24 millimetres (0.79–0.94 in).

The larvae feed on Gossypium and Portulaca species. They reach a length of 24–27 mm.
