= Hahncappsia straminea =

Scientific classification
- Kingdom: Animalia
- Phylum: Arthropoda
- Class: Insecta
- Order: Lepidoptera
- Family: Crambidae
- Genus: Hahncappsia
- Species: H. straminea

Binomial name
- Hahncappsia straminea (Hampson, 1913)

Synonyms
- Loxostege venadialis Capps, 1967

Species of moth

Hahncappsia straminea is a moth in the family Crambidae. It is found in Mexico.

The wingspan is about 32 mm for males and 27–31 mm for females.
