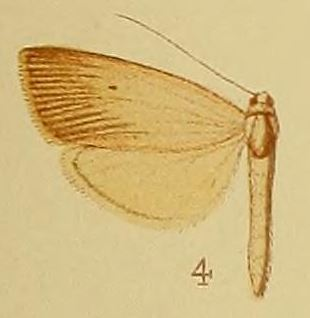

Scientific classification
- Kingdom: Animalia
- Phylum: Arthropoda
- Class: Insecta
- Order: Lepidoptera
- Family: Crambidae
- Subfamily: Crambinae
- Tribe: Haimbachiini
- Genus: Haimbachia
- Species: H. fuscicilia

Binomial name
- Haimbachia fuscicilia (Hampson, 1910)

Synonyms
- Chilo fuscicilia Hampson, 1910

= Haimbachia fuscicilia =

Species of moth

Haimbachia fuscicilia is a moth in the family Crambidae. It was described by George Hampson in 1910. It is found in Zambia.
