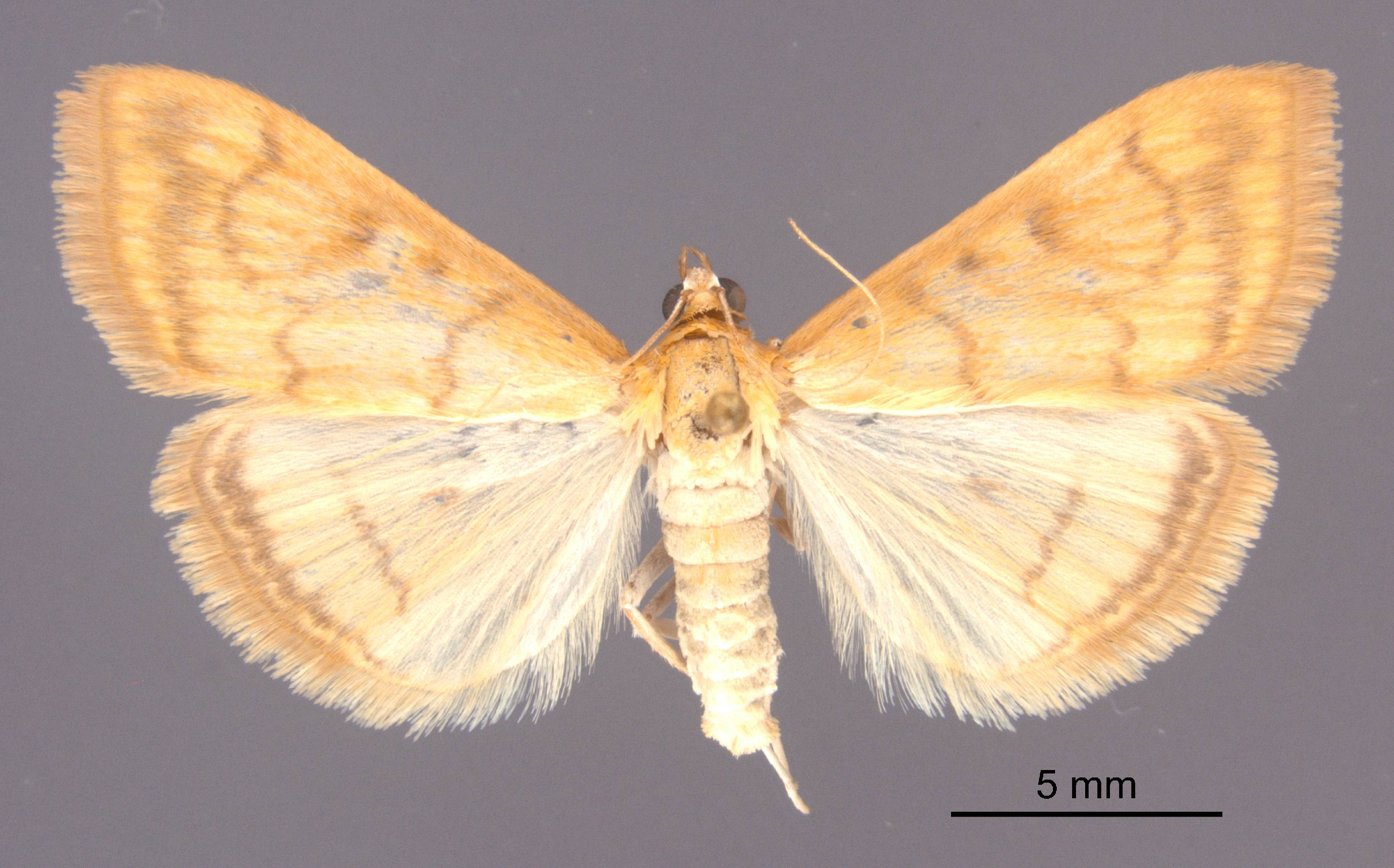

Scientific classification
- Kingdom: Animalia
- Phylum: Arthropoda
- Clade: Pancrustacea
- Class: Insecta
- Order: Lepidoptera
- Family: Crambidae
- Genus: Hahncappsia
- Species: H. coloradensis

Binomial name
- Hahncappsia coloradensis (Grote & Robinson, 1867)

Synonyms
- Botys coloradensis Grote & Robinson, 1867

= Hahncappsia coloradensis =

Species of moth

Hahncappsia coloradensis is a moth in the family Crambidae. It was described by Augustus Radcliffe Grote and Coleman Townsend Robinson in 1867. It is found in North America, where it has been recorded from Iowa to Utah, Colorado, Texas and Arizona.

The wingspan is 23–31 mm for males and 27–31 mm for females. The forewings are whitish with a slight ochreous tinge. The hindwings are whitish. Adults have been recorded on wing from April to September.

The larvae feed on Helianthus species.
