= Hahncappsia jaralis =

Scientific classification
- Domain: Eukaryota
- Kingdom: Animalia
- Phylum: Arthropoda
- Class: Insecta
- Order: Lepidoptera
- Family: Crambidae
- Genus: Hahncappsia
- Species: H. jaralis

Binomial name
- Hahncappsia jaralis (Schaus, 1920)

Synonyms
- Phlyctaeonodes jaralis Schaus, 1920

Species of moth

Hahncappsia jaralis is a moth in the family Crambidae. It was described by William Schaus in 1920. It is found in the United States in southern Arizona and in Mexico in Oaxaca, Puebla, Jalisco and San Luis Potosí.

The wingspan is about 23 mm for males and 23–25 mm for females. Adults have been recorded on wing from May to July.
