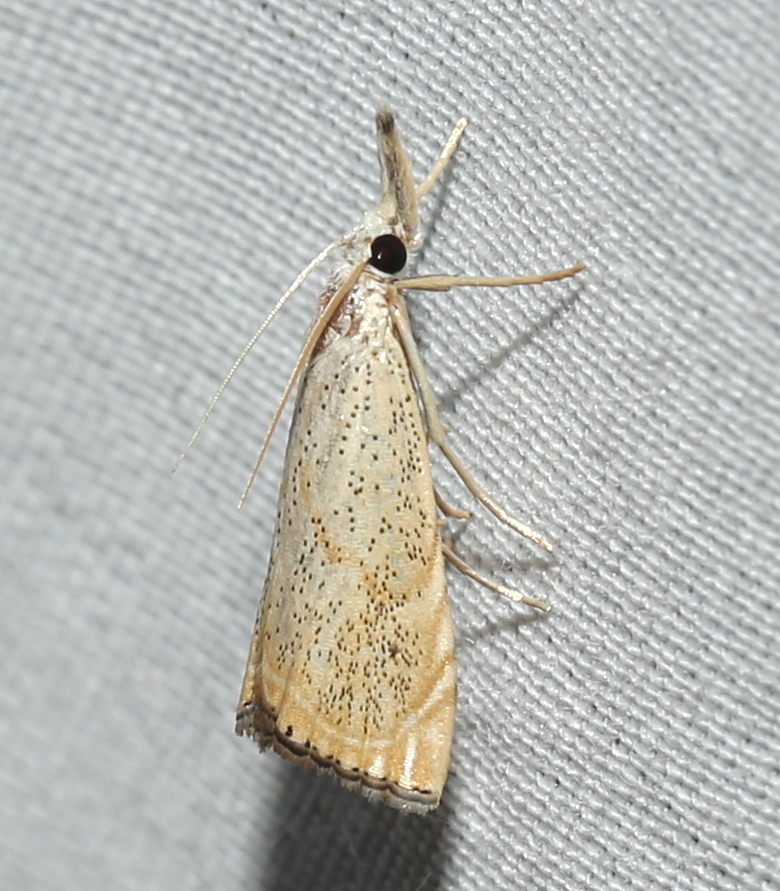

Scientific classification
- Kingdom: Animalia
- Phylum: Arthropoda
- Class: Insecta
- Order: Lepidoptera
- Family: Crambidae
- Subfamily: Crambinae
- Tribe: Haimbachiini
- Genus: Haimbachia
- Species: H. placidellus

Binomial name
- Haimbachia placidellus (Haimbach, 1907)

Synonyms
- Crambus placidellus Haimbach, 1907; Haimbachia placidella

= Haimbachia placidellus =

Species of moth

Haimbachia placidellus, the peppered haimbachia moth, is a moth in the family Crambidae. It was described by Frank Haimbach in 1907. It is found in North America, where it has been recorded from New York and Massachusetts to South Carolina, west to Tennessee.

The larvae probably feed on grasses.
