= Haimbachia maroniella =

Scientific classification
- Domain: Eukaryota
- Kingdom: Animalia
- Phylum: Arthropoda
- Class: Insecta
- Order: Lepidoptera
- Family: Crambidae
- Subfamily: Crambinae
- Tribe: Haimbachiini
- Genus: Haimbachia
- Species: H. maroniella

Binomial name
- Haimbachia maroniella Dyar & Heinrich, 1927

Synonyms
- Haimbachia maronialis Munroe, 1995

Species of moth

Haimbachia maroniella is a moth in the family Crambidae. It was described by Harrison Gray Dyar Jr. and Carl Heinrich in 1927. It is found in French Guiana.
