= Achyra nigrirenalis =

Scientific classification
- Kingdom: Animalia
- Phylum: Arthropoda
- Clade: Pancrustacea
- Class: Insecta
- Order: Lepidoptera
- Family: Crambidae
- Genus: Achyra
- Species: A. nigrirenalis

Binomial name
- Achyra nigrirenalis (Hampson, 1913)

Synonyms
- Phlyctaenodes nigrirenalis Hampson, 1913

Species of moth

Achyra nigrirenalis is a moth in the family Crambidae. It was described by George Hampson in 1913. It is found in Australia, where it has been recorded from Western Australia, the Northern Territory, Queensland and South Australia.

The wingspan is about 25 millimetres (0.98 in). The forewings have a light and dark brown pattern. The hindwings are uniform pale brown.
