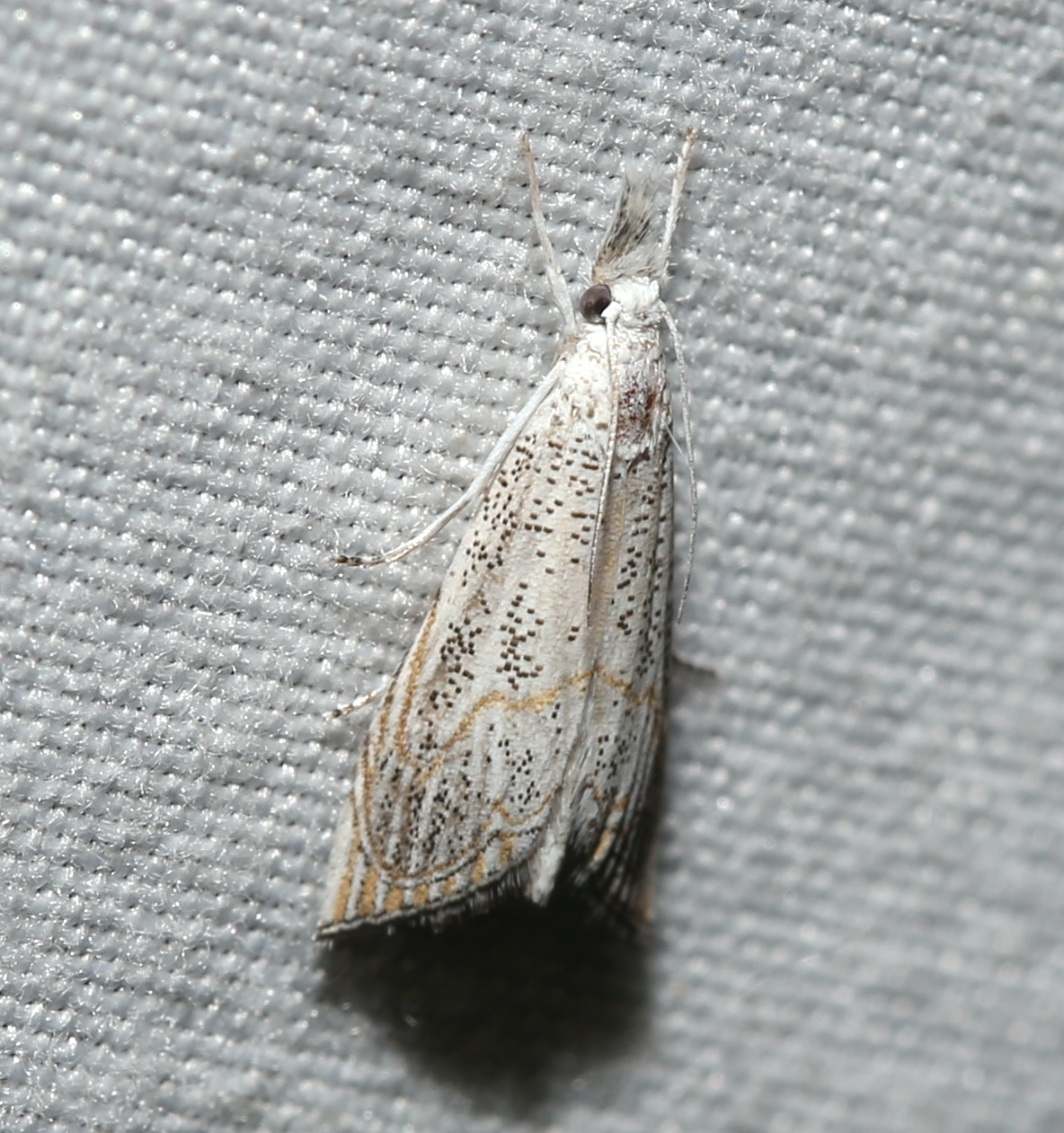

Scientific classification
- Kingdom: Animalia
- Phylum: Arthropoda
- Clade: Pancrustacea
- Class: Insecta
- Order: Lepidoptera
- Family: Crambidae
- Subfamily: Crambinae
- Tribe: Haimbachiini
- Genus: Haimbachia
- Species: H. squamulella

Binomial name
- Haimbachia squamulella (Zeller, 1881)

Synonyms
- Chilo squamulella Zeller, 1881; Haimbachia squamulellus

= Haimbachia squamulella =

Species of moth

Haimbachia squamulella is a moth in the family Crambidae. It was described by Zeller in 1881. It is found in North America, where it has been recorded from Maryland to Florida and Texas, west to Illinois.

The wingspan is about 16 mm. Adults are on wing from June to July.
