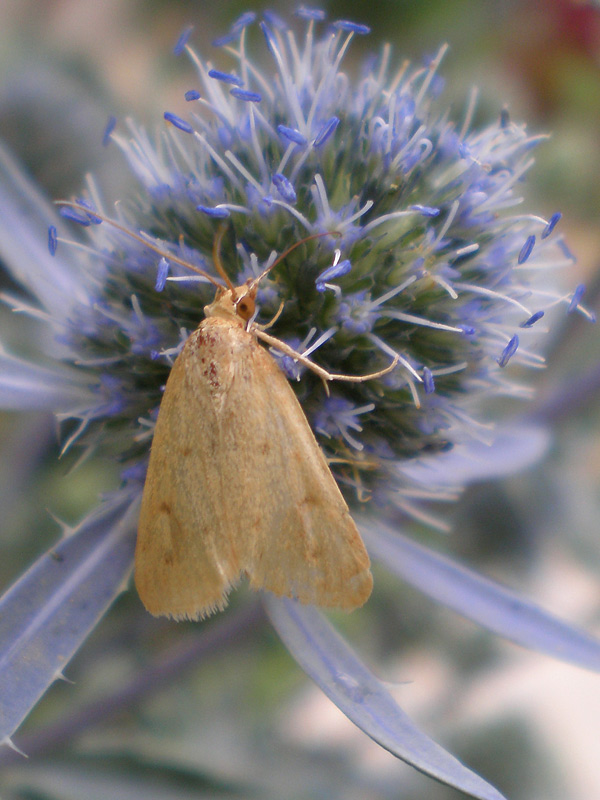

Scientific classification
- Domain: Eukaryota
- Kingdom: Animalia
- Phylum: Arthropoda
- Class: Insecta
- Order: Lepidoptera
- Family: Crambidae
- Genus: Achyra
- Species: A. nudalis

Binomial name
- Achyra nudalis (Hübner, 1796)

Synonyms
- Pyralis nudalis Hübner, 1796; Achyra nodalis Gundlach, 1891; Botys lacunalis Zeller, 1852; Aplographe fulvalis Warren, 1892; Pionea xanthalis Fawcett, 1916; Loxostege nudalis var. brunnealis Caradja, 1916; Nymphula bipunctalis Duponchel, 1831; Nymphula unipunctalis Duponchel, 1831; Nymphula pauciferalis Walker, 1866; Phlyctaenodes kronei Schawerda, 1914; Phlyctaenodes serenalis Schawerda, 1916; Pyralis interpunctalis Hübner, 1796; Loxostege nudalis var. sepialis Caradja, 1935

= Achyra nudalis =

Species of moth

Achyra nudalis is a moth of the family Crambidae. It was described by Jacob Hübner in 1796. It is found from southern Europe east to India and Mongolia. It has also been recorded from Yemen, Niger, Saudi Arabia and South Africa.
