= Haimbachia lunilinealis =

Scientific classification
- Kingdom: Animalia
- Phylum: Arthropoda
- Class: Insecta
- Order: Lepidoptera
- Family: Crambidae
- Subfamily: Crambinae
- Tribe: Haimbachiini
- Genus: Haimbachia
- Species: H. lunilinealis

Binomial name
- Haimbachia lunilinealis (Hampson, 1919)

Synonyms
- Diatraea lunilinealis Hampson, 1919

Species of moth

Haimbachia lunilinealis is a moth in the family Crambidae. It was described by George Hampson in 1919. It is found in Sri Lanka.
