= Haimbachia albiceps =

Scientific classification
- Kingdom: Animalia
- Phylum: Arthropoda
- Class: Insecta
- Order: Lepidoptera
- Family: Crambidae
- Genus: Haimbachia
- Species: H. albiceps

Binomial name
- Haimbachia albiceps (Hampson, 1919)

Synonyms
- Argyria albiceps Hampson, 1919; Diatraea metaphaealis Hampson, 1919

Species of moth

Haimbachia albiceps is a moth in the family Crambidae. It was described by George Hampson in 1919. It is found in South Africa.
