= Hahncappsia spinalis =

Scientific classification
- Domain: Eukaryota
- Kingdom: Animalia
- Phylum: Arthropoda
- Class: Insecta
- Order: Lepidoptera
- Family: Crambidae
- Genus: Hahncappsia
- Species: H. spinalis

Binomial name
- Hahncappsia spinalis (Amsel, 1956)

Synonyms
- Loxostege spinalis Amsel, 1956

Species of moth

Hahncappsia spinalis is a moth in the family Crambidae. It is found in Venezuela.
