= Haimbachia hampsoni =

Scientific classification
- Domain: Eukaryota
- Kingdom: Animalia
- Phylum: Arthropoda
- Class: Insecta
- Order: Lepidoptera
- Family: Crambidae
- Subfamily: Crambinae
- Tribe: Haimbachiini
- Genus: Haimbachia
- Species: H. hampsoni

Binomial name
- Haimbachia hampsoni (Kapur, 1950)

Synonyms
- Coniesta hampsoni Kapur, 1950

Species of moth

Haimbachia hampsoni is a moth in the family Crambidae. It was described by A. P. Kapur in 1950. It is found in India.
