= Achyra eneanalis =

Scientific classification
- Kingdom: Animalia
- Phylum: Arthropoda
- Clade: Pancrustacea
- Class: Insecta
- Order: Lepidoptera
- Family: Crambidae
- Genus: Achyra
- Species: A. eneanalis

Binomial name
- Achyra eneanalis (Schaus, 1923)

Synonyms
- Pyrausta eneanalis Schaus, 1923

Species of moth

Achyra eneanalis is a moth in the family Crambidae. It was described by Schaus in 1923. It is found on the Galapagos Islands.
