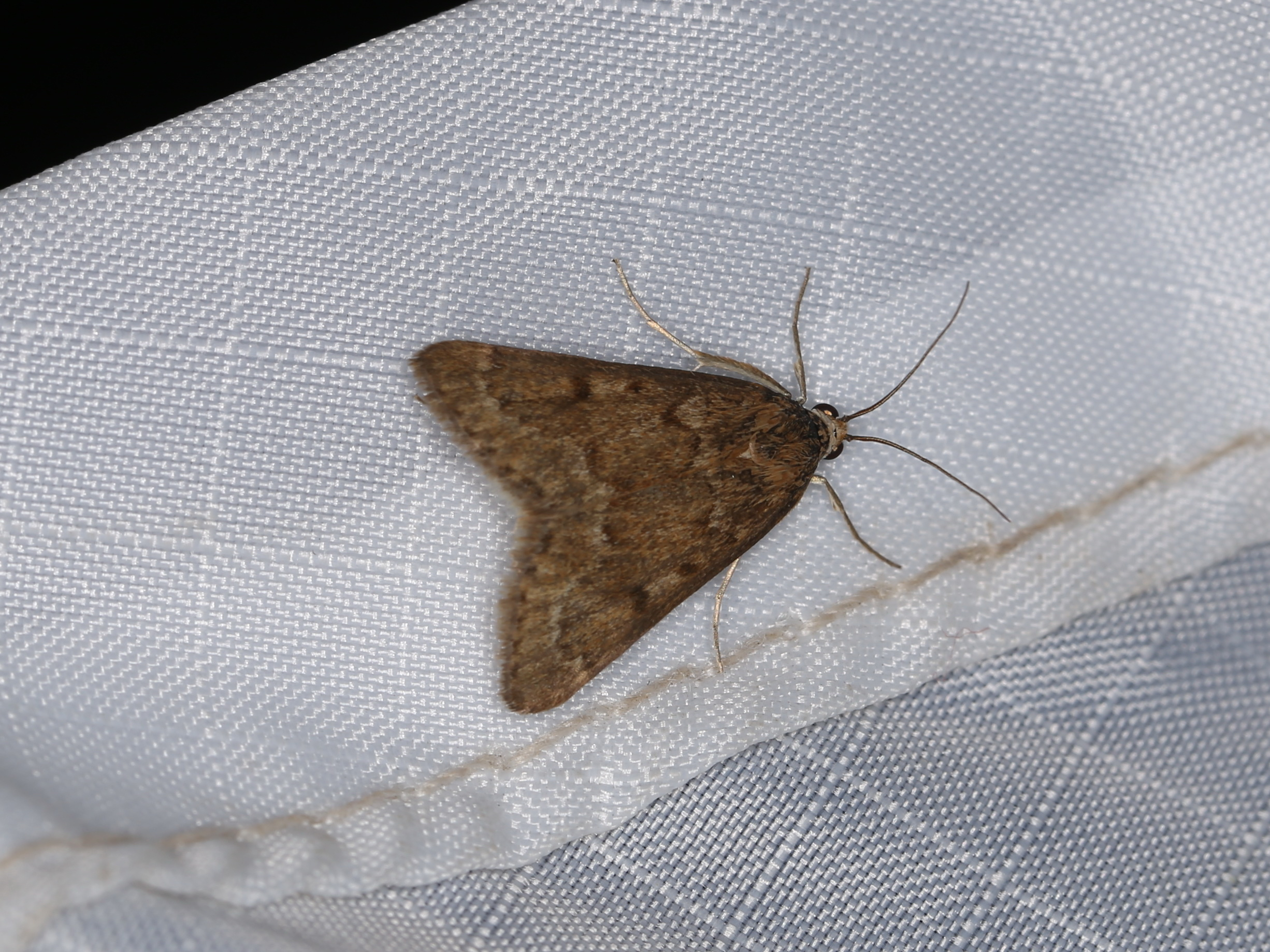

Scientific classification
- Kingdom: Animalia
- Phylum: Arthropoda
- Clade: Pancrustacea
- Class: Insecta
- Order: Lepidoptera
- Family: Crambidae
- Genus: Achyra
- Species: A. occidentalis

Binomial name
- Achyra occidentalis (Packard, 1873)

Synonyms
- Scopula occidentalis Packard, 1873

= Achyra occidentalis =

Species of moth

Achyra occidentalis is a moth in the family Crambidae. It was described by Packard in 1873. It is found in North America, where it has been recorded from Arizona, California and Nevada.

The length of the forewings is 10–12 millimetres (0.39–0.47 in). There are two forms, a dark and pale form. Adults of the dark form are on wing from March to April, while those of the pale form are on wing from June to August.
