= Neohelvibotys oxalis =

Scientific classification
- Domain: Eukaryota
- Kingdom: Animalia
- Phylum: Arthropoda
- Class: Insecta
- Order: Lepidoptera
- Family: Crambidae
- Genus: Neohelvibotys
- Species: N. oxalis

Binomial name
- Neohelvibotys oxalis (J. F. G. Clarke, 1965)

Synonyms
- Loxostege oxalis J. F. G. Clarke, 1965

Species of moth

Neohelvibotys oxalis is a moth in the family Crambidae. It is found on the Juan Fernandez Islands.
