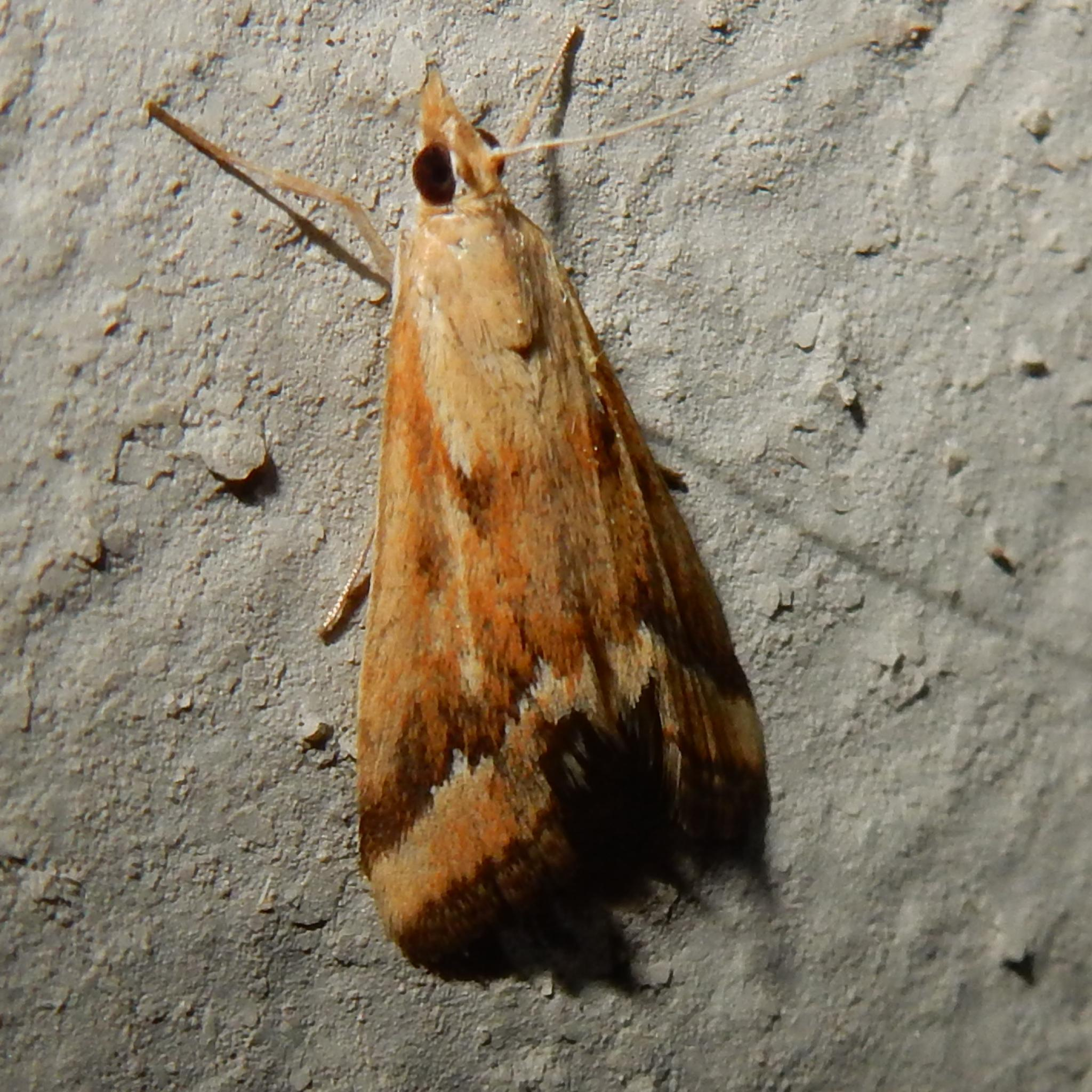

Scientific classification
- Kingdom: Animalia
- Phylum: Arthropoda
- Clade: Pancrustacea
- Class: Insecta
- Order: Lepidoptera
- Family: Crambidae
- Genus: Achyra
- Species: A. coelatalis

Binomial name
- Achyra coelatalis (Walker, 1859)

Synonyms
- Dosara coelatalis Walker, 1859; Sceliodes nodiferalis Gaede, 1917

= Achyra coelatalis =

Species of moth

Achyra coelatalis is a species of moth in the family Crambidae. It was described by Francis Walker in 1859. It is found in Botswana, the Democratic Republic of the Congo, Ghana, Kenya, Réunion, Lesotho, Madagascar, Namibia, Niger, the Seychelles, South Africa, Tanzania, Zambia, Zimbabwe, Australia, India and Sri Lanka.

The larvae have been recorded feeding on Sorghum species, Oryza sativa, Pennisetum americanum and Zea mays.
