= Hahn William Capps =

American entomologist

- Born: December 16, 1903
- Died: September 14, 1998 (aged 94)
- Education: University of Kansas
- Scientific career
- Fields: Entomology
- Workplaces: United States Department of Agriculture; Bureau of Entomology; Plant Quarantine

Hahn William Capps (December 16, 1903 – September 14, 1998) was an American entomologist.

== Biography ==
Capps was born in 1903. In 1929, he received his bachelor's degree from the University of Kansas. In 1930, he joined the United States Department of Agriculture, and the same year became plant quarantine inspector for the Bureau of Entomology and Plant Quarantine. In 1938, he became an assistant entomologist, and by 1940 he was made an entomologist. He kept the position until he retired in 1964. He studied larval and adult stages of Lepidoptera.
