= List of moths of Malawi =

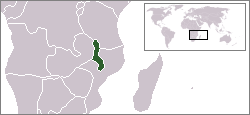
Location of Malawi

There are about 760 known moth species of Malawi. The moths (mostly nocturnal) and butterflies (mostly diurnal) together make up the taxonomic order Lepidoptera. They are listed alphabetically by family.

This is a list of moth species which have been recorded in Malawi.

== Adelidae ==
- Ceromitia glandularis Meyrick, 1908

== Anomoeotidae ==
- Thermochrous exigua Talbot, 1932
- Thermochrous melanoneura Hampson, 1920

== Arctiidae ==
- Acantharctia aurivillii Bartel, 1903
- Acantharctia lacteata Rothschild, 1933
- Acantharctia nigrivena Rothschild, 1935
- Acantharctia tenuifasciata Hampson, 1910
- Acanthofrontia dicycla Hampson, 1918
- Afrowatsonius marginalis (Walker, 1855)
- Agylla complanodes Hampson, 1901
- Alpenus investigatorum (Karsch, 1898)
- Alpenus nigropunctata (Bethune-Baker, 1908)
- Amata cerbera (Linnaeus, 1764)
- Amata ceres (Oberthür, 1878)
- Amerila affinis (Rothschild, 1910)
- Amerila bubo (Walker, 1855)
- Amerila carneola (Hampson, 1916)
- Amerila puella (Fabricius, 1793)
- Amphicallia bellatrix (Dalman, 1823)
- Amphicallia thelwalli (Druce, 1882)
- Amsacta grammiphlebia Hampson, 1901
- Amsacta latimarginalis Rothschild, 1933
- Amsacta marginalis Walker, 1855
- Anaemosia albida Hampson, 1918
- Apisa grisescens (Dufrane, 1945)
- Apisa rendalli Rothschild, 1910
- Apothosia conformis Hampson, 1918
- Archilema uelleburgensis (Strand, 1912)
- Archithosia costimacula (Mabille, 1878)
- Argina amanda (Boisduval, 1847)
- Argina leonina (Walker, 1865)
- Binna penicillata Walker, 1865
- Carcinopodia furcifasciata (Butler, 1895)
- Caripodia consimilis Hampson, 1918
- Ctenosia nephelistis Hampson, 1918
- Cyana nyasica (Hampson, 1918)
- Cyana pretoriae (Distant, 1897)
- Cyana rejecta (Walker, 1854)
- Eilema albuliferella Strand, 1922
- Eilema aurantisquamata (Hampson, 1918)
- Eilema nebuliferella Strand, 1922
- Eilema sanguicosta (Hampson, 1901)
- Estigmene trivitta (Walker, 1855)
- Eurozonosia atricincta Hampson, 1918
- Eurozonosia inconstans (Butler, 1896)
- Eyralpenus diplosticta (Hampson, 1900)
- Eyralpenus inconspicua (Rothschild, 1910)
- Eyralpenus melanocera (Hampson, 1916)
- Galtara aurivilii (Pagenstecher, 1901)
- Galtara doriae (Oberthür, 1880)
- Ilemodes heterogyna Hampson, 1900
- Ischnarctia brunnescens Bartel, 1903
- Karschiola holoclera (Karsch, 1894)
- Lepidilema unipectinata Aurivillius, 1910
- Lepista pandula (Boisduval, 1847)
- Macrosia chalybeata Hampson, 1901
- Metarctia collocalia Kiriakoff, 1957
- Metarctia hebenoides (Kiriakoff, 1973)
- Metarctia lateritia Herrich-Schäffer, 1855
- Metarctia rubra (Walker, 1856)
- Micralarctia punctulatum (Wallengren, 1860)
- Nyctemera apicalis (Walker, 1854)
- Nyctemera itokina (Aurivillius, 1904)
- Nyctemera leuconoe Hopffer, 1857
- Ochrota nyassa (Strand, 1912)
- Paralacydes ramosa (Hampson, 1907)
- Pelosia plumosa (Mabille, 1900)
- Poecilarctia venata Aurivillius, 1921
- Pseudlepista holoxantha Hampson, 1918
- Pseudmelisa rubrosignata Kiriakoff, 1957
- Pusiola holoxantha (Hampson, 1918)
- Pusiola nyassana (Strand, 1912)
- Pusiola ochreata (Hampson, 1901)
- Secusio mania Druce, 1887
- Secusio strigata Walker, 1854
- Spilosoma baxteri (Rothschild, 1910)
- Spilosoma bipartita Rothschild, 1933
- Spilosoma karschi Bartel, 1903
- Spilosoma lineata Walker, 1855
- Spilosoma nigrocastanea (Rothschild, 1917)
- Spilosoma nyasana Rothschild, 1933
- Spilosoma nyasica (Hampson, 1911)
- Stenilema aurantiaca Hampson, 1909
- Stenilema subaurantiaca Strand, 1912
- Teracotona euprepia Hampson, 1900
- Teracotona mirabilis Bartel, 1903
- Teracotona trifasciata Bartel, 1903
- Thumatha inconstans (Butler, 1897)
- Thyretes negus Oberthür, 1878
- Thyrogonia cyaneotincta Hampson, 1918
- Utetheisa pulchella (Linnaeus, 1758)

== Coleophoridae ==
- Holcocera lignyodes (Meyrick, 1914)

== Cosmopterigidae ==
- Macrobathra proxena Meyrick, 1914

== Cossidae ==
- Alophonotus rauana
- Azygophleps inclusa (Walker, 1856)
- Brachylia nussi Yakovlev, 2011
- Eulophonotus stephania
- Macrocossus grebennikovi Yakovlev, 2013
- Meharia murphyi Yakovlev, 2013
- Oreocossus occidentalis
- Phragmataecia innominata Dalla Torre, 1923
- Phragmataecia irrorata Hampson, 1910
- Strigocossus elephas Yakovlev, 2013
- Strigocossus moderatus (Walker, 1856)
- Strigocossus capensis (Walker, 1856)
- Xyleutes stephania (Druce, 1887)

== Crambidae ==
- Adelpherupa albescens Hampson, 1919
- Adelpherupa flavescens Hampson, 1919
- Agathodes musivalis Guenée, 1854
- Aurotalis delicatalis (Hampson, 1919)
- Bissetia poliella (Hampson, 1919)
- Cadarena sinuata (Fabricius, 1781)
- Calamoschoena stictalis Hampson, 1919
- Charltona atrifascialis Hampson, 1919
- Chilo argyropasta (Hampson, 1919)
- Chilo costifusalis (Hampson, 1919)
- Chilo orichalcociliella (Strand, 1911)
- Classeya bicuspidalis (Hampson, 1919)
- Conotalis nigroradians (Mabille, 1900)
- Cotachena smaragdina (Butler, 1875)
- Crambus brachiiferus Hampson, 1919
- Crambus brunneisquamatus Hampson, 1919
- Crambus diarhabdellus Hampson, 1919
- Crambus microstrigatus Hampson, 1919
- Crambus monostictus Hampson, 1919
- Crambus neurellus Hampson, 1919
- Crambus vittiterminellus Hampson, 1919
- Donacoscaptes flavilinealis (Hampson, 1919)
- Euclasta varii Popescu-Gorj & Constantinescu, 1973
- Haimbachia rufifusalis (Hampson, 1919)
- Haimbachia rufistrigalis (Hampson, 1919)
- Heliothela ophideresana (Walker, 1863)
- Nomophila noctuella ([Denis & Schiffermüller], 1775)
- Orphanostigma excisa (Martin, 1956)
- Orphanostigma fervidalis (Zeller, 1852)
- Ostrinia erythrialis (Hampson, 1913)
- Parancyla argyrothysana Hampson, 1919
- Parapoynx stagnalis (Zeller, 1852)
- Parerupa undilinealis (Hampson, 1919)
- Patissa fulvicepsalis Hampson, 1919
- Patissa geminalis Hampson, 1919
- Patissa rubrilinealis Hampson, 1919
- Patissa termipunctalis (Hampson, 1919)
- Prionotalis peracutella Hampson, 1919
- Prochoristis calamochroa (Hampson, 1919)
- Pyrausta distictalis Hampson, 1918
- Sebrus perdentellus (Hampson, 1919)

== Drepanidae ==
- Gonoreta subtilis (Bryk, 1913)
- Negera unispinosa Watson, 1965

== Elachistidae ==
- Elachista chelonitis Meyrick, 1909
- Elachista semophanta Meyrick, 1914

== Eupterotidae ==
- Hibrildes crawshayi Butler, 1896
- Hibrildes norax Druce, 1887
- Hoplojana tripunctata (Aurivillius, 1897)
- Janomima dannfelti (Aurivillius, 1893)
- Stenoglene bipunctatus (Aurivillius, 1909)
- Stenoglene obtusus (Walker, 1864)
- Stenoglene roseus (Druce, 1886)

== Geometridae ==
- Acollesis mimetica Prout, 1915
- Antozola dislocata Herbulot, 1992
- Asthenotricha serraticornis Warren, 1902
- Biston stringeri (Prout, 1938)
- Callioratis abraxas Felder, 1874
- Cartaletis libyssa (Hopffer, 1857)
- Cartaletis nigricosta (Prout, 1916)
- Chiasmia getula (Wallengren, 1872)
- Chiasmia inconspicua (Warren, 1897)
- Chiasmia infabricata (Prout, 1934)
- Chiasmia johnstoni (Butler, 1893)
- Chiasmia kilimanjarensis (Holland, 1892)
- Chiasmia majestica (Warren, 1901)
- Chiasmia parallacta (Warren, 1897)
- Chiasmia procidata (Guenée, 1858)
- Chiasmia rhabdophora (Holland, 1892)
- Chiasmia subcurvaria (Mabille, 1897)
- Chiasmia umbratilis (Butler, 1875)
- Chloroclystis consocer Prout, 1937
- Chloroclystis muscosa (Warren, 1902)
- Chrysocraspeda zombensis (Prout, 1932)
- Cleora munda (Warren, 1899)
- Cleora rostella D. S. Fletcher, 1967
- Cleora thyris D. S. Fletcher, 1967
- Cophophlebia olivata Warren, 1897
- Derambila delostigma Prout, 1915
- Derambila hyperphyes (Prout, 1911)
- Dithecodes ornithospila (Prout, 1911)
- Drepanogynis unilineata (Warren, 1897)
- Ectropis gozmanyi D. S. Fletcher, 1978
- Epigynopteryx maeviaria (Guenée, 1858)
- Ereunetea reussi Gaede, 1914
- Eulycia grisea (Warren, 1897)
- Horisme pallidimacula Prout, 1925
- Idaea angusta (Butler, 1897)
- Idaea exquisita (Warren, 1897)
- Idaea lilliputaria (Warren, 1902)
- Idaea tornivestis (Prout, 1932)
- Idiodes flexilinea (Warren, 1898)
- Isturgia catalaunaria (Guenée, 1858)
- Mauna electa Prout, 1917
- Nothofidonia irregularis Prout, 1915
- Omizodes rubrifasciata (Butler, 1896)
- Pareclipsis anophthalma Prout, 1916
- Petovia marginata Walker, 1854
- Piercia prasinaria (Warren, 1901)
- Pitthea neavei Prout, 1915
- Prasinocyma neavei Prout, 1912
- Prasinocyma vermicularia (Guenée, 1858)
- Rhodophthitus roseovittata (Butler, 1895)
- Rhodophthitus simplex Warren, 1897
- Rhodophthitus tricoloraria (Mabille, 1890)
- Scopula erinaria (Swinhoe, 1904)
- Scopula internata (Guenée, 1857)
- Scopula isomala Prout, 1932
- Scopula lathraea Prout, 1922
- Scopula nigrinotata (Warren, 1897)
- Scopula oenoloma Prout, 1932
- Scopula opicata (Fabricius, 1798)
- Scopula serena Prout, 1920
- Scopula sublobata (Warren, 1898)
- Scopula supina Prout, 1920
- Scotopteryx nictitaria (Herrich-Schäffer, 1855)
- Somatina virginalis Prout, 1917
- Syncollesis coerulea (Warren, 1896)
- Terina circumcincta Prout, 1915
- Terina puncticorpus Warren, 1897
- Thalassodes albifimbria Warren, 1897
- Trimetopia aetheraria Guenée, 1858
- Xanthisthisa tarsispina (Warren, 1901)
- Xanthorhoe exorista Prout, 1922
- Xanthorhoe latigrisea (Warren, 1897)
- Xanthorhoe transjugata Prout, 1923
- Zamarada acosmeta Prout, 1921
- Zamarada adumbrata D. S. Fletcher, 1974
- Zamarada aequilumata D. S. Fletcher, 1974
- Zamarada bathyscaphes Prout, 1912
- Zamarada crystallophana Mabille, 1900
- Zamarada denticatella Prout, 1922
- Zamarada dentigera Warren, 1909
- Zamarada euphrosyne Oberthür, 1912
- Zamarada excavata Bethune-Baker, 1913
- Zamarada flavicaput Warren, 1901
- Zamarada gamma D. S. Fletcher, 1958
- Zamarada glareosa Bastelberger, 1909
- Zamarada ignicosta Prout, 1912
- Zamarada metrioscaphes Prout, 1912
- Zamarada nasuta Warren, 1897
- Zamarada plana Bastelberger, 1909
- Zamarada prolata D. S. Fletcher, 1974
- Zamarada purimargo Prout, 1912
- Zamarada rufilinearia Swinhoe, 1904
- Zamarada scintillans Bastelberger, 1909
- Zamarada seydeli D. S. Fletcher, 1974
- Zamarada vulpina Warren, 1897

== Glyphipterigidae ==
- Chrysocentris clavaria Meyrick 1914

== Gracillariidae ==
- Acrocercops bifasciata (Walsingham, 1891)
- Africephala timaea (Meyrick, 1914)

== Himantopteridae ==
- Semioptila dolicholoba Hampson, 1920
- Semioptila trogoloba Hampson, 1920

== Immidae ==
- Imma steganota Meyrick, 1914

== Lasiocampidae ==
- Bombycopsis metallicus (Distant, 1898)
- Braura ligniclusa (Walker, 1865)
- Catalebeda intermedia Aurivillius, 1925
- Catalebeda jamesoni (Bethune-Baker, 1908)
- Cleopatrina phocea (Druce, 1887)
- Epicnapteroides lobata Strand, 1912
- Epitrabala nyassana (Aurivillius, 1909)
- Eutricha morosa (Walker, 1865)
- Euwallengrenia reducta (Walker, 1855)
- Filiola lanceolata (Hering, 1932)
- Gonometa regia Aurivillius, 1905
- Grellada marshalli (Aurivillius, 1902)
- Lechriolepis pulchra Aurivillius, 1905
- Leipoxais philapseudia Hering, 1928
- Mallocampa audea (Druce, 1887)
- Mallocampa cornutiventris Tams, 1929
- Marmonna marmorata Zolotuhin & Prozorov, 2010
- Marmonna murphyi Zolotuhin & Prozorov, 2010
- Morongea elfiora Zolotuhin & Prozorov, 2010
- Nirbiana obscura (Hering, 1941)
- Odontocheilopteryx dollmani Tams, 1930
- Odontocheilopteryx pattersoni Tams, 1926
- Odontogama superba (Aurivillius, 1914)
- Pachymeta capreolus Aurivillius, 1914
- Pachymetana neavei (Aurivillius, 1915)
- Pachytrina verba Zolotuhin & Gurkovich, 2009
- Pallastica mesoleuca (Strand, 1911)
- Pallastica pyrsocoma (Tams, 1936)
- Philotherma brunnea (Aurivillius, 1908)
- Philotherma fusca Aurivillius, 1908
- Philotherma media Aurivillius, 1909
- Philotherma sordida Aurivillius, 1905
- Pseudolyra cervina (Aurivillius, 1905)
- Stenophatna cymographa (Hampson, 1910)
- Stenophatna hollandi (Tams, 1929)
- Stenophatna rothschildi (Tams, 1936)
- Stoermeriana congoense (Aurivillius, 1908)
- Stoermeriana distinguenda (Aurivillius, 1905)
- Stoermeriana fusca (Aurivillius, 1905)
- Stoermeriana graberi (Dewitz, 1881)
- Stoermeriana sjostedti (Aurivillius, 1902)
- Streblote nyassanum (Strand, 1912)
- Theophasida superba (Aurivillius, 1914)
- Trabala charon Druce, 1910

== Lecithoceridae ==
- Timyra aeolocoma Meyrick, 1939

== Lemoniidae ==
- Sabalia fulleborni Karsch, 1900
- Sabalia fulvicincta Hampson, 1901

== Limacodidae ==
- Afraltha xanthocharis (Clench, 1955)
- Crothaema gloriosa Hering, 1928
- Halseyia rectilinea (Hering, 1937)
- Latoia albifrons Guérin-Méneville, 1844
- Macroplectra flavata West, 1940
- Parapluda incincta (Hampson, 1909)
- Parasa tamara Hering, 1828
- Scotinochroa inconsequens Butler, 1897
- Taeda gemmans (Felder, 1874)
- Taeda prasina Butler, 1896
- Tryphax incurvata West, 1940

== Lymantriidae ==
- Aroa discalis Walker, 1855
- Barlowia charax (Druce, 1896)
- Bracharoa charax (Druce, 1896)
- Bracharoa quadripunctata (Wallengren, 1875)
- Chrysocyma mesopotamia Hampson, 1905
- Cropera stilpnaroma Hering, 1926
- Crorema fulvinotata (Butler, 1893)
- Dasychira ophthalmodes Hering, 1926
- Euproctis bigutta Holland, 1893
- Euproctis crocata (Boisduval, 1847)
- Euproctis crocosticta Hampson, 1905
- Euproctis neavei Tams, 1924
- Euproctis pallida (Kirby, 1896)
- Euproctis terminalis (Walker, 1854)
- Euproctoides acrisia Plötz, 1880
- Heteronygmia dissimilis Aurivillius, 1910
- Homochira rendalli (Distant, 1897)
- Hyaloperina vitrina Hering, 1926
- Lacipa bizonoides Butler, 1893
- Lacipa gracilis Hopffer, 1857
- Laelia curvivirgata Karsch, 1895
- Laelia municipalis Distant, 1897
- Lepidolacipa venosata Hering, 1926
- Leptaroa ochricoloria Strand, 1911
- Leptaroa paupera Hering, 1926
- Ogoa neavei Rothschild, 1916
- Otroeda aino (Bryk, 1915)
- Pirgula atrinotata (Butler, 1897)
- Polymona rufifemur Walker, 1855
- Pteredoa usebia (Swinhoe, 1903)
- Stilpnaroma venosa Hering, 1926
- Stracena bananae (Butler, 1897)

== Metarbelidae ==
- Arbelodes claudiae Lehmann, 2010
- Kroonia murphyi Lehmann, 2010
- Kroonia natalica (Hampson, 1910)
- Metarbela bipuncta Hampson, 1920
- Metarbela dialeuca Hampson, 1910
- Metarbela erecta Gaede, 1929
- Metarbela vaualba Hampson, 1920
- Ortharbela bisinuata (Hampson, 1920)
- Ortharbela minima (Hampson, 1920)
- Salagena albicilia Hampson, 1920
- Salagena violetta Gaede, 1929
- Teragra tristicha Hampson, 1920

== Noctuidae ==
- Aburina coerulescens Hampson, 1926
- Aburina poliophaea Hampson, 1926
- Achaea catella Guenée, 1852
- Achaea ferreotincta Hampson, 1918
- Achaea lienardi (Boisduval, 1833)
- Achaea rothkirchi (Strand, 1914)
- Acontia hampsoni Hacker, Legrain & Fibiger, 2008
- Acontia leucotrigona (Hampson, 1905)
- Acontia nephele Hampson, 1911
- Acontia paratrigona Hacker, Legrain & Fibiger, 2008
- Aegocera fervida (Walker, 1854)
- Aegocera meneta (Cramer, 1775)
- Anoba microphaea Hampson, 1926
- Anomis endochlora Hampson, 1926
- Anomis polymorpha Hampson, 1926
- Antarchaea straminea Hampson, 1926
- Asota speciosa (Drury, 1773)
- Attatha ethiopica Hampson, 1910
- Baniana sminthochroa Hampson, 1926
- Bocula metochrea Hampson, 1926
- Brephos nyassana (Bartel, 1903)
- Calliodes pretiosissima Holland, 1892
- Callyna nigerrima Hampson, 1902
- Cerynea albivitta Hampson, 1918
- Chaetostephana inclusa (Karsch, 1895)
- Chaetostephana rendalli (Rothschild, 1896)
- Chrysodeixis acuta (Walker, [1858])
- Chrysozonata latiflavaria (Swinhoe, 1904)
- Condica conducta (Walker, 1857)
- Conservula cinisigna de Joannis, 1906
- Cortyta setifera Hampson, 1918
- Crameria amabilis (Drury, 1773)
- Crypsotidia maculifera (Staudinger, 1898)
- Cyligramma latona (Cramer, 1775)
- Cyligramma limacina (Guérin-Méneville, 1832)
- Cyligramma magus (Guérin-Méneville, [1844])
- Deinypena nyasana Hampson, 1926
- Digama budonga Bethune-Baker, 1913
- Dysgonia angularis (Boisduval, 1833)
- Dysgonia derogans (Walker, 1858)
- Dysgonia properans (Walker, 1858)
- Dysgonia proxima (Hampson, 1902)
- Dysgonia torrida (Guenée, 1852)
- Dysgonia triplocyma (Hampson, 1913)
- Egybolis vaillantina (Stoll, 1790)
- Entomogramma pardus Guenée, 1852
- Episparis charassota Hampson, 1926
- Episparis homoeosema Hampson, 1926
- Erebus walkeri (Butler, 1875)
- Ethiopica asteropa Hampson, 1909
- Eublemma anachoresis (Wallengren, 1863)
- Eublemma apicata Distant, 1898
- Eublemma baccalix (Swinhoe, 1886)
- Eublemma cochylioides (Guenée, 1852)
- Eublemma exanimis Hampson, 1918
- Eublemma flavescens Hampson, 1918
- Eublemma quadrilineata Moore, 1881
- Eublemma scitula (Rambur, 1833)
- Eublemma tritonia (Hampson, 1902)
- Eucampima atritornalis Hampson, 1926
- Eudocima materna (Linnaeus, 1767)
- Eulocastra carnibasalis Hampson, 1918
- Eulocastra pallida Hampson, 1918
- Eulocastra poliogramma Hampson, 1918
- Eustrotia obliquisignata Hampson, 1918
- Eustrotia rubrisignata Hampson, 1918
- Eutelia polychorda Hampson, 1902
- Euxoa cymograpta Hampson, 1918
- Fodina johnstoni Butler, 1897
- Geniascota patagiata Hampson, 1926
- Gesonia obeditalis Walker, 1859
- Gesonia stictigramma Hampson, 1926
- Grammodes congenita Walker, 1858
- Grammodes exclusiva Pagenstecher, 1907
- Grammodes geometrica (Fabricius, 1775)
- Grammodes stolida (Fabricius, 1775)
- Haemaphlebia phaeomicta Hampson, 1918
- Heliophisma klugii (Boisduval, 1833)
- Heraclia africana (Butler, 1875)
- Heraclia butleri (Walker, 1869)
- Heraclia elongata (Bartel, 1903)
- Heraclia jugans (Jordan, 1913)
- Heraclia perdix (Druce, 1887)
- Heraclia superba (Butler, 1875)
- Herpeperas violaris Hampson, 1926
- Hespagarista caudata (Dewitz, 1879)
- Homaea striatalis Hampson, 1918
- Hypopyra capensis Herrich-Schäffer, 1854
- Hypopyra rufescens (Kirby, 1896)
- Hyposada carneotincta Hampson, 1918
- Hyposada hydrocampata (Guenée, 1858)
- Hyssia pallidicosta Hampson, 1918
- Leoniloma convergens Hampson, 1926
- Leucania homoeoptera (Hampson, 1918)
- Leucania longipennis (Hampson, 1905)
- Leucovis alba (Rothschild, 1897)
- Libystica crenata Hampson, 1926
- Lophocyttarra argyropasta Hampson, 1918
- Lophonotidia nocturna Hampson, 1901
- Lophoptera litigiosa (Boisduval, 1833)
- Marcipa mediana Hampson, 1926
- Marcipa phaeodonta Hampson, 1926
- Marcipa ruptisigna Hampson, 1926
- Masalia flavistrigata (Hampson, 1903)
- Masalia galatheae (Wallengren, 1856)
- Maxera brachypecten Hampson, 1926
- Mazuca strigicincta Walker, 1866
- Mentaxya albifrons (Geyer, 1837)
- Mentaxya ignicollis (Walker, 1857)
- Mesogenea costimacula Hampson, 1926
- Micragrotis nigrisigna Hampson, 1911
- Mitrophrys menete (Cramer, 1775)
- Mocis frugalis (Fabricius, 1775)
- Mocis mayeri (Boisduval, 1833)
- Mocis mutuaria (Walker, 1858)
- Nagia sacerdotis Hampson, 1926
- Nyodes rufifusa (Hampson, 1918)
- Oglasa parallela Hampson, 1926
- Oglasodes nyasica Hampson, 1926
- Omphaloceps daria (Druce, 1895)
- Ophiusa hypoxantha (Hampson, 1918)
- Ophiusa mejanesi (Guenée, 1852)
- Ophiusa tettensis (Hopffer, 1857)
- Ozarba domina (Holland, 1894)
- Ozarba fasciata (Wallengren, 1860)
- Ozarba lepida Saalmüller, 1891
- Ozarba nigroviridis (Hampson, 1902)
- Ozarba toxotis Hampson, 1910
- Pandesma quenavadi Guenée, 1852
- Pangrapta melacleptra Hampson, 1926
- Parachalciope mahura (Felder & Rogenhofer, 1874)
- Paralephana argyresthia Hampson, 1926
- Phaegorista formosa Butler, 1877
- Phaegorista xanthosoma Hampson, 1910
- Phaegorista zebra Butler, 1897
- Plecopterodes moderata (Wallengren, 1860)
- Pleuronodes plexifera Hampson, 1926
- Plusiodonta euchalcia Hampson, 1926
- Plusiophaes thermotis (Hampson, 1926)
- Polydesma umbricola Boisduval, 1833
- Pseudogyrtona nigrivitta Hampson, 1926
- Pseudopais nigrobasalis Bartel, 1903
- Pseudospiris paidiformis Butler, 1895
- Rhanidophora odontophora Hampson, 1926
- Rhesala nyasica Hampson, 1926
- Rhynchina leucodonta Hampson, 1910
- Rivula endotricha Hampson, 1926
- Rivula ethiopina Hampson, 1926
- Rivula lophosoma Hampson, 1926
- Rothia panganica Karsch, 1898
- Saalmuellerana rufimixta (Hampson, 1918)
- Sphingomorpha chlorea (Cramer, 1777)
- Spirama glaucescens (Butler, 1893)
- Taveta eucosmia Hampson, 1926
- Thiacidas fasciata (Fawcett, 1917)
- Thyas meterythra (Hampson, 1918)
- Thyas rubricata (Holland, 1894)
- Tolna cryptoleuca Hampson, 1918
- Tolna hypogrammica Hampson, 1918
- Trachea oxylus (Fawcett, 1917)
- Trigonodes hyppasia (Cramer, 1779)
- Ulothrichopus phaeoleuca Hampson, 1913
- Ulotrichopus primulina (Hampson, 1902)
- Ulotrichopus variegata (Hampson, 1902)

== Nolidae ==
- Chlorozada metaleuca (Hampson, 1905)
- Earias insulana (Boisduval, 1833)
- Eligma duplicata Aurivillius, 1892
- Maurilia arcuata (Walker, [1858])
- Negeta luminosa (Walker, 1858)
- Negeta nivea (Hampson, 1902)
- Nola concinna (Hampson, 1918)
- Nola costiplagiata (Hampson, 1918)
- Ochrothripa mesopis Hampson, 1918
- Odontestis striata Hampson, 1912
- Pardasena punctilinea Hampson, 1918
- Pardasena roeselioides (Walker, 1858)
- Pardoxia graellsii (Feisthamel, 1837)
- Westermannia araeogramma Hampson, 1905

== Notodontidae ==
- Anaphe johnstonei Tams, 1932
- Antheua simplex Walker, 1855
- Antheua trifasciata (Hampson, 1909)
- Deinarchia agramma (Hampson, 1910)
- Desmeocraera congoana Aurivillius, 1900
- Desmeocraera decorata (Wichgraf, 1922)
- Desmeocraera zombae Kiriakoff, 1958
- Elaphrodes duplex (Gaede, 1928)
- Epanaphe clarilla Aurivillius, 1904
- Leucophalera latipennis (Butler, 1897)
- Prosphoroplitis aglaurus Kiriakoff, 1955
- Scalmicauda griseomaculata Gaede, 1928
- Scalmicauda tessmanni (Strand, 1911)
- Synete margarethae Kiriakoff, 1959
- Xanthodonta xanthippa Kiriakoff, 1968

== Oecophoridae ==
- Aeolernis theatrica Meyrick, 1914
- Metachanda citrodesma (Meyrick, 1911)
- Parodaea scaripheuta Meyrick, 1914
- Plasmatica sternitis Meyrick, 1914

== Plutellidae ==
- Plutella xylostella (Linnaeus, 1758)

== Psychidae ==
- Apaphristis themeliota Meyrick, 1915
- Melasina aulodoma Meyrick, 1924
- Melasina chlorotricha Meyrick, 1916
- Melasina sauropa Meyrick, 1908
- Monda junctimacula Hampson, 1910
- Narycia fumicoma Meyrick, 1922
- Narycia terricola (Meyrick, 1915)
- Tretoscopa polycentra Meyrick, 1916
- Typhonia amica (Meyrick, 1908)
- Typhonia dissoluta (Meyrick, 1908)

== Pterophoridae ==
- Agdistis nyasa Kovtunovich & Ustjuzhanin, 2014
- Apoxyptilus uzumarus Kovtunovich & Ustjuzhanin, 2014
- Arcoptilia malawica Kovtunovich & Ustjuzhanin, 2014
- Crassuncus colubratus (Meyrick, 1909)
- Crassuncus ecstaticus (Meyrick, 1932)
- Crassuncus livingstoni Kovtunovich & Ustjuzhanin, 2014
- Crassuncus pacifica (Meyrick, 1911)
- Deuterocopus socotranus Rebel, 1907
- Exelastis crudipennis (Meyrick, 1932)
- Exelastis phlyctaenias (Meyrick, 1911)
- Gypsochares murphy Kovtunovich & Ustjuzhanin, 2014
- Hellinsia сhewa Kovtunovich & Ustjuzhanin, 2014
- Hellinsia madecasseus (Bigot, 1964)
- Hellinsia namizimu Kovtunovich & Ustjuzhanin, 2014
- Marasmarcha bengtssoni (Gielis, 2009)
- Marasmarcha lamborni Kovtunovich & Ustjuzhanin, 2014
- Marasmarcha locharcha (Meyrick, 1924)
- Marasmarcha rubriacuta (Gielis, 2009)
- Oxyptilus orichalcias Meyrick, 1916
- Picardia leza Kovtunovich & Ustjuzhanin, 2014
- Picardia raymondi Kovtunovich & Ustjuzhanin, 2014
- Picardia tumbuka Kovtunovich & Ustjuzhanin, 2014
- Platyptilia farfarellus Zeller, 1867
- Platyptilia mugesse Kovtunovich & Ustjuzhanin, 2014
- Prichotilus tara Ustjuzhanin and Kovtunovich, 2011
- Procapperia insomnis (Townsend, 1956)
- Pterophorus albidus (Zeller, 1852)
- Pterophorus dallastai Gielis, 1991
- Pterophorus spissa (Bigot, 1969)
- Pterophorus rhyparias (Meyrick, 1907)
- Sphenarches anisodactylus (Walker, 1864)
- Sphenarches bifurcatus Gielis, 2009
- Sphenarches mulanje Kovtunovich & Ustjuzhanin, 2014
- Stenodacma cognata Gielis, 2009
- Stenoptilia juniper Kovtunovich & Ustjuzhanin, 2014
- Stenoptilia viettei Gibeaux, 1994

== Pyralidae ==
- Corcyra cephalonica (Stainton, 1866)
- Lamoria imbella (Walker, 1864)
- Pyralosis polycyclophora (Hampson, 1916)

== Saturniidae ==
- Adafroptilum incana (Sonthonnax, 1899)
- Antistathmoptera rectangulata Pinhey, 1968
- Athletes gigas (Sonthonnax, 1902)
- Athletes semialba (Sonthonnax, 1904)
- Aurivillius seydeli Rougeot, 1962
- Bunaeopsis aurantiaca (Rothschild, 1895)
- Bunaeopsis hersilia (Westwood, 1849)
- Bunaeopsis jacksoni (Jordan, 1908)
- Campimoptilum kuntzei (Dewitz, 1881)
- Cinabra hyperbius (Westwood, 1881)
- Cirina forda (Westwood, 1849)
- Decachorda pomona (Weymer, 1892)
- Decachorda rosea Aurivillius, 1898
- Epiphora antinorii (Oberthür, 1880)
- Gonimbrasia rectilineata (Sonthonnax, 1899)
- Gonimbrasia wahlbergii (Boisduval, 1847)
- Gynanisa maja (Klug, 1836)
- Holocerina agomensis (Karsch, 1896)
- Holocerina angulata (Aurivillius, 1893)
- Holocerina rhodesiensis (Janse, 1918)
- Holocerina smilax (Westwood, 1849)
- Imbrasia ertli Rebel, 1904
- Lobobunaea angasana (Westwood, 1849)
- Ludia delegorguei (Boisduval, 1847)
- Ludia dentata (Hampson, 1891)
- Ludia orinoptena Karsch, 1892
- Melanocera sufferti (Weymer, 1896)
- Micragone ansorgei (Rothschild, 1907)
- Micragone cana (Aurivillius, 1893)
- Micragone gaetani Bouyer, 2008
- Micragone nyasae Rougeot, 1962
- Nudaurelia dione (Fabricius, 1793)
- Nudaurelia gueinzii (Staudinger, 1872)
- Nudaurelia lucida (Rothschild, 1907)
- Nudaurelia macrops Rebel, 1917
- Nudaurelia macrothyris (Rothschild, 1906)
- Nudaurelia nyassana (Rothschild, 1907)
- Nudaurelia rhodina (Rothschild, 1907)
- Orthogonioptilum adiegetum Karsch, 1892
- Pseudaphelia apollinaris (Boisduval, 1847)
- Pseudimbrasia deyrollei (J. Thomson, 1858)
- Pseudobunaea cyrene Weymer, 1908
- Pseudobunaea irius (Fabricius, 1793)
- Pseudobunaea tyrrhena (Westwood, 1849)
- Tagoropsiella mulanjensis Darge, 2008
- Tagoropsis hanningtoni (Butler, 1883)
- Ubaena dolabella (Druce, 1886)
- Urota conjuncta Bouvier, 1930
- Urota sinope (Westwood, 1849)
- Usta terpsichore (Maassen & Weymer, 1885)

== Sesiidae ==
- Chamaesphecia ethiopica Hampson, 1919
- Chamanthedon leucocera Hampson, 1919
- Homogyna albicincta Hampson, 1919
- Hypanthedon marisa (Druce, 1899)
- Macrotarsipus albipunctus Hampson, 1893
- Macrotarsipus microthyris Hampson, 1919
- Melittia aureosquamata (Wallengren, 1863)
- Melittia natalensis Butler, 1874
- Melittia oedipus Oberthür, 1878
- Melittia pyropis Hampson, 1919
- Monopetalotaxis chalciphora Hampson, 1919
- Paranthrene thalassina Hampson, 1919
- Podosesia surodes Hampson, 1919
- Pseudomelittia berlandi Le Cerf, 1917
- Pyranthrene flammans Hampson, 1919
- Sura pyrocera Hampson, 1919
- Sura ruficauda (Rothschild, 1911)
- Synanthedon flavipalpis (Hampson, 1910)
- Thyranthrene squamata Gaede, 1929
- Tipulamima sexualis (Hampson, 1910)
- Tipulamima sophax (Druce, 1899)

== Sphingidae ==
- Acanthosphinx guessfeldti (Dewitz, 1879)
- Afroclanis calcareus (Rothschild & Jordan, 1907)
- Antinephele maculifera Holland, 1889
- Basiothia medea (Fabricius, 1781)
- Cephonodes hylas (Linnaeus, 1771)
- Chaerocina dohertyi Rothschild & Jordan, 1903
- Dovania poecila Rothschild & Jordan, 1903
- Falcatula falcata (Rothschild & Jordan, 1903)
- Hippotion gracilis (Butler, 1875)
- Hippotion roseipennis (Butler, 1882)
- Leucophlebia afra Karsch, 1891
- Likoma apicalis Rothschild & Jordan, 1903
- Macroglossum trochilus (Hübner, 1823)
- Neopolyptychus compar (Rothschild & Jordan, 1903)
- Nephele bipartita Butler, 1878
- Nephele funebris (Fabricius, 1793)
- Nephele lannini Jordan, 1926
- Nephele rosae Butler, 1875
- Phylloxiphia metria (Jordan, 1920)
- Platysphinx piabilis (Distant, 1897)
- Polyptychopsis marshalli (Rothschild & Jordan, 1903)
- Polyptychus coryndoni Rothschild & Jordan, 1903
- Temnora elegans (Rothschild, 1895)
- Temnora griseata Rothschild & Jordan, 1903
- Temnora iapygoides (Holland, 1889)
- Temnora marginata (Walker, 1856)
- Temnora zantus (Herrich-Schäffer, 1854)
- Theretra capensis (Linnaeus, 1764)

== Thyrididae ==
- Arniocera chalcopasta Hampson, 1910
- Arniocera erythropyga (Wallengren, 1860)
- Arniocera zambesina (Walker, 1866)
- Chrysotypus tessellata (Warren, 1908)
- Dilophura caudata (Jordan, 1907)
- Dysodia constellata Warren, 1908
- Dysodia vitrina (Boisduval, 1829)
- Gnathodes helvella Whalley, 1971
- Netrocera diffinis Jordan, 1907
- Netrocera hemichrysa (Hampson, 1910)

== Tineidae ==
- Acridotarsa melipecta (Meyrick, 1915)
- Amphixystis colubrina (Meyrick, 1914)
- Amphixystis epirota (Meyrick, 1914)
- Amphixystis serrata (Meyrick, 1914)
- Cimitra spinignatha (Gozmány, 1968)
- Criticonoma phalacropis (Meyrick, 1915)
- Edosa montanata (Gozmány, 1968)
- Edosa phlegethon (Gozmány, 1968)
- Emblematodes cyanochra Meyrick, 1914
- Hapsifera marmarota Meyrick, 1914
- Hapsifera septica Meyrick, 1908
- Hyperbola moschias (Meyrick, 1914)
- Hyperbola zicsii Gozmány, 1965
- Leptonoma citrozona Meyrick, 1916
- Machaeropteris histurga Meyrick, 1915
- Machaeropteris irritabilis Meyrick, 1932
- Opogona phaeocrana Meyrick, 1914
- Opogona plumbifera (Meyrick, 1914)
- Opogona zophocrana Meyrick, 1915
- Pachypsaltis pachystoma (Meyrick, 1920)
- Perissomastix acutibasis Gozmány, 1968
- Perissomastix dentifera Gozmány & Vári, 1973
- Perissomastix fulvicoma (Meyrick, 1921)
- Perissomastix montis Gozmány, 1968
- Phthoropoea oenochares (Meyrick, 1920)
- Pitharcha chalinaea Meyrick, 1908
- Scalmatica rigens (Meyrick, 1916)
- Sphallestasis biclavata (Gozmány, 1968)
- Sphallestasis exarata (Gozmány, 1968)
- Tinea sporoptera Gozmány, 1968
- Tinea subalbidella Stainton, 1867
- Trichophaga tapetzella (Linnaeus, 1767)
- Wegneria acervalis (Meyrick, 1914)

== Tortricidae ==
- Acroclita trichocnemis Meyrick, 1914
- Afroploce karsholti Aarvik, 2004
- Bactra endea Diakonoff, 1963
- Bactra rhabdonoma Diakonoff, 1963
- Bactra stagnicolana Zeller, 1852
- Capua ptilocrossa Meyrick, 1914
- Capua pusillana (Walker, 1863)
- Cnephasia melliflua Meyrick, 1914
- Cosmorrhyncha acrocosma (Meyrick, 1908)
- Cryptophlebia peltastica (Meyrick, 1921)
- Cydia heptacopa (Meyrick, 1916)
- Cydia reflectrix (Meyrick, 1928)
- Eccopsis incultana (Walker, 1863)
- Eccopsis wahlbergiana Zeller, 1852
- Epichorista phaeocoma Meyrick, 1914
- Eucosma sandycitis Meyrick, 1916
- Metendothenia balanacma (Meyrick, 1914)
- Multiquaestia kingstoni Aarvik & Karisch, 2009
- Multiquaestia skulei Aarvik & Karisch, 2009
- Olethreutes calchantis (Meyrick, 1914)
- Olethreutes iorrhoa (Meyrick, 1914)
- Tortrix dinota Meyrick, 1918
- Tortrix entherma Meyrick, 1914
- Tortrix platystega Meyrick, 1920

== Uraniidae ==
- Gathynia auratiplaga Warren, 1901

== Zygaenidae ==
- Astyloneura meridionalis (Hampson, 1920)
- Metanycles flavibasis Hampson, 1920
- Saliunca assimilis Jordan, 1907
- Saliunca metacyanea Hampson, 1920
- Syringura triplex (Plötz, 1880)
- Tasema fulvithorax Hampson, 1920
