= Thyranthrene adumbrata =

Scientific classification
- Domain: Eukaryota
- Kingdom: Animalia
- Phylum: Arthropoda
- Class: Insecta
- Order: Lepidoptera
- Family: Sesiidae
- Genus: Thyranthrene
- Species: T. adumbrata

Binomial name
- Thyranthrene adumbrata Bartsch, 2008

Species of moth

Thyranthrene adumbrata is a moth of the family Sesiidae. It is known from South Africa.
