= Sebrus absconditus =

Scientific classification
- Kingdom: Animalia
- Phylum: Arthropoda
- Clade: Pancrustacea
- Class: Insecta
- Order: Lepidoptera
- Family: Crambidae
- Subfamily: Crambinae
- Tribe: Crambini
- Genus: Sebrus
- Species: S. absconditus

Binomial name
- Sebrus absconditus Bassi, 1995

Species of moth

Sebrus absconditus is a moth in the family Crambidae. It was described by Graziano Bassi in 1995. It is found in South Africa and Zimbabwe.
