= Timyra marmaritis =

Scientific classification
- Domain: Eukaryota
- Kingdom: Animalia
- Phylum: Arthropoda
- Class: Insecta
- Order: Lepidoptera
- Family: Lecithoceridae
- Genus: Timyra
- Species: T. marmaritis

Binomial name
- Timyra marmaritis Meyrick, 1906

Species of moth

Timyra marmaritis is a moth in the family Lecithoceridae. It was first described by Edward Meyrick in 1906. It is found in Sri Lanka.

The wingspan is 21–23 mm. The forewings are whitish ochreous tinged with yellowish and sprinkled with dark fuscous. There is a narrow dark fuscous basal fascia, followed by a clear pale ochreous-yellow subbasal fascia, edged posteriorly with dark fuscous suffusion. There is a slender cloudy dark fuscous slightly oblique median fascia, slightly bent in the middle and a dark fuscous streak along the termen. The hindwings are posteriorly clothed with hair-scales, rather dark fuscous, the disc more or less broadly suffused with light ochreous yellowish. There is a subdorsal groove enclosing an ochreous-yellowish hair-pencil from the base and a dark fuscous terminal line.
