= Donacoscaptes interlineatus =

Scientific classification
- Kingdom: Animalia
- Phylum: Arthropoda
- Clade: Pancrustacea
- Class: Insecta
- Order: Lepidoptera
- Family: Crambidae
- Subfamily: Crambinae
- Tribe: Haimbachiini
- Genus: Donacoscaptes
- Species: D. interlineatus

Binomial name
- Donacoscaptes interlineatus (Zeller, 1881)

Synonyms
- Chilo interlineatus Zeller, 1881

Species of moth

Donacoscaptes interlineatus is a moth in the family Crambidae. It was described by Zeller in 1881. It is found in Colombia.
