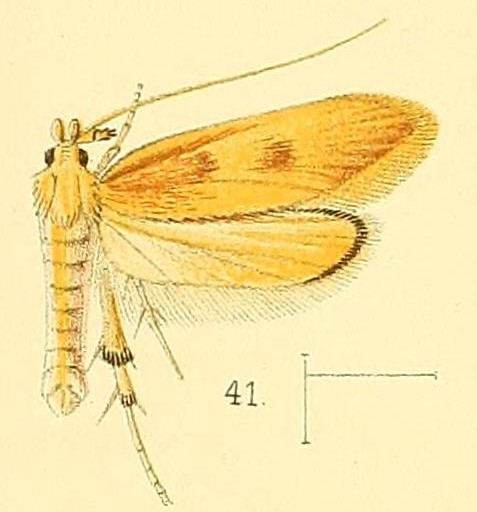
- T. extranea ♂.

Scientific classification
- Domain: Eukaryota
- Kingdom: Animalia
- Phylum: Arthropoda
- Class: Insecta
- Order: Lepidoptera
- Family: Lecithoceridae
- Genus: Timyra
- Species: T. extranea

Binomial name
- Timyra extranea Walsingham, 1891

= Timyra extranea =

Species of moth

Timyra extranea is a moth in the family Lecithoceridae. It was described by Lord Walsingham in 1891. It is found in Gambia.

The wingspan is 14–15 millimetres (0.55–0.59 in). The forewings are ochreous, faintly and delicately shaded with brownish ochreous on the basal and outer thirds of the wing-length. Two faintly indicated brownish ochreous discal spots, one at the end of the basal third, the other at the commencement of the outer third, precede and follow the paler central space. The hindwings are pale ochreous, narrowly bordered in males around the apex and apical margin with brownish ochreous.
