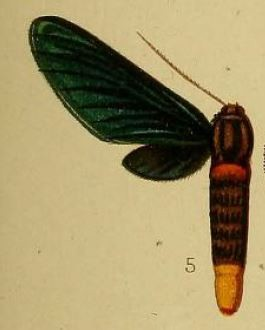

Scientific classification
- Kingdom: Animalia
- Phylum: Arthropoda
- Class: Insecta
- Order: Lepidoptera
- Superfamily: Noctuoidea
- Family: Erebidae
- Subfamily: Arctiinae
- Genus: Pseudmelisa
- Species: P. chalybsa

Binomial name
- Pseudmelisa chalybsa Hampson, 1910

Synonyms
- Pseudmelisa chalybea Zerny, 1912

= Pseudmelisa chalybsa =

Species of moth

Pseudmelisa chalybsa is a moth in the family Erebidae. It was described by George Hampson in 1910. It is found in the Democratic Republic of the Congo.
