= Timyra cingalensis =

Scientific classification
- Domain: Eukaryota
- Kingdom: Animalia
- Phylum: Arthropoda
- Class: Insecta
- Order: Lepidoptera
- Family: Lecithoceridae
- Genus: Timyra
- Species: T. cingalensis

Binomial name
- Timyra cingalensis Walsingham, [1886]

Species of moth

Timyra cingalensis is a moth in the family Lecithoceridae. It was described by Thomas de Grey in 1886. It is found in Sri Lanka.

The wingspan is about 27 mm. The forewings are pale straw-white, with a small tuft of raised purplish scales below the costal margin near the base, above and connected with which an attenuated purplish shade extends from the base nearly to the middle of the wing. Immediately beyond the middle is a purplish straight band, or fascia, divided into two parts by a slender yellow line from the costal to the dorsal margin, from this the fascia a yellow line extends around the costal and apical margin to the anal angle, followed by a deep brown line of equal width, at the base of the purplish-grey fringes. Within the apical margin, a space above the anal angle is much sprinkled with purplish-grey scales. The hindwings are ochreous, shaded with purplish-grey along the outer margin and near the abdominal angle. The fringes are pale ochreous.
