= Timyra praeceptrix =

Scientific classification
- Domain: Eukaryota
- Kingdom: Animalia
- Phylum: Arthropoda
- Class: Insecta
- Order: Lepidoptera
- Family: Lecithoceridae
- Genus: Timyra
- Species: T. praeceptrix

Binomial name
- Timyra praeceptrix Meyrick, 1910

Species of moth

Timyra praeceptrix is a moth in the family Lecithoceridae. It was described by Edward Meyrick in 1910. It is found in Sri Lanka.

The wingspan is 21–25 mm. The forewings are dark purplish fuscous. The basal, median, and terminal areas are marked with suffused longitudinal orange streaks which are very variable in development, but discontinuous between the areas, most largely developed in males. In males, there is a cloudy transverse ochreous-whitish or pale orange transverse line before the middle. There are two short white streaks on veins 8 and 9 towards the costa and a whitish line along the termen. The hindwings are rather dark fuscous, in males more or less suffusedly mixed with ochreous yellowish along a broad longitudinal median area. There is also a subdorsal groove enclosing an expansible pencil of very long whitish-ochreous hairs in males.
