= Monopetalotaxis pyrocraspis =

Scientific classification
- Kingdom: Animalia
- Phylum: Arthropoda
- Class: Insecta
- Order: Lepidoptera
- Family: Sesiidae
- Genus: Monopetalotaxis
- Species: M. pyrocraspis

Binomial name
- Monopetalotaxis pyrocraspis (Hampson, 1910)

Synonyms
- Sciapteron pyrocraspis Hampson, 1910

Species of moth

Monopetalotaxis pyrocraspis is a moth of the family Sesiidae. It is known from South Africa.
