= Timyra lecticaria =

Scientific classification
- Domain: Eukaryota
- Kingdom: Animalia
- Phylum: Arthropoda
- Class: Insecta
- Order: Lepidoptera
- Family: Lecithoceridae
- Genus: Timyra
- Species: T. lecticaria

Binomial name
- Timyra lecticaria Meyrick, 1916

Species of moth

Timyra lecticaria is a moth in the family Lecithoceridae. It was described by Edward Meyrick in 1916. It is found in Sri Lanka.

The wingspan is about 18 mm. The forewings are dark fuscous and an elongate pale yellow-ochreous blotch extending along the costa from before the middle almost to the apex, and reaching nearly halfway across the wing, its anterior angle sending a short slender whitish-ochreous projection downwards. The hindwings are whitish yellowish, on the terminal two-fifths except along the costa closely strewn with rather dark fuscous hairscales.
