= Carcinopodia argentata =

Scientific classification
- Domain: Eukaryota
- Kingdom: Animalia
- Phylum: Arthropoda
- Class: Insecta
- Order: Lepidoptera
- Superfamily: Noctuoidea
- Family: Erebidae
- Subfamily: Arctiinae
- Genus: Carcinopodia
- Species: C. argentata

Binomial name
- Carcinopodia argentata (Distant, 1897)

Synonyms
- Gnophria argentata Distant, 1897

Species of moth

Carcinopodia argentata is a moth of the subfamily Arctiinae. It is found in South Africa.
