= Timyra temenodes =

Scientific classification
- Domain: Eukaryota
- Kingdom: Animalia
- Phylum: Arthropoda
- Class: Insecta
- Order: Lepidoptera
- Family: Lecithoceridae
- Genus: Timyra
- Species: T. temenodes

Binomial name
- Timyra temenodes Meyrick, 1922

Species of moth

Timyra temenodes is a moth in the family Lecithoceridae. It was described by Edward Meyrick in 1922. It is found in Sri Lanka.

The wingspan is 23–25 mm. The forewings are grey, irregularly speckled with whitish, the costal edge pale yellowish. There is a narrow transverse ochreous-whitish fascia towards the base not reaching the costa. The hindwings are light ochreous yellow with an irregular dark grey marginal band running all around the wing except in the middle of the base.
