= Donacoscaptes evanidella =

Scientific classification
- Domain: Eukaryota
- Kingdom: Animalia
- Phylum: Arthropoda
- Class: Insecta
- Order: Lepidoptera
- Family: Crambidae
- Genus: Donacoscaptes
- Species: D. evanidella

Binomial name
- Donacoscaptes evanidella (Schaus, 1913)

Synonyms
- Erupa evanidella Schaus, 1913; Erupa incoloralis Dyar, 1914

Species of moth

Donacoscaptes evanidella is a moth in the family Crambidae. It was described by Schaus in 1913. It is found in Costa Rica and Panama.
