= Donacoscaptes attenuata =

Scientific classification
- Kingdom: Animalia
- Phylum: Arthropoda
- Class: Insecta
- Order: Lepidoptera
- Family: Crambidae
- Subfamily: Crambinae
- Tribe: Haimbachiini
- Genus: Donacoscaptes
- Species: D. attenuata

Binomial name
- Donacoscaptes attenuata (Hampson, 1919)

Synonyms
- Schoenobius attenuata Hampson, 1919

Species of moth

Donacoscaptes attenuata is a moth in the family Crambidae. It was described by George Hampson in 1919. It is found in South Africa, where it has been recorded from KwaZulu-Natal.
