= Thyranthrene metazonata =

Scientific classification
- Kingdom: Animalia
- Phylum: Arthropoda
- Class: Insecta
- Order: Lepidoptera
- Family: Sesiidae
- Genus: Thyranthrene
- Species: T. metazonata

Binomial name
- Thyranthrene metazonata Hampson, 1919

Species of moth

Thyranthrene metazonata is a moth of the family Sesiidae. It is known from South Africa.
