= Donacoscaptes berthellus =

Scientific classification
- Domain: Eukaryota
- Kingdom: Animalia
- Phylum: Arthropoda
- Class: Insecta
- Order: Lepidoptera
- Family: Crambidae
- Subfamily: Crambinae
- Tribe: Haimbachiini
- Genus: Donacoscaptes
- Species: D. berthellus

Binomial name
- Donacoscaptes berthellus (Schaus in Dyar, 1911)

Synonyms
- Diatraea berthellus Schaus in Dyar, 1911

Species of moth

Donacoscaptes berthellus is a moth in the family Crambidae. It was described by Schaus in 1911. It is found in Brazil (Parana).
