= Timyra selmatias =

Scientific classification
- Domain: Eukaryota
- Kingdom: Animalia
- Phylum: Arthropoda
- Class: Insecta
- Order: Lepidoptera
- Family: Lecithoceridae
- Genus: Timyra
- Species: T. selmatias

Binomial name
- Timyra selmatias Meyrick, 1908

Species of moth

Timyra selmatias is a moth in the family Lecithoceridae. It was described by Edward Meyrick in 1908. It is found in Sri Lanka.

The wingspan is 18–19 mm. The forewings are purplish fuscous, sprinkled with blackish. The median third is obscurely streaked with whitish on the veins and there is a narrow irregular orange transverse fascia from three-fifths of the costa to three-fourths of the dorsum. A triangular spot of whitish suffusion is found on the costa at about four-fifths, and an irregular suffused whitish streak immediately before the termen. The apical and terminal edge are suffused with dark fuscous. The hindwings are grey.
