= Pseudmelisa demiavis =

Scientific classification
- Domain: Eukaryota
- Kingdom: Animalia
- Phylum: Arthropoda
- Class: Insecta
- Order: Lepidoptera
- Superfamily: Noctuoidea
- Family: Erebidae
- Subfamily: Arctiinae
- Genus: Pseudmelisa
- Species: P. demiavis

Binomial name
- Pseudmelisa demiavis Kaye, 1919

Species of moth

Pseudmelisa demiavis is a moth in the family Erebidae. It was described by William James Kaye in 1919. It is found in Cameroon.
