= Monopetalotaxis luteopunctata =

Scientific classification
- Domain: Eukaryota
- Kingdom: Animalia
- Phylum: Arthropoda
- Class: Insecta
- Order: Lepidoptera
- Family: Sesiidae
- Genus: Monopetalotaxis
- Species: M. luteopunctata

Binomial name
- Monopetalotaxis luteopunctata de Freina, 2011

Species of moth

Monopetalotaxis luteopunctata is a moth of the family Sesiidae. It is known from South Africa.
