= Sebrus amandus =

Scientific classification
- Kingdom: Animalia
- Phylum: Arthropoda
- Clade: Pancrustacea
- Class: Insecta
- Order: Lepidoptera
- Family: Crambidae
- Subfamily: Crambinae
- Tribe: Crambini
- Genus: Sebrus
- Species: S. amandus

Binomial name
- Sebrus amandus Błeszyński, 1970

Species of moth

Sebrus amandus is a moth in the family Crambidae. It was described by Stanisław Błeszyński in 1970. It is found in Perinet, Madagascar.

This species has a forewing length of 7–8 mm, with a dull whitish ground colour, dusted with brown scales. The types were provided from Perinet, Madagascar. It can be distinguished from Pediasia by the double frenulum in the female (single in Pediasia species).

== Related pages ==
- List of moths of Madagascar
