= Timyra tinctella =

Scientific classification
- Domain: Eukaryota
- Kingdom: Animalia
- Phylum: Arthropoda
- Class: Insecta
- Order: Lepidoptera
- Family: Lecithoceridae
- Genus: Timyra
- Species: T. tinctella

Binomial name
- Timyra tinctella Walsingham, [1886]

Synonyms
- Tipha tinctella Walsingham, [1886]

Species of moth

Timyra tinctella is a moth in the family Lecithoceridae. It was described by Thomas de Grey in 1886. It is found in Sri Lanka.

The wingspan is about 21 mm. The forewings are bright ochreous, the costal margin broadly smeared with purplish-brown to within one-third of the apex. There is a small patch of raised scales of the same colour on the dorsal margin near the base. The dorsal margin is shaded beyond the middle with purplish-brown, but this does not reach beyond the anal angle. The fringes are bright ochreous at the base, outwardly purplish-grey, the two colours being separated by a slender dark brown line. The hindwings are brownish-grey, with pale ochreous fringes, tipped with shining grey.
