= Donacoscaptes alfoldellus =

Scientific classification
- Domain: Eukaryota
- Kingdom: Animalia
- Phylum: Arthropoda
- Class: Insecta
- Order: Lepidoptera
- Family: Crambidae
- Subfamily: Crambinae
- Tribe: Haimbachiini
- Genus: Donacoscaptes
- Species: D. alfoldellus

Binomial name
- Donacoscaptes alfoldellus (Schaus, 1922)

Synonyms
- Chilo alfoldellus Schaus, 1922

Species of moth

Donacoscaptes alfoldellus is a moth in the family Crambidae. It was described by Schaus in 1922. It is found in Brazil (Rio de Janeiro).
