= Sebrus pseudosparsellus =

Scientific classification
- Kingdom: Animalia
- Phylum: Arthropoda
- Clade: Pancrustacea
- Class: Insecta
- Order: Lepidoptera
- Family: Crambidae
- Subfamily: Crambinae
- Tribe: Crambini
- Genus: Sebrus
- Species: S. pseudosparsellus

Binomial name
- Sebrus pseudosparsellus (Błeszyński, 1961)

Synonyms
- Crambus pseudosparsellus Błeszyński, 1961; Crambus pseudoparsellus Błeszyński & Collins, 1962

Species of moth

Sebrus pseudosparsellus is a moth in the family Crambidae. It was described by Stanisław Błeszyński in 1961. It is found in the Democratic Republic of the Congo and Zimbabwe.
