= Timyra floccula =

Scientific classification
- Domain: Eukaryota
- Kingdom: Animalia
- Phylum: Arthropoda
- Class: Insecta
- Order: Lepidoptera
- Family: Lecithoceridae
- Genus: Timyra
- Species: T. floccula

Binomial name
- Timyra floccula Bradley, 1965

Species of moth

Timyra floccula is a moth in the family Lecithoceridae. It was described by John David Bradley in 1965 and is found in Uganda.
