= Timyra pristica =

Scientific classification
- Domain: Eukaryota
- Kingdom: Animalia
- Phylum: Arthropoda
- Class: Insecta
- Order: Lepidoptera
- Family: Lecithoceridae
- Genus: Timyra
- Species: T. pristica

Binomial name
- Timyra pristica Meyrick, 1916

Species of moth

Timyra pristica is a moth in the family Lecithoceridae. It was described by Edward Meyrick in 1916. It is found in Sri Lanka.

The wingspan is 16–18 mm. The forewings are rather light fuscous, with scattered dark fuscous scales. The markings are very undefined, formed of dark fuscous and blackish sprinkles. There is a basal patch occupying about one-fourth of the wing, the edge convex on the upper half and sinuate beneath. There are transverse lines before the middle and at two-thirds, the first rather incurved, pale edged anteriorly, the second curved inwards on the median third, pale edged posteriorly. There is a terminal fascia, widest opposite the apex and narrowed to a point at the tornus. The hindwings are whitish ochreous, the apex suffused with pale grey.
