= Timyra parochra =

Scientific classification
- Domain: Eukaryota
- Kingdom: Animalia
- Phylum: Arthropoda
- Class: Insecta
- Order: Lepidoptera
- Family: Lecithoceridae
- Genus: Timyra
- Species: T. parochra

Binomial name
- Timyra parochra Meyrick, 1906

Species of moth

Timyra parochra is a moth in the family Lecithoceridae. It was described by Edward Meyrick in 1906. It is found in Sri Lanka.

The wingspan is 23–27 mm. The forewings are deep yellow ochreous or brownish ochreous, sprinkled with purplish fuscous and dark fuscous. There is a curved postmedian fascia more or less obscurely indicated by margins of purplish-fuscous and dark fuscous suffusion, narrowed dorsally, the enclosed portion sometimes ferruginous tinged. The hindwings are pale whitish ochreous, towards the termen slightly infuscated. There is a slight groove on the lower margin of the cell.
