= Timyra phycisella =

Scientific classification
- Kingdom: Animalia
- Phylum: Arthropoda
- Class: Insecta
- Order: Lepidoptera
- Family: Lecithoceridae
- Genus: Timyra
- Species: T. phycisella

Binomial name
- Timyra phycisella Walker, 1864

Synonyms
- Uipsa perionella Walker, 1864

Species of moth

Timyra phycisella is a moth in the family Lecithoceridae. It was described by Francis Walker in 1864. It is found in Sri Lanka.

The wingspan is about 25 mm. Adults are cinereous yellowish, the forewings with three cupreous bands. The first band basal, the second and third very broad, the second contracted towards the costa, irregularly connected with the third, which is submarginal. The marginal line is dark cupreous and the fringe is cupreous, cinereous at the base.
