= Timyra crassella =

Scientific classification
- Domain: Eukaryota
- Kingdom: Animalia
- Phylum: Arthropoda
- Class: Insecta
- Order: Lepidoptera
- Family: Lecithoceridae
- Genus: Timyra
- Species: T. crassella

Binomial name
- Timyra crassella (C. Felder, R. Felder & Rogenhofer, 1875)

Synonyms
- Harpella crassella Felder & Rogenhofer, 1875; Timyra sphenias Meyrick, 1905

Species of moth

Timyra crassella is a moth in the family Lecithoceridae. It was described by Cajetan Felder, Rudolf Felder and Alois Friedrich Rogenhofer in 1875. It is found in Sri Lanka.

The wingspan is 25–28 mm. The forewings are purplish fuscous, irregularly irrorated (sprinkled) with dark fuscous, sometimes posteriorly sprinkled with whitish ochreous. There is a transverse elongate-triangular ochreous-yellow blotch beyond the middle, the apex downwards, more or less nearly touching both margins. The hindwings are pale ochreous yellowish, the termen in females narrowly suffused irregularly with fuscous, in males only at the apex and towards the tornus.
