= Donacoscaptes marcella =

Scientific classification
- Domain: Eukaryota
- Kingdom: Animalia
- Phylum: Arthropoda
- Class: Insecta
- Order: Lepidoptera
- Family: Crambidae
- Subfamily: Crambinae
- Tribe: Haimbachiini
- Genus: Donacoscaptes
- Species: D. marcella

Binomial name
- Donacoscaptes marcella (Schaus, 1913)

Synonyms
- Chilo marcella Schaus, 1913

Species of moth

Donacoscaptes marcella is a moth in the family Crambidae. It was described by Schaus in 1913. It is found in Costa Rica.
