= Timyra schoenota =

Scientific classification
- Domain: Eukaryota
- Kingdom: Animalia
- Phylum: Arthropoda
- Class: Insecta
- Order: Lepidoptera
- Family: Lecithoceridae
- Genus: Timyra
- Species: T. schoenota

Binomial name
- Timyra schoenota Meyrick, 1908

Species of moth

Timyra schoenota is a moth in the family Lecithoceridae. It was described by Edward Meyrick in 1908. It is found in southern India.

The wingspan is 24–27 mm. The forewings are ochreous orange in males and pale ochreous yellowish streaked with orange in females. There is a costal streak from the base to three-fifths and a series of well-marked interneural streaks, not reaching the costa posteriorly or the termen, blackish or dark fuscous, interrupted by a somewhat curved oblique double median fascia, of which the first half is ochreous yellow, paler in females, and the second deep ochreous orange suffusedly edged with dark fuscous. There is a blackish line along the posterior part of the costa and termen. The hindwings are dark fuscous, in males with an ochreous-yellow streak from the base along a subdorsal groove enclosing a pencil of long ochreous-whitish hairs, posteriorly dilated into a broad patch extending all along the termen but not quite reaching it, in which is a curved line of appressed hairs.
