= Donacoscaptes albimarginalis =

Scientific classification
- Kingdom: Animalia
- Phylum: Arthropoda
- Class: Insecta
- Order: Lepidoptera
- Family: Crambidae
- Subfamily: Crambinae
- Tribe: Haimbachiini
- Genus: Donacoscaptes
- Species: D. albimarginalis

Binomial name
- Donacoscaptes albimarginalis (Hampson, 1919)

Synonyms
- Chilo albimarginalis Hampson, 1919

Species of moth

Donacoscaptes albimarginalis is a moth in the family Crambidae. It was described by George Hampson in 1919. It is found in Peru.
