= Donacoscaptes semivittalis =

Scientific classification
- Domain: Eukaryota
- Kingdom: Animalia
- Phylum: Arthropoda
- Class: Insecta
- Order: Lepidoptera
- Family: Crambidae
- Subfamily: Crambinae
- Tribe: Haimbachiini
- Genus: Donacoscaptes
- Species: D. semivittalis

Binomial name
- Donacoscaptes semivittalis (Dognin, 1907)

Synonyms
- Chilo semivittalis Dognin, 1907

Species of moth

Donacoscaptes semivittalis is a moth in the family Crambidae. It was described by Paul Dognin in 1907. It is found in Peru.
