= Timyra aulonitis =

Scientific classification
- Domain: Eukaryota
- Kingdom: Animalia
- Phylum: Arthropoda
- Class: Insecta
- Order: Lepidoptera
- Family: Lecithoceridae
- Genus: Timyra
- Species: T. aulonitis

Binomial name
- Timyra aulonitis Meyrick, 1908

Species of moth

Timyra aulonitis is a moth in the family Lecithoceridae. It is found in Sri Lanka.

The wingspan is 17–19 mm. The forewings are dark fuscous, all veins marked by ochreous-whitish lines, sometimes partially tinged with ochreous-yellow. The costal edge is pale ochreous-yellowish. The hindwings are grey, in males with a broad whitish-ochreous patch extending through the disc from near the base to near the termen, beneath which is a groove containing a pencil of whitish-ochreous hairs.
