= Carcinopodia schoutedeni =

Scientific classification
- Kingdom: Animalia
- Phylum: Arthropoda
- Class: Insecta
- Order: Lepidoptera
- Superfamily: Noctuoidea
- Family: Erebidae
- Subfamily: Arctiinae
- Genus: Carcinopodia
- Species: C. schoutedeni

Binomial name
- Carcinopodia schoutedeni Strand, 1918

Species of moth

Carcinopodia schoutedeni is a moth of the subfamily Arctiinae. It is found in the Democratic Republic of Congo.
