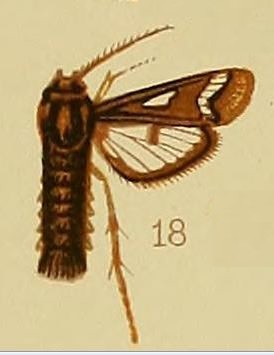
- Thyranthrene obliquizona

Scientific classification
- Kingdom: Animalia
- Phylum: Arthropoda
- Class: Insecta
- Order: Lepidoptera
- Family: Sesiidae
- Tribe: Paranthrenini
- Genus: Thyranthrene; Hampson, 1919

Species
- See text

= Thyranthrene =

Genus of moths

Thyranthrene is a genus of moths in the family Sesiidae.

== Species ==
- Thyranthrene adumbrata Bartsch, 2008
- Thyranthrene albicincta (Hampson, 1919)
- Thyranthrene metazonata Hampson, 1919
- Thyranthrene obliquizona (Hampson, 1910)
- Thyranthrene pyrophora (Hampson, 1919)
