= Timyra orthadia =

Scientific classification
- Domain: Eukaryota
- Kingdom: Animalia
- Phylum: Arthropoda
- Class: Insecta
- Order: Lepidoptera
- Family: Lecithoceridae
- Genus: Timyra
- Species: T. orthadia

Binomial name
- Timyra orthadia Meyrick, 1906

Species of moth

Timyra orthadia is a moth in the family Lecithoceridae, described by Edward Meyrick in 1906 from Sri Lanka.

The wingspan is 16–18 mm. The forewings are whitish ochreous with a narrow dark fuscous basal fascia and two broad rather dark fuscous fasciae at about one-third and two-thirds, the first somewhat narrowed toward the costa, the second rather oblique, more or less constricted in the disc, beneath dilated and confluent posteriorly with a broad dark fuscous suffusion or sprinkling in the disc.

Between these fasciae is an undefined oblique median line of dark fuscous sprinkles and a dark fuscous terminal streak, thickened at the apex. The hindwings are fuscous, in males with a broad median longitudinal ochreous-yellow band, including a deep central groove, and a subdorsal groove enclosing an ochreous-yellow hair-pencil from the base.
