= Timyra dipsalea =

Scientific classification
- Domain: Eukaryota
- Kingdom: Animalia
- Phylum: Arthropoda
- Class: Insecta
- Order: Lepidoptera
- Family: Lecithoceridae
- Genus: Timyra
- Species: T. dipsalea

Binomial name
- Timyra dipsalea Meyrick, 1908

Species of moth

Timyra dipsalea is a moth in the family Lecithoceridae. It was described by Edward Meyrick in 1908. It is found in Assam, India.

The wingspan is 17–19 mm. The forewings are fuscous, sprinkled with fuscous-whitish scales tipped with blackish and with a suffused whitish-ochreous streak along the dorsum. There are some raised scales in the disc near the base. The hindwings are whitish-ochreous, towards the apex tinged with fuscous and with a subdorsal groove containing an expansible pencil of very long pale ochreous-yellowish hairs.
