= Donacoscaptes =

Scientific classification
- Domain: Eukaryota
- Kingdom: Animalia
- Phylum: Arthropoda
- Class: Insecta
- Order: Lepidoptera
- Family: Crambidae
- Subfamily: Crambinae
- Tribe: Haimbachiini
- Genus: Donacoscaptes; Zeller, 1877

Genus of moths

Donacoscaptes is a genus of moths of the family Crambidae.

== Species ==
- Donacoscaptes albimarginalis (Hampson, 1919)
- Donacoscaptes albivenalis (Hampson, 1919)
- Donacoscaptes alfoldellus (Schaus, 1922)
- Donacoscaptes aracalis (Schaus, 1934)
- Donacoscaptes arenalis (Hampson, 1919)
- Donacoscaptes atrisparsalis (Hampson, 1919)
- Donacoscaptes attenuata (Hampson, 1919)
- Donacoscaptes berthellus (Schaus in Dyar, 1911)
- Donacoscaptes calamistis (Hampson, 1919)
- Donacoscaptes carnealis (Hampson, 1919)
- Donacoscaptes chabilalis (Schaus, 1934)
- Donacoscaptes cynedradellus (Schaus, 1922)
- Donacoscaptes diletantellus (Dyar, 1912)
- Donacoscaptes duomita (Dyar, 1912)
- Donacoscaptes evanidella (Schaus, 1913)
- Donacoscaptes flavilinealis (Hampson, 1919)
- Donacoscaptes fulvescens (Hampson, 1919)
- Donacoscaptes interlineatus (Zeller, 1881)
- Donacoscaptes leptigrammalis (Hampson, 1919)
- Donacoscaptes leucocraspis (Hampson, 1919)
- Donacoscaptes marcella (Schaus, 1913)
- Donacoscaptes micralis (Hampson, 1919)
- Donacoscaptes monodisa (Dyar, 1914)
- Donacoscaptes obliquilineellus (Hampson, 1896)
- Donacoscaptes obliquistrialis (Hampson, 1919)
- Donacoscaptes phlebitalis (Hampson, 1919)
- Donacoscaptes pinosa (Zeller, 1881)
- Donacoscaptes semivittalis (Dognin, 1907)
- Donacoscaptes unipunctella (Bleszynski, 1961)
- Donacoscaptes validus (Zeller, 1877)
