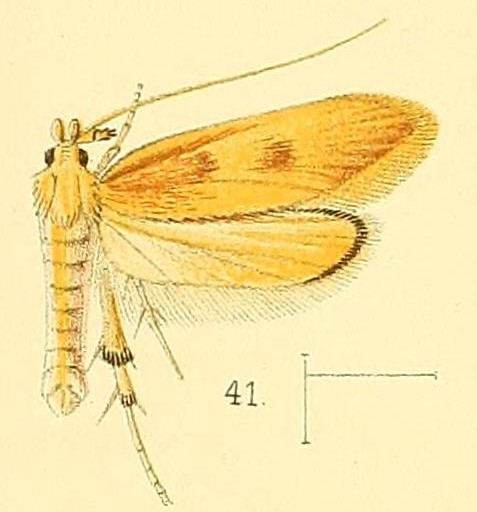
- Illustration of Timyra extranea

Scientific classification
- Kingdom: Animalia
- Phylum: Arthropoda
- Clade: Pancrustacea
- Class: Insecta
- Order: Lepidoptera
- Family: Lecithoceridae
- Genus: Timyra; Walker, 1864

Synonyms
- Uipsa Walker, 1864

= Timyra =

Genus of moths

Timyra is a genus of moths in the family Lecithoceridae.

== Species ==
- Timyra aeolocoma Meyrick, 1939
- Timyra alloptila Meyrick, 1916
- Timyra antichira Wu & Park, 1999
- Timyra aulonitis Meyrick, 1908
- Timyra autarcha Meyrick, 1908
- Timyra caulisivena Wu & Park, 1999
- Timyra cicinnota Meyrick, 1916
- Timyra cingalensis Walsingham, [1886]
- Timyra citrinodema Wu & Park, 1999
- Timyra crassella (Felder & Rogenhofer, 1875)
- Timyra dipsalea Meyrick, 1908
- Timyra extranea Walsingham, 1891
- Timyra floccula Bradley, 1965
- Timyra irrorella (Walsingham, [1886])
- Timyra lecticaria Meyrick, 1916
- Timyra machlas Meyrick, 1905
- Timyra marmaritis Meyrick, 1906
- Timyra metallanthes Meyrick, 1905
- Timyra oculinota Wu & Park, 1999
- Timyra orthadia Meyrick, 1906
- Timyra parochra Meyrick, 1906
- Timyra pastas Meyrick, 1908
- Timyra peronetris Meyrick, 1906
- Timyra phorcis Meyrick, 1908
- Timyra phycisella Walker, 1864
- Timyra praeceptrix Meyrick, 1910
- Timyra pristica Meyrick, 1916
- Timyra schoenota Meyrick, 1908
- Timyra selmatias Meyrick, 1908
- Timyra stachyophora Meyrick, 1908
- Timyra stasiotica Meyrick, 1908
- Timyra stenomacra Wu & Park, 1999
- Timyra temenodes Meyrick, 1922
- Timyra tinctella (Walsingham, [1886])
- Timyra toxastis Meyrick, 1908
- Timyra xanthaula Meyrick, 1908
