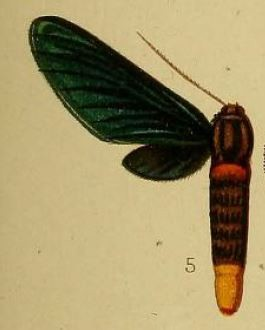
- Pseudmelisa chalybsa

Scientific classification
- Kingdom: Animalia
- Phylum: Arthropoda
- Class: Insecta
- Order: Lepidoptera
- Superfamily: Noctuoidea
- Family: Erebidae
- Subfamily: Arctiinae
- Tribe: Syntomini
- Genus: Pseudmelisa; Hampson, 1910

Synonyms
- Pseudomelisa Zerny, 1914

= Pseudmelisa =

Genus of moths

Pseudmelisa is a genus of moths in the family Erebidae.

== Species ==
- Pseudmelisa chalybsa Hampson, 1910
- Pseudmelisa demiavis Kaye, 1919
- Pseudmelisa rubrosignata Kiriakoff, 1957
