= Donacoscaptes chabilalis =

Scientific classification
- Domain: Eukaryota
- Kingdom: Animalia
- Phylum: Arthropoda
- Class: Insecta
- Order: Lepidoptera
- Family: Crambidae
- Subfamily: Crambinae
- Tribe: Haimbachiini
- Genus: Donacoscaptes
- Species: D. chabilalis

Binomial name
- Donacoscaptes chabilalis (Schaus, 1934)

Synonyms
- Chilo chabilalis Schaus, 1934

Species of moth

Donacoscaptes chabilalis is a moth in the family Crambidae. It was described by Schaus in 1934. It is found in Brazil (Rio de Janeiro).
