= Timyra pastas =

Scientific classification
- Domain: Eukaryota
- Kingdom: Animalia
- Phylum: Arthropoda
- Class: Insecta
- Order: Lepidoptera
- Family: Lecithoceridae
- Genus: Timyra
- Species: T. pastas

Binomial name
- Timyra pastas Meyrick, 1908

Species of moth

Timyra pastas is a moth in the family Lecithoceridae. It was described by Edward Meyrick in 1908. It is found in southern India.

The wingspan is 19–23 mm. The forewings are whitish ochreous yellowish irregularly sprinkled with blackish and dark fuscous. There is a small blackish basal spot and a broad suffused dark fuscous antemedian fascia. A broad suffused fascia of dark fuscous and black sprinkles occupies the apical fourth of the wing. The hindwings are dark fuscous, in males with a short subdorsal groove, beneath which is a short fringe of whitish-ochreous hairs.
