= Donacoscaptes unipunctella =

Scientific classification
- Domain: Eukaryota
- Kingdom: Animalia
- Phylum: Arthropoda
- Class: Insecta
- Order: Lepidoptera
- Family: Crambidae
- Subfamily: Crambinae
- Tribe: Haimbachiini
- Genus: Donacoscaptes
- Species: D. unipunctella

Binomial name
- Donacoscaptes unipunctella (Błeszyński, 1961)

Synonyms
- Eoreuma unipunctella Błeszyński, 1961; Erupa unipunctalis Hampson, 1919

Species of moth

Donacoscaptes unipunctella is a moth in the family Crambidae. It was described by Stanisław Błeszyński in 1961. It is found in Paraná, Brazil.
