= Timyra stachyophora =

Scientific classification
- Domain: Eukaryota
- Kingdom: Animalia
- Phylum: Arthropoda
- Class: Insecta
- Order: Lepidoptera
- Family: Lecithoceridae
- Genus: Timyra
- Species: T. stachyophora

Binomial name
- Timyra stachyophora Meyrick, 1908

Species of moth

Timyra stachyophora is a moth in the family Lecithoceridae. It was described by Edward Meyrick in 1908. It is found in Sri Lanka.

The wingspan is 18–19 mm. The forewings are whitish ochreous, irregularly mixed with fuscous and sprinkled with blackish. There is a slender dark fuscous basal fascia, followed by a narrow clear whitish-ochreous fascia. There is also a curved slightly oblique clear whitish-ochreous transverse median line and an irregular dark fuscous line around the apex and termen. The hindwings are whitish ochreous with a narrow fuscous streak along the termen, sometimes interrupted, and a fuscous patch along the posterior half of the costa. The submedian and subdorsal grooves are suffused with light ochreous yellowish, the latter with a very long expansible pencil of whitish ochreous hairs.
