= Thyrogonia =

Scientific classification
- Kingdom: Animalia
- Phylum: Arthropoda
- Class: Insecta
- Order: Lepidoptera
- Superfamily: Noctuoidea
- Family: Erebidae
- Subfamily: Arctiinae
- Genus: Thyrogonia; Hampson, 1898

Genus of moths

Thyrogonia is a genus of moth in the subfamily Arctiinae. It was erected in 1898.

== Species ==
- Thyrogonia aurantiiventris Kiriakoff, 1953
- Thyrogonia cyaneotincta Hampson, 1918
- Thyrogonia efulensis Holland, 1898
- Thyrogonia hampsoni Kiriakoff, 1953
