= Donacoscaptes duomita =

Scientific classification
- Kingdom: Animalia
- Phylum: Arthropoda
- Class: Insecta
- Order: Lepidoptera
- Family: Crambidae
- Subfamily: Crambinae
- Tribe: Haimbachiini
- Genus: Donacoscaptes
- Species: D. duomita

Binomial name
- Donacoscaptes duomita (Dyar, 1912)

Synonyms
- Chilo duomita Dyar, 1912

Species of moth

Donacoscaptes duomita is a moth in the Crambidae family. It was described by Harrison Gray Dyar Jr. in 1912. It is found in Mexico.
