= Donacoscaptes validus =

Scientific classification
- Kingdom: Animalia
- Phylum: Arthropoda
- Clade: Pancrustacea
- Class: Insecta
- Order: Lepidoptera
- Family: Crambidae
- Subfamily: Crambinae
- Tribe: Haimbachiini
- Genus: Donacoscaptes
- Species: D. validus

Binomial name
- Donacoscaptes validus (Zeller, 1877)

Synonyms
- Chilo validus Zeller, 1877

Species of moth

Donacoscaptes validus is a moth in the family Crambidae. It was described by Zeller in 1877. It is found in Panama.
