= Timyra metallanthes =

Scientific classification
- Domain: Eukaryota
- Kingdom: Animalia
- Phylum: Arthropoda
- Class: Insecta
- Order: Lepidoptera
- Family: Lecithoceridae
- Genus: Timyra
- Species: T. metallanthes

Binomial name
- Timyra metallanthes Meyrick, 1905

Species of moth

Timyra metallanthes is a moth in the family Lecithoceridae. It was described by Edward Meyrick in 1905. It is found in Sri Lanka.

The wingspan is about 19 mm. The forewings are fuscous, sprinkled with whitish ochreous except on the basal and terminal areas. There is an indistinct cloudy whitish-ochreous fascia at one-fourth and an orange fascia before three-fourths, dilated on the costa. The hindwings are fuscous, paler and thinly scaled towards the base, with an ochreous-yellowish hair-pencil.
