= Timyra alloptila =

Scientific classification
- Domain: Eukaryota
- Kingdom: Animalia
- Phylum: Arthropoda
- Class: Insecta
- Order: Lepidoptera
- Family: Lecithoceridae
- Genus: Timyra
- Species: T. alloptila

Binomial name
- Timyra alloptila Meyrick, 1916

Species of moth

Timyra alloptila is a moth in the family Lecithoceridae. It was described by Edward Meyrick in 1916. It is found in Sri Lanka.

The wingspan is 24–25 mm. The forewings are ochreous yellow and the markings are dark purple fuscous, with a streak along the costa from the base to two-fifths, with an erect partly yellow tuft beneath it before its middle and a small raised spot on the dorsum beneath this tuft. There is a suffused trapezoidal blotch on the dorsum beyond the middle, and one on the costa at three-fourths, nearly meeting. There is a more or less developed narrow terminal fascia. The hindwings light ochreous yellow, the costa and tornus suffused with grey and a deep plical groove filled with long expansible yellow-whitish hairs.
