= Donacoscaptes calamistis =

Scientific classification
- Kingdom: Animalia
- Phylum: Arthropoda
- Class: Insecta
- Order: Lepidoptera
- Family: Crambidae
- Subfamily: Crambinae
- Tribe: Haimbachiini
- Genus: Donacoscaptes
- Species: D. calamistis

Binomial name
- Donacoscaptes calamistis (Hampson, 1919)

Synonyms
- Chilo calamistis Hampson, 1919

Species of moth

Donacoscaptes calamistis is a moth in the family Crambidae. It was described by George Hampson in 1919. It is found in Argentina.
