= Thyranthrene obliquizona =

Scientific classification
- Kingdom: Animalia
- Phylum: Arthropoda
- Class: Insecta
- Order: Lepidoptera
- Family: Sesiidae
- Genus: Thyranthrene
- Species: T. obliquizona

Binomial name
- Thyranthrene obliquizona (Hampson, 1910)

Synonyms
- Lepidopoda obliquizona Hampson, 1910

Species of moth

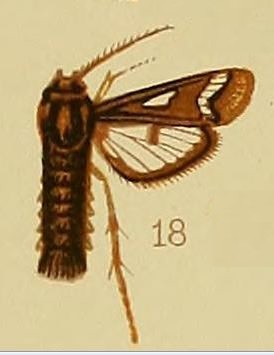
Thyranthrene obliquizona

Thyranthrene obliquizona is a moth of the family Sesiidae. It is known from Zambia.
