= Donacoscaptes monodisa =

Scientific classification
- Kingdom: Animalia
- Phylum: Arthropoda
- Class: Insecta
- Order: Lepidoptera
- Family: Crambidae
- Subfamily: Crambinae
- Tribe: Haimbachiini
- Genus: Donacoscaptes
- Species: D. monodisa

Binomial name
- Donacoscaptes monodisa (Dyar, 1914)

Synonyms
- Ubida monodisa Dyar, 1914

Species of moth

Donacoscaptes monodisa is a moth in the family Crambidae. It was described by Harrison Gray Dyar Jr. in 1914. It is found in Panama.
