= Timyra machlas =

Scientific classification
- Domain: Eukaryota
- Kingdom: Animalia
- Phylum: Arthropoda
- Class: Insecta
- Order: Lepidoptera
- Family: Lecithoceridae
- Genus: Timyra
- Species: T. machlas

Binomial name
- Timyra machlas Meyrick, 1905

Species of moth

Timyra machlas is a moth in the family Lecithoceridae. It was described by Edward Meyrick in 1905. It is found in Sri Lanka.

The wingspan is 20–22 mm. The forewings are light brown, mixed with darker and the basal area mixed with orange, and with orange median and plical streaks to the middle. In males, there is a sub-basal tuft of erect scales. Beyond the middle is a broad orange slightly oblique transverse fascia and the posterior area has white lines on the veins, and along the costa and termen. The hindwings are whitish ochreous in males, posteriorly suffused with fuscous. The hindwings of the females are fuscous.
