= Timyra toxastis =

Scientific classification
- Domain: Eukaryota
- Kingdom: Animalia
- Phylum: Arthropoda
- Class: Insecta
- Order: Lepidoptera
- Family: Lecithoceridae
- Genus: Timyra
- Species: T. toxastis

Binomial name
- Timyra toxastis Meyrick, 1908

Species of moth

Timyra toxastis is a moth in the family Lecithoceridae. It was described by Edward Meyrick in 1908. It is found in southern India.

The wingspan is 17–20 mm. The forewings are brown sprinkled with dark fuscous and with narrow orange subcostal and submedian streaks from the base, not reaching the middle. There is a slender curved rather oblique white median fascia. The veins on the posterior third of the wing are marked with irregular white streaks and there is a slender white streak along the posterior part of the costa and termen. The hindwings are grey.
