= Thyranthrene pyrophora =

Scientific classification
- Kingdom: Animalia
- Phylum: Arthropoda
- Class: Insecta
- Order: Lepidoptera
- Family: Sesiidae
- Genus: Thyranthrene
- Species: T. pyrophora

Binomial name
- Thyranthrene pyrophora (Hampson, 1919)

Synonyms
- Homogyna pyrophora Hampson, 1919

Species of moth

Thyranthrene pyrophora is a moth of the family Sesiidae. It is known from South Africa.
