= Aurotalis hermione =

Scientific classification
- Kingdom: Animalia
- Phylum: Arthropoda
- Clade: Pancrustacea
- Class: Insecta
- Order: Lepidoptera
- Family: Crambidae
- Subfamily: Crambinae
- Tribe: Ancylolomiini
- Genus: Aurotalis
- Species: A. hermione

Binomial name
- Aurotalis hermione Bassi, 1999

Species of moth

Aurotalis hermione is a moth in the family Crambidae. It was described by Graziano Bassi in 1999. It is found in Zambia.
