= Timyra irrorella =

Scientific classification
- Domain: Eukaryota
- Kingdom: Animalia
- Phylum: Arthropoda
- Class: Insecta
- Order: Lepidoptera
- Family: Lecithoceridae
- Genus: Timyra
- Species: T. irrorella

Binomial name
- Timyra irrorella (Walsingham, [1886])

Synonyms
- Tipha irrorella Walsingham, [1886]

Species of moth

Timyra irrorella is a moth in the family Lecithoceridae. It was described by Thomas de Grey in 1886. It is found in Sri Lanka.

The wingspan is about 17.5 mm. The forewings are creamy-white, profusely sprinkled with purple scales. The base of the costal margin and the outer third of the wing are more thickly covered than the remainder of the wing, so that the ground colour is partially obliterated. A narrow orange-ochreous border runs around the apex and apical margin at the base of the purplish-grey fringes. The hindwings are grey, with pale ochreous fringes tipped with shining grey.
