= Donacoscaptes pinosa =

Scientific classification
- Kingdom: Animalia
- Phylum: Arthropoda
- Clade: Pancrustacea
- Class: Insecta
- Order: Lepidoptera
- Family: Crambidae
- Subfamily: Crambinae
- Tribe: Haimbachiini
- Genus: Donacoscaptes
- Species: D. pinosa

Binomial name
- Donacoscaptes pinosa (Zeller, 1881)

Synonyms
- Diatraea pinosa Zeller, 1881

Species of moth

Donacoscaptes pinosa is a moth in the family Crambidae. It was described by Zeller in 1881. It is found in Colombia.
