= Sebrus =

Scientific classification
- Domain: Eukaryota
- Kingdom: Animalia
- Phylum: Arthropoda
- Class: Insecta
- Order: Lepidoptera
- Family: Crambidae
- Subfamily: Crambinae
- Tribe: Crambini
- Genus: Sebrus; Bleszynski, 1970

Genus of moths

Sebrus is a genus of moths of the family Crambidae.

== Species ==
- Sebrus absconditus Bassi, 1995
- Sebrus amandus Bleszynski, 1970
- Sebrus argus Bassi, 1995
- Sebrus perdentellus (Hampson, 1919)
- Sebrus pseudosparsellus (Bleszynski, 1961)
