= Monopetalotaxis candescens =

Scientific classification
- Domain: Eukaryota
- Kingdom: Animalia
- Phylum: Arthropoda
- Class: Insecta
- Order: Lepidoptera
- Family: Sesiidae
- Genus: Monopetalotaxis
- Species: M. candescens

Binomial name
- Monopetalotaxis candescens (Felder, 1874)

Synonyms
- Trochilina candescens Felder, 1874

Species of moth

Monopetalotaxis candescens is a moth of the family Sesiidae. It is known from South Africa.

The larvae bore the roots of Aspalathus linearis.
