= Aurotalis dionisa =

Scientific classification
- Kingdom: Animalia
- Phylum: Arthropoda
- Clade: Pancrustacea
- Class: Insecta
- Order: Lepidoptera
- Family: Crambidae
- Subfamily: Crambinae
- Tribe: Ancylolomiini
- Genus: Aurotalis
- Species: A. dionisa

Binomial name
- Aurotalis dionisa Błeszyński, 1970

Species of moth

Aurotalis dionisa is a moth in the family Crambidae. It was described by Stanisław Błeszyński in 1970. It is found in Angola.
