= Stenilema =

Scientific classification
- Kingdom: Animalia
- Phylum: Arthropoda
- Class: Insecta
- Order: Lepidoptera
- Superfamily: Noctuoidea
- Family: Erebidae
- Subfamily: Arctiinae
- Tribe: Lithosiini
- Genus: Stenilema; Hampson, 1909

Genus of moths

Stenilema is a genus of moths in the subfamily Arctiinae.

== Species ==
- Stenilema aurantiaca Hampson, 1909
- Stenilema quadrinotata Kiriakoff, 1965
- Stenilema subaurantiaca Strand, 1912
