= Thyrogonia efulensis =

Scientific classification
- Kingdom: Animalia
- Phylum: Arthropoda
- Clade: Pancrustacea
- Class: Insecta
- Order: Lepidoptera
- Superfamily: Noctuoidea
- Family: Erebidae
- Subfamily: Arctiinae
- Genus: Thyrogonia
- Species: T. efulensis

Binomial name
- Thyrogonia efulensis (Holland, 1898)

Synonyms
- Syntomis efulensis Holland, 1898

Species of moth

Thyrogonia efulensis is a moth in the subfamily Arctiinae. It was described by William Jacob Holland in 1898. It is found in Cameroon.
