= Monopetalotaxis =

Scientific classification
- Kingdom: Animalia
- Phylum: Arthropoda
- Class: Insecta
- Order: Lepidoptera
- Family: Sesiidae
- Subfamily: Sesiinae
- Genus: Monopetalotaxis; Wallengren, 1859

Species
- See text

Genus of moths

Monopetalotaxis is a genus of moths in the family Sesiidae.

== Species ==
- Monopetalotaxis candescens (Felder, 1874)
- Monopetalotaxis chalciphora (Hampson, 1919)
- Monopetalotaxis doleriformis (Walker, 1856)
- Monopetalotaxis luteopunctata (de Freina, 2011)
- Monopetalotaxis pyrocraspis (Hampson, 1910)
