= Timyra phorcis =

Scientific classification
- Domain: Eukaryota
- Kingdom: Animalia
- Phylum: Arthropoda
- Class: Insecta
- Order: Lepidoptera
- Family: Lecithoceridae
- Genus: Timyra
- Species: T. phorcis

Binomial name
- Timyra phorcis Meyrick, 1908

Species of moth

Timyra phorcis is a moth in the family Lecithoceridae. It was described by Edward Meyrick in 1908. It is found in Sri Lanka.

The wingspan is 13–14 mm. The forewings are ochreous whitish with a narrow dark fuscous basal fascia and a very broad rather dark purplish-fuscous antemedian fascia, considerably narrowed towards the costa. There is an ill-defined triangular spot of dark fuscous sprinkles on the costa beyond the middle, and a sub-triangular dark fuscous spot on the tornus, connected anteriorly by a pale ochreous-yellowish streak, the fascia of ground colour which precedes these is bisected by an undefined line of dark fuscous scales. The apical area between and beyond these is irregularly strewn with dark fuscous scales. The hindwings are grey, lighter towards the base.
