= Timyra peronetris =

Scientific classification
- Domain: Eukaryota
- Kingdom: Animalia
- Phylum: Arthropoda
- Class: Insecta
- Order: Lepidoptera
- Family: Lecithoceridae
- Genus: Timyra
- Species: T. peronetris

Binomial name
- Timyra peronetris Meyrick, 1906

Species of moth

Timyra peronetris is a moth in the family Lecithoceridae. It was described by Edward Meyrick in 1906. It is found in Sri Lanka.

The wingspan is 29–30 mm. The forewings are dark fuscous, with a few whitish-ochreous scales and a tuft of scales in the disc near the base, as well as a transverse light ochreous-yellow mark at three-fifths, somewhat dilated upwards, reaching from near the costa to below the middle. The hindwings are ochreous yellow with a moderate suffused dark fuscous streak along the costa, dilated at the apex. There is a suffused dark fuscous streak proceeding from the basal tuft of scales along the dorsum and termen to above the middle, widest at the tornus and gradually attenuated. A groove is found along the fold, enclosing an exceedingly long expansible pale ochreous-yellowish hair-pencil.
