= Hibrildes =

Scientific classification
- Kingdom: Animalia
- Phylum: Arthropoda
- Class: Insecta
- Order: Lepidoptera
- Family: Eupterotidae
- Genus: Hibrildes; Druce, [1888]

Synonyms
- Anengya Karsch, 1895; Hibrildis Janse, 1917; Hibrildus Berger, 1958; Hybrildes Grünberg, 1912

Genus of moths

Hibrildes is a genus of moths in the family Eupterotidae.

== Species ==
- Hibrildes crawshayi Butler, 1896
- Hibrildes norax Druce, 1888

== Former species ==
- Hibrildes venosa Kirby, 1896
