= Aurotalis =

Scientific classification
- Domain: Eukaryota
- Kingdom: Animalia
- Phylum: Arthropoda
- Class: Insecta
- Order: Lepidoptera
- Family: Crambidae
- Subfamily: Crambinae
- Tribe: Ancylolomiini
- Genus: Aurotalis; Bleszynski, 1970

Genus of moths

Aurotalis is a genus of moths of the family Crambidae.

== Species ==
- Aurotalis delicatalis (Hampson, 1919)
- Aurotalis dionisa Bleszynski, 1970
- Aurotalis hermione Bassi, 1999
- Aurotalis nigrisquamalis (Hampson, 1919)
- Aurotalis similis Bassi, 1999
