= Thyrogonia aurantiiventris =

Scientific classification
- Kingdom: Animalia
- Phylum: Arthropoda
- Class: Insecta
- Order: Lepidoptera
- Superfamily: Noctuoidea
- Family: Erebidae
- Subfamily: Arctiinae
- Genus: Thyrogonia
- Species: T. aurantiiventris

Binomial name
- Thyrogonia aurantiiventris Kiriakoff, 1953

Species of moth

Thyrogonia aurantiiventris is a moth in the subfamily Arctiinae. It was described by Sergius G. Kiriakoff in 1953. It is found in the Democratic Republic of the Congo.
