= Timyra cicinnota =

Scientific classification
- Domain: Eukaryota
- Kingdom: Animalia
- Phylum: Arthropoda
- Class: Insecta
- Order: Lepidoptera
- Family: Lecithoceridae
- Genus: Timyra
- Species: T. cicinnota

Binomial name
- Timyra cicinnota Meyrick, 1916

Species of moth

Timyra cicinnota is a moth in the family Lecithoceridae. It was described by Edward Meyrick in 1916. It is found in Sri Lanka.

The wingspan is 21–22 mm. The forewings are rather dark fuscous and the markings are formed by whitish-ochreous suffusion. There is a moderate straight fascia at one-fourth and a slender cloudy transverse fascia in the middle, as well as a broad undefined posterior transverse band, extending nearly to the apex and termen. The hindwings are grey, in females somewhat darker and in males with a deep plical groove filled with long expansible whitish hairs.
