= Timyra autarcha =

Scientific classification
- Domain: Eukaryota
- Kingdom: Animalia
- Phylum: Arthropoda
- Class: Insecta
- Order: Lepidoptera
- Family: Lecithoceridae
- Genus: Timyra
- Species: T. autarcha

Binomial name
- Timyra autarcha Meyrick, 1908

Species of moth

Timyra autarcha is a moth in the family Lecithoceridae. It was described by Edward Meyrick in 1908. It is found in southern India.

The wingspan is 18–19 mm. The forewings are whitish ochreous with three blackish fasciae, the first narrow, the basal extended along the costa to meet the second, which is broad and antemedian, while the third is very broad, running from about two-thirds of the costa to the tornus, with a few ochreous-whitish specks, the posterior edge curved parallel to the margin of the wing. There is a deep ochreous-yellow streak along the posterior part of the costa and termen. The hindwings are dark fuscous.
