= Donacoscaptes fulvescens =

Scientific classification
- Kingdom: Animalia
- Phylum: Arthropoda
- Class: Insecta
- Order: Lepidoptera
- Family: Crambidae
- Subfamily: Crambinae
- Tribe: Haimbachiini
- Genus: Donacoscaptes
- Species: D. fulvescens

Binomial name
- Donacoscaptes fulvescens (Hampson, 1919)

Synonyms
- Doratoperas fulvescens Hampson, 1919; Chilopsis peruanellus Schaus, 1922; Morpheis peruanellus

Species of moth

Donacoscaptes fulvescens is a moth in the family Crambidae. It is found in Peru.

The wingspan is about 40 mm. The forewings are pale ochraceous buff with scattered large black scales and vinaceous-fawn shading in the cell. There is a black point at the end of the cell and a number of small terminal black points, as well as a faint brownish postmedial line. The hindwings are suffused with smoky olive grey. The costa and postmedial space are whitish.
