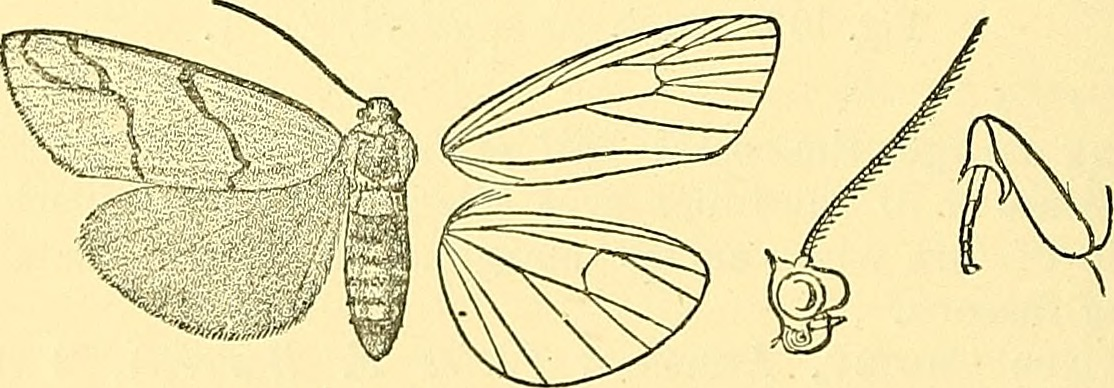
- Carcinopodia furcifasciata

Scientific classification
- Kingdom: Animalia
- Phylum: Arthropoda
- Class: Insecta
- Order: Lepidoptera
- Superfamily: Noctuoidea
- Family: Erebidae
- Subfamily: Arctiinae
- Tribe: Lithosiini
- Genus: Carcinopodia; Hampson, 1900

Synonyms
- Carsinopodia Neave, 1939

= Carcinopodia =

Genus of moths

Carcinopodia is a genus of moths in the subfamily Arctiinae. The genus was erected by George Hampson in 1900.

== Species ==
- Carcinopodia argentata
- Carcinopodia furcifasciata
- Carcinopodia schoutedeni
