= Timyra xanthaula =

Scientific classification
- Domain: Eukaryota
- Kingdom: Animalia
- Phylum: Arthropoda
- Class: Insecta
- Order: Lepidoptera
- Family: Lecithoceridae
- Genus: Timyra
- Species: T. xanthaula

Binomial name
- Timyra xanthaula Meyrick, 1908

Species of moth

Timyra xanthaula is a moth in the family Lecithoceridae. It was described by Edward Meyrick in 1908. It is found in southern India.

The wingspan is 19–22 mm. The forewings are ochreous yellowish, deeper on the margins and a moderate somewhat oblique deep ochreous-yellow median fascia, with traces of fuscous edging. There are two fuscous longitudinal lines in the disc before this, coincident towards the base, and one along the fold not reaching the fascia. There is also a series of interneural fuscous streaks on the posterior half of the wing. The hindwings are whitish ochreous, with submedian and subdorsal grooves, the latter containing expansible whitish-ochreous hairs.
