= Monopetalotaxis doleriformis =

Scientific classification
- Kingdom: Animalia
- Phylum: Arthropoda
- Class: Insecta
- Order: Lepidoptera
- Family: Sesiidae
- Genus: Monopetalotaxis
- Species: M. doleriformis

Binomial name
- Monopetalotaxis doleriformis (Walker, 1856)

Synonyms
- Aegeria doleriformis Walker, 1856; Monopetalotaxis wahlbergi Wallengren 1859; Aegeria taylori Druce, 1899

Species of moth

Monopetalotaxis doleriformis is a moth of the family Sesiidae. It is known from South Africa.

The larvae bore the roots of Aspalathus linearis.
