= Donacoscaptes obliquilineellus =

Scientific classification
- Kingdom: Animalia
- Phylum: Arthropoda
- Class: Insecta
- Order: Lepidoptera
- Family: Crambidae
- Subfamily: Crambinae
- Tribe: Haimbachiini
- Genus: Donacoscaptes
- Species: D. obliquilineellus

Binomial name
- Donacoscaptes obliquilineellus (Hampson, 1896)

Synonyms
- Chilo obliquilineellus Hampson, 1896

Species of moth

Donacoscaptes obliquilineellus is a moth in the family Crambidae. It was described by George Hampson in 1896. It is found in Rio de Janeiro, Brazil.
