= Timyra stasiotica =

Scientific classification
- Domain: Eukaryota
- Kingdom: Animalia
- Phylum: Arthropoda
- Class: Insecta
- Order: Lepidoptera
- Family: Lecithoceridae
- Genus: Timyra
- Species: T. stasiotica

Binomial name
- Timyra stasiotica Meyrick, 1908

Species of moth

Timyra stasiotica is a moth in the family Lecithoceridae. It was described by Edward Meyrick in 1908. It is found in Sri Lanka.

The wingspan is 24–28 mm. The forewings are fuscous or whitish fuscous, sprinkled with dark fuscous, sometimes sprinkled with whitish or deep ochreous, in males with a tuft of raised scales in the disc near the base. There is an indistinct rather oblique sometimes curved slender deep yellow-ochreous fascia from three-fifths of the costa to three-fourths of the dorsum, often incomplete or reduced to a small discal spot. The hindwings are whitish ochreous yellowish, the costa and the termen narrowly suffused throughout with fuscous, in males more widely towards the apex and with a submedian groove containing an expansible pencil of very long ochreous-whitish hairs.
