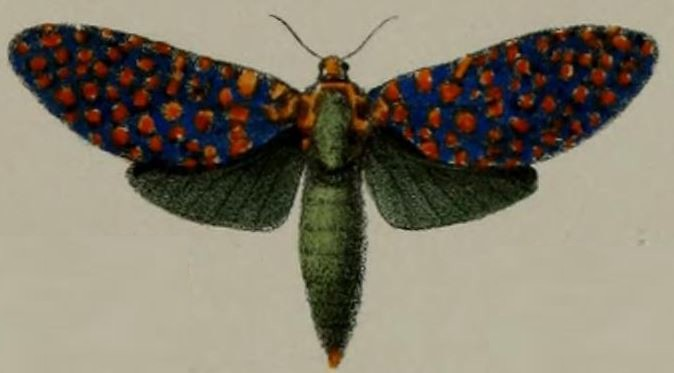

Scientific classification
- Kingdom: Animalia
- Phylum: Arthropoda
- Class: Insecta
- Order: Lepidoptera
- Family: Cossidae
- Genus: Eulophonotus
- Species: E. stephania

Binomial name
- Eulophonotus stephania (H. Druce, 1887)

Synonyms
- Zeuzera stephania H. Druce, 1887; Eulophonotus stephanius

= Eulophonotus stephania =

Species of moth

Eulophonotus stephania is a moth in the family Cossidae first described by Herbert Druce in 1887. It is found in Malawi, Mozambique, South Africa, Zambia and Zimbabwe.
