= Scopula sublobata =

Scientific classification
- Domain: Eukaryota
- Kingdom: Animalia
- Phylum: Arthropoda
- Class: Insecta
- Order: Lepidoptera
- Family: Geometridae
- Genus: Scopula
- Species: S. sublobata

Binomial name
- Scopula sublobata (Warren, 1898)

Synonyms
- Craspedia sublobata Warren, 1898; Emmiltis khakiata Warren, 1905

Species of geometer moth in subfamily Sterrhinae

Scopula sublobata is a moth of the family Geometridae. It is found in Malawi and South Africa.
