= Scopula oenoloma =

Scientific classification
- Kingdom: Animalia
- Phylum: Arthropoda
- Clade: Pancrustacea
- Class: Insecta
- Order: Lepidoptera
- Family: Geometridae
- Genus: Scopula
- Species: S. oenoloma

Binomial name
- Scopula oenoloma Prout, 1932

Species of geometer moth in subfamily Sterrhinae

Scopula oenoloma is a moth of the family Geometridae. It is found in Malawi.
