= Thyrogonia cyaneotincta =

Scientific classification
- Kingdom: Animalia
- Phylum: Arthropoda
- Class: Insecta
- Order: Lepidoptera
- Superfamily: Noctuoidea
- Family: Erebidae
- Subfamily: Arctiinae
- Genus: Thyrogonia
- Species: T. cyaneotincta

Binomial name
- Thyrogonia cyaneotincta Hampson, 1918

Species of moth

Thyrogonia cyaneotincta is a moth in the subfamily Arctiinae. It was described by George Hampson in 1918. It is found in Malawi.
