= Stenilema aurantiaca =

Scientific classification
- Kingdom: Animalia
- Phylum: Arthropoda
- Clade: Pancrustacea
- Class: Insecta
- Order: Lepidoptera
- Superfamily: Noctuoidea
- Family: Erebidae
- Subfamily: Arctiinae
- Genus: Stenilema
- Species: S. aurantiaca

Binomial name
- Stenilema aurantiaca Hampson, 1909

Species of moth

Stenilema aurantiaca is a moth in the subfamily Arctiinae. It was described by George Hampson in 1909. It is found in Ethiopia and Malawi.
