= Timyra aeolocoma =

Scientific classification
- Kingdom: Animalia
- Phylum: Arthropoda
- Class: Insecta
- Order: Lepidoptera
- Family: Lecithoceridae
- Genus: Timyra
- Species: T. aeolocoma

Binomial name
- Timyra aeolocoma Meyrick, 1939

Species of moth

Timyra aeolocoma is a moth in the family Lecithoceridae. It was described by Edward Meyrick in 1939. It is found in Malawi.
