= Sebrus perdentellus =

Scientific classification
- Kingdom: Animalia
- Phylum: Arthropoda
- Clade: Pancrustacea
- Class: Insecta
- Order: Lepidoptera
- Family: Crambidae
- Subfamily: Crambinae
- Tribe: Crambini
- Genus: Sebrus
- Species: S. perdentellus

Binomial name
- Sebrus perdentellus (Hampson, 1919)

Synonyms
- Crambus perdentellus Hampson, 1919

Species of moth

Sebrus perdentellus is a moth in the family Crambidae. It was described by George Hampson in 1919. It is found in Malawi.
