= Stenilema subaurantiaca =

Scientific classification
- Domain: Eukaryota
- Kingdom: Animalia
- Phylum: Arthropoda
- Class: Insecta
- Order: Lepidoptera
- Superfamily: Noctuoidea
- Family: Erebidae
- Subfamily: Arctiinae
- Genus: Stenilema
- Species: S. subaurantiaca

Binomial name
- Stenilema subaurantiaca Strand, 1912

Species of moth

Stenilema subaurantiaca is a moth in the subfamily Arctiinae. It was described by Strand in 1912. It is found in Malawi.
