= Pseudmelisa rubrosignata =

Scientific classification
- Kingdom: Animalia
- Phylum: Arthropoda
- Class: Insecta
- Order: Lepidoptera
- Superfamily: Noctuoidea
- Family: Erebidae
- Subfamily: Arctiinae
- Genus: Pseudmelisa
- Species: P. rubrosignata

Binomial name
- Pseudmelisa rubrosignata Kiriakoff, 1957

Species of moth

Pseudmelisa rubrosignata is a moth in the family Erebidae. It was described by Sergius G. Kiriakoff in 1957. It is found in Malawi and Tanzania.
