= Aurotalis delicatalis =

Scientific classification
- Kingdom: Animalia
- Phylum: Arthropoda
- Clade: Pancrustacea
- Class: Insecta
- Order: Lepidoptera
- Family: Crambidae
- Subfamily: Crambinae
- Tribe: Ancylolomiini
- Genus: Aurotalis
- Species: A. delicatalis

Binomial name
- Aurotalis delicatalis (Hampson, 1919)

Synonyms
- Ommatopteryx delicatalis Hampson, 1919

Species of moth

Aurotalis delicatalis is a moth in the family Crambidae. It was described by George Hampson in 1919. It is found in Malawi.
