= Scopula internata =

Scientific classification
- Kingdom: Animalia
- Phylum: Arthropoda
- Class: Insecta
- Order: Lepidoptera
- Family: Geometridae
- Genus: Scopula
- Species: S. internata

Binomial name
- Scopula internata (Guenée, [1858])

Synonyms
- Acidalia internata Guenee, 1858; Acidalia illiturata Walker, 1863; Synelys pudens Warren, 1905; Acidalia pulverosaria Walker, 1863; Acidalia strigulifera Walker, 1861

Species of geometer moth in subfamily Sterrhinae

Scopula internata is a moth of the family Geometridae. It is found in the Democratic Republic of Congo, Gambia, Kenya, Malawi, South Africa, Tanzania, Uganda and Zambia.

== Subspecies ==
- Scopula internata internata (South Africa, Gambia)
- Scopula internata praeruptorum Prout, 1920 (Democratic Republic of Congo, Kenya, Tanzania, Uganda)
