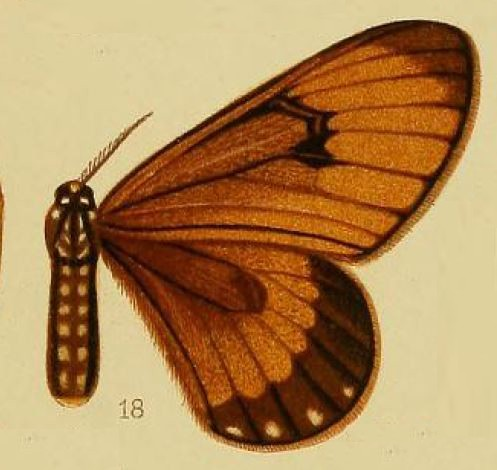

Scientific classification
- Kingdom: Animalia
- Phylum: Arthropoda
- Class: Insecta
- Order: Lepidoptera
- Family: Eupterotidae
- Genus: Hibrildes
- Species: H. crawshayi

Binomial name
- Hibrildes crawshayi Butler, 1896

Synonyms
- Hibrildes ansorgei albescens Joicey & Talbot, 1924; Hibrildes albopunctata Bethune-Baker, 1915; Hibrildes ansorgei Kirby, 1896; Hibrildes ansorgei albescens f. bicolor Talbot, 1928; Hibrildes craushayi Hampson, 1910; Hibrildes venosa f. fuscata Hering, 1926; Hibrildes neavi Hampson, 1910; Hibrildes venosa Kirby, 1896

= Hibrildes crawshayi =

Species of moth

Hibrildes crawshayi is a moth in the family Eupterotidae. It was described by Arthur Gardiner Butler in 1896. It is found in the Democratic Republic of the Congo (Katanga), Malawi, South Africa, Tanzania, Zambia and Zimbabwe.

The wingspan is 61 mm. Adults are semitransparent rosy tawny, with slender black veins. The forewings have a short black bar across the end of the cell and the external border is dark grey, dentate-sinuate internally, broad at the apex and narrow at the external angle. The hindwings have a black discocellular dash, the external border rather broadly blackish, enclosing six spots of the ground colour.
