= Pyrausta distictalis =

Scientific classification
- Kingdom: Animalia
- Phylum: Arthropoda
- Class: Insecta
- Order: Lepidoptera
- Family: Crambidae
- Genus: Pyrausta
- Species: P. distictalis

Binomial name
- Pyrausta distictalis Hampson, 1918

Species of moth

Pyrausta distictalis is a moth in the family Crambidae. It was described by George Hampson in 1918. It is found in Malawi.
