= Leptonoma =

Scientific classification
- Kingdom: Animalia
- Phylum: Arthropoda
- Clade: Pancrustacea
- Class: Insecta
- Order: Lepidoptera
- Family: Tineidae
- Genus: Leptonoma; Meyrick, 1916
- Species: L. citrozona

Binomial name
- Leptonoma citrozona Meyrick, 1916

Genus of moths

Leptonoma is a moth genus, belonging to the family Tineidae. It contains only one species, Leptonoma citrozona, which is found in Malawi.
