= Amata ceres =

Scientific classification
- Domain: Eukaryota
- Kingdom: Animalia
- Phylum: Arthropoda
- Class: Insecta
- Order: Lepidoptera
- Superfamily: Noctuoidea
- Family: Erebidae
- Subfamily: Arctiinae
- Genus: Amata
- Species: A. ceres

Binomial name
- Amata ceres (Oberthür, 1878)

Synonyms
- Syntomis ceres Oberthür, 1878

Species of moth

Amata ceres is a moth of the subfamily Arctiinae. It was described by Charles Oberthür in 1878. It is found in Malawi and Tanzania.
