= Eilema sanguicosta =

Scientific classification
- Domain: Eukaryota
- Kingdom: Animalia
- Phylum: Arthropoda
- Class: Insecta
- Order: Lepidoptera
- Superfamily: Noctuoidea
- Family: Erebidae
- Subfamily: Arctiinae
- Genus: Eilema
- Species: E. sanguicosta

Binomial name
- Eilema sanguicosta (Hampson, 1901)

Synonyms
- Ilema sanguicosta Hampson, 1901; Eilema nyasana Strand, 1912

Species of moth

Eilema sanguicosta is a moth of the subfamily Arctiinae. It was described by George Hampson in 1901. It is found in the Democratic Republic of the Congo, Kenya, Malawi and Zimbabwe.
