= Elachista chelonitis =

Scientific classification
- Kingdom: Animalia
- Phylum: Arthropoda
- Class: Insecta
- Order: Lepidoptera
- Family: Elachistidae
- Genus: Elachista
- Species: E. chelonitis

Binomial name
- Elachista chelonitis Meyrick, 1909

Synonyms
- Cleroptila chelonitis

Species of moth

Elachista chelonitis is a moth of the family Elachistidae. It is found in South Africa, Kenya and Malawi.
