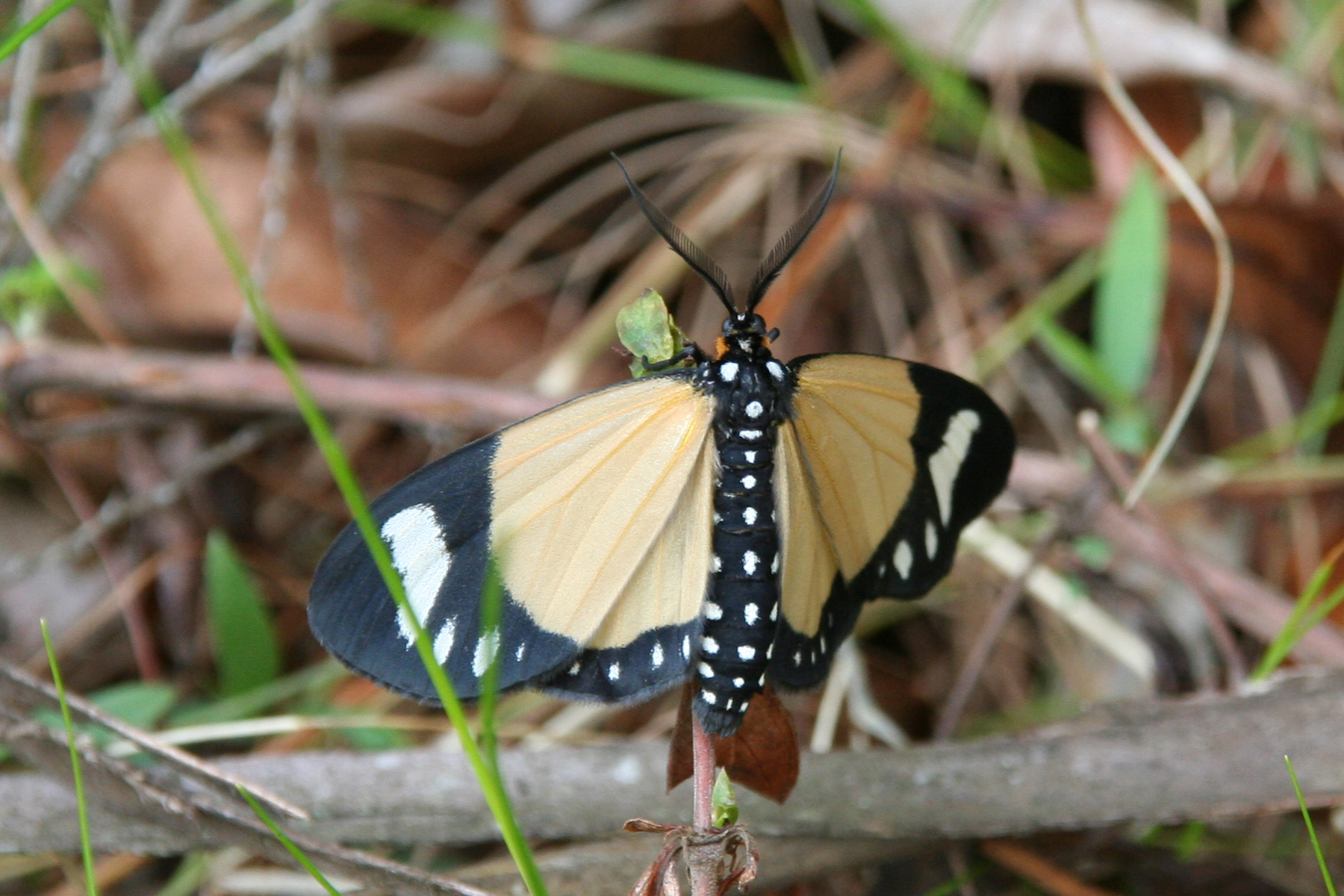

Scientific classification
- Domain: Eukaryota
- Kingdom: Animalia
- Phylum: Arthropoda
- Class: Insecta
- Order: Lepidoptera
- Family: Geometridae
- Genus: Scopula
- Species: S. libyssa

Binomial name
- Scopula libyssa (Hopffer, 1857)

Synonyms
- Aletis libyssa Hopffer, 1857; Cartaletis libyssa; Aletis ethelinda Kirby, 1896; Aletis helcita latifasciata Gaede, 1917; Cartaletis monteironis nigriventris Gaede, 1917; Cartaletis monteironis entebbena Strand, 1921; Aletis monteironis Druce, 1883; Cartaletis libyssa fusciventris Gaede, 1917

= Scopula libyssa =

Species of geometer moth in subfamily Sterrhinae

Scopula libyssa is a moth of the family Geometridae. It is found in Africa.

The larvae feed on Oxyanthus monteiroi, Oxyanthus speciosus and Randia axillare.

== Subspecies ==
- Scopula libyssa libyssa (Mozambique, South Africa, Uganda)
- Scopula libyssa ethelinda (Kirby, 1896) (Kenya, Malawi, Tanzania)
- Scopula libyssa monteironis (Druce, 1883)
- Scopula libyssa natalensis (Prout, 1917) (South Africa)
