= Thyranthrene albicincta =

Scientific classification
- Kingdom: Animalia
- Phylum: Arthropoda
- Class: Insecta
- Order: Lepidoptera
- Family: Sesiidae
- Genus: Thyranthrene
- Species: T. albicincta

Binomial name
- Thyranthrene albicincta (Hampson, 1919)

Synonyms
- Homogyna albicincta Hampson, 1919

Species of moth

Thyranthrene albicincta is a moth of the family Sesiidae. It is known from Malawi.
