= Scopula erinaria =

Scientific classification
- Domain: Eukaryota
- Kingdom: Animalia
- Phylum: Arthropoda
- Class: Insecta
- Order: Lepidoptera
- Family: Geometridae
- Genus: Scopula
- Species: S. erinaria

Binomial name
- Scopula erinaria (C. Swinhoe, 1904)

Synonyms
- Lycauges erinaria C. Swinhoe, 1904; Scopula isolatata Vári & Kroon, 1986

Species of geometer moth in subfamily Sterrhinae

Scopula erinaria is a moth of the family Geometridae. It was described by Charles Swinhoe in 1904. It is found in Ethiopia, Kenya, Malawi, South Africa, Tanzania and Zimbabwe.

== Subspecies ==
- Scopula erinaria erinaria (Kenya, Malawi, Tanzania)
- Scopula erinaria isolata L. B. Prout, 1920 (South Africa)
