= Hibrildes norax =

Scientific classification
- Kingdom: Animalia
- Phylum: Arthropoda
- Class: Insecta
- Order: Lepidoptera
- Family: Eupterotidae
- Genus: Hibrildes
- Species: H. norax

Binomial name
- Hibrildes norax Druce, 1888

Synonyms
- Hibrildes carpenteri Poulton, 1929; Hibrildes sheffieldi Poulton, 1929; Anengya spiritalis Karsch, 1895

Species of moth

Hibrildes norax is a moth in the family Eupterotidae. It was described by Druce in 1888. It is found in the Democratic Republic of Congo (Katanga), Guinea, Malawi, Zambia and Zimbabwe.

Adults are semihyaline, the fore- and hindwings uniformly covered with yellowish-white scales, with all the veins light brown.
