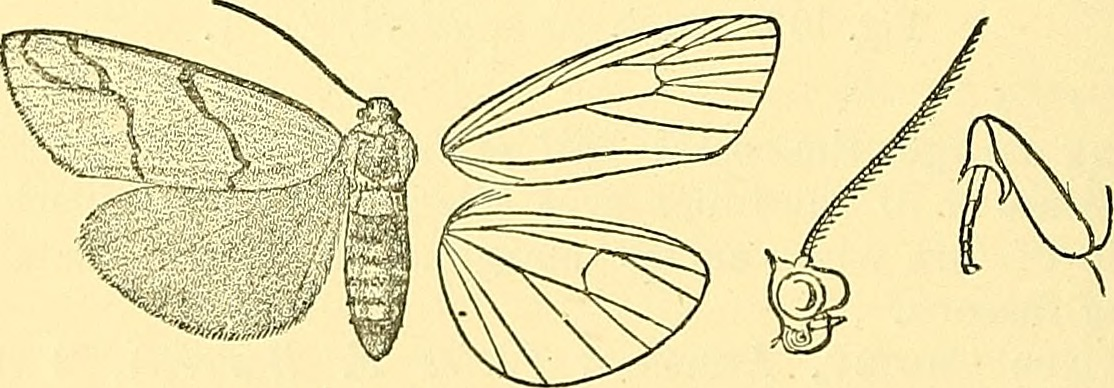
- Illustration of Carcinopodia furcifasciata

Scientific classification
- Domain: Eukaryota
- Kingdom: Animalia
- Phylum: Arthropoda
- Class: Insecta
- Order: Lepidoptera
- Superfamily: Noctuoidea
- Family: Erebidae
- Subfamily: Arctiinae
- Genus: Carcinopodia
- Species: C. furcifasciata

Binomial name
- Carcinopodia furcifasciata (Butler, 1895)

Synonyms
- Gnophria fursifasciata Butler, 1895

= Carcinopodia furcifasciata =

Species of moth

Carcinopodia furcifasciata is a moth of the subfamily Arctiinae. It is found in Malawi.
