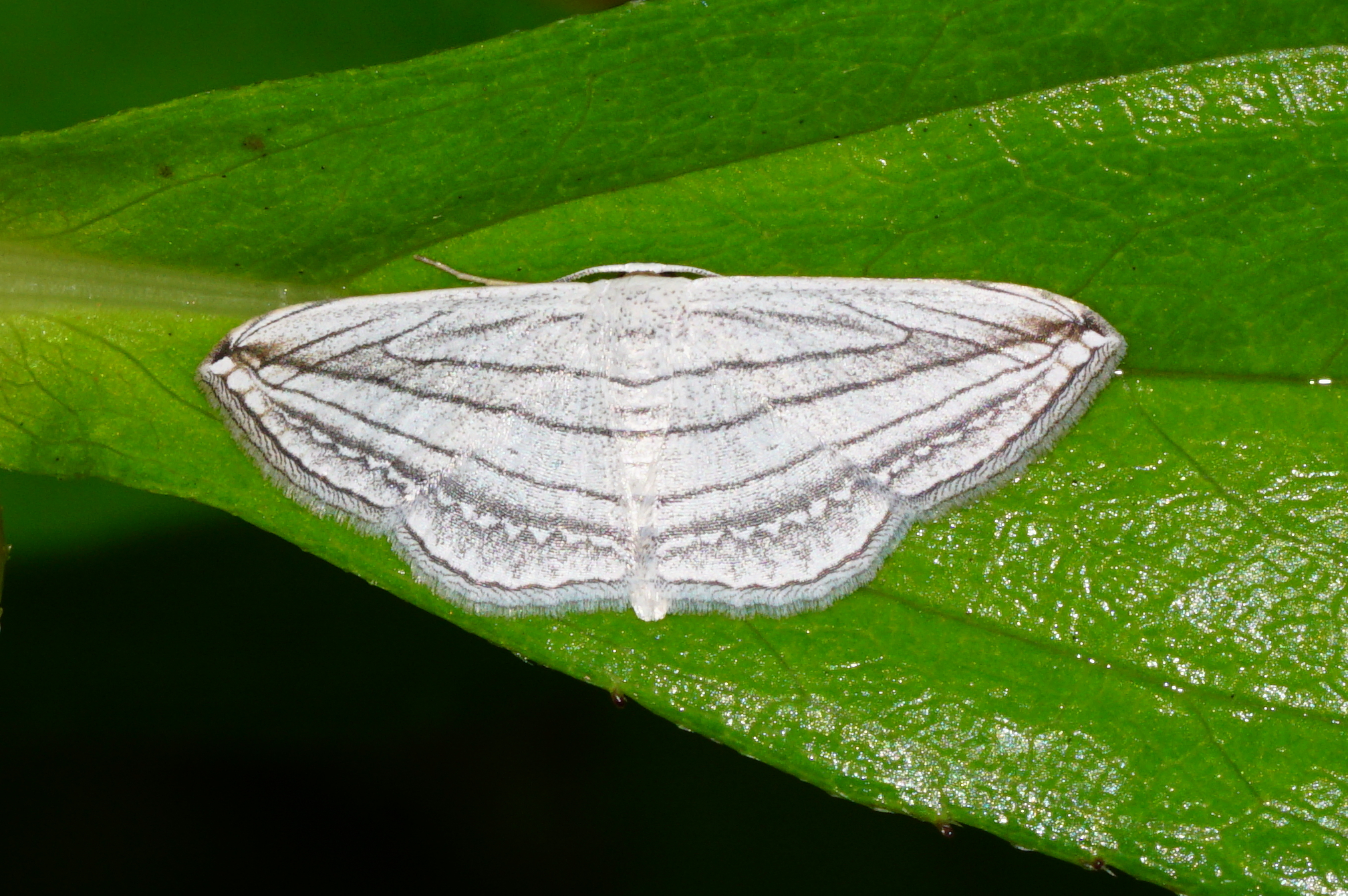

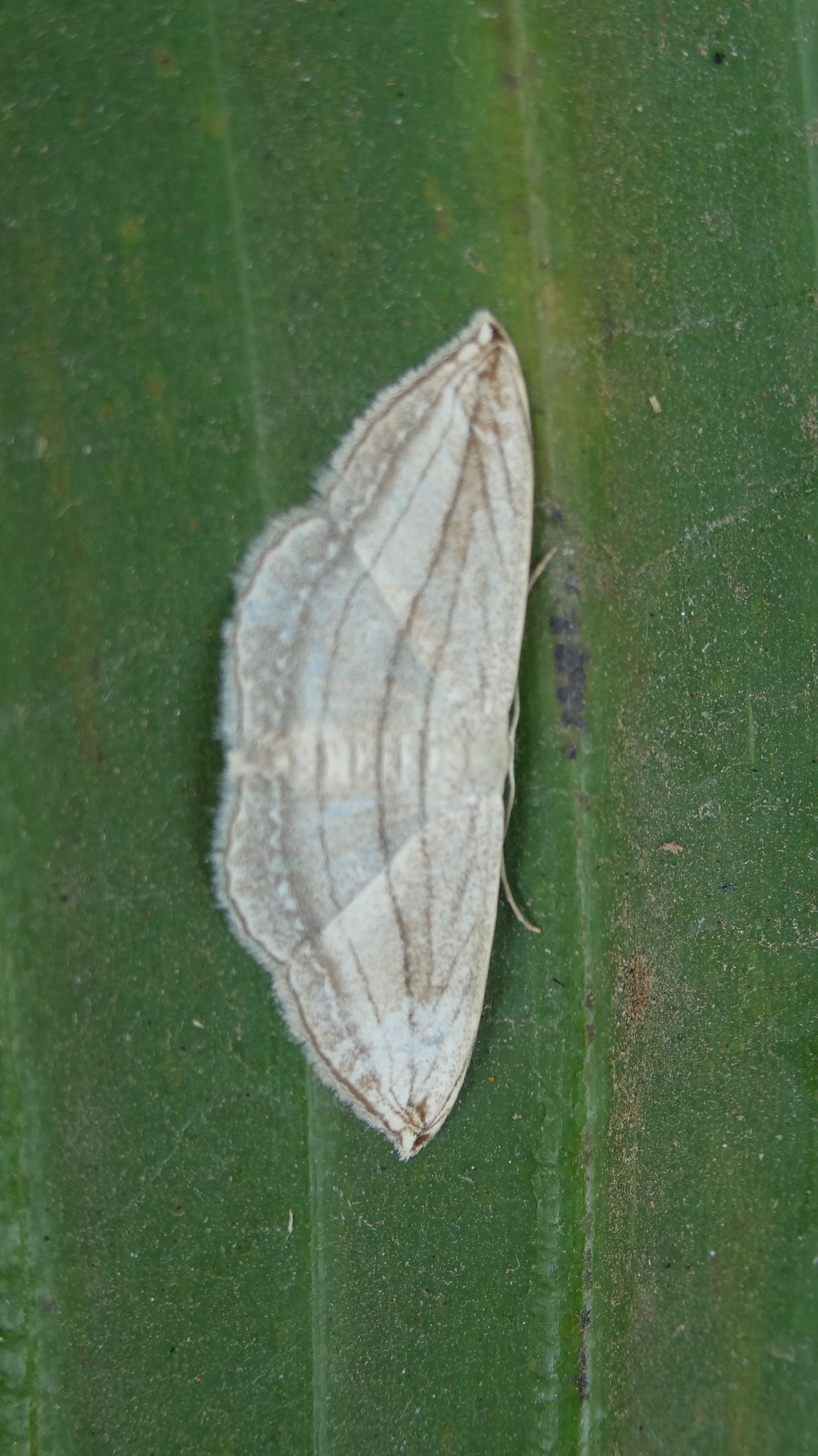

Scientific classification
- Domain: Eukaryota
- Kingdom: Animalia
- Phylum: Arthropoda
- Class: Insecta
- Order: Lepidoptera
- Family: Geometridae
- Genus: Scopula
- Species: S. opicata

Binomial name
- Scopula opicata (Fabricius, 1798)

Synonyms
- Phalaena opicata Fabricius, 1798; Pigia infantularia Guenée, 1857; Micronia vanaria Walker, 1861

= Scopula opicata =

Species of geometer moth in subfamily Sterrhinae

Scopula opicata is a moth of the family Geometridae first described by Johan Christian Fabricius in 1798. It is found in tropical Africa, including Malawi and Zambia, as well as in Sri Lanka, India, China (Hainan), Myanmar, Sundaland, the Philippines, Sulawesi, Timor and New Guinea.

== Description ==
Its wingspan is 20 millimetres (0.79 in). The species is white slightly sprinkled with brown. Frons blackish. Abdomen with brown rings. Forewings with prominent oblique brown line from lower angle of cell to inner margin near base. Another line runs from apex to middle of inner margin. Three submarginal lines diverging from the apex, of which the outer two are slightly waved. A marginal line present. Hindwings with sub-basal, antemedial, and medial prominent lines. Two waved postmedial lines and a marginal line present.
