= Karschiola =

Scientific classification
- Kingdom: Animalia
- Phylum: Arthropoda
- Class: Insecta
- Order: Lepidoptera
- Superfamily: Noctuoidea
- Family: Erebidae
- Subfamily: Arctiinae
- Genus: Karschiola; Gaede, 1926
- Species: K. holoclera

Binomial name
- Karschiola holoclera (Karsch, 1894)

Synonyms
- Caryatis holoclera Karsch, 1894

Genus of moths

Karschiola is a genus of tiger moths in the family Erebidae. It contains the single species, Karschiola holoclera, which is found in Malawi, Tanzania and Zimbabwe.
