= Eilema nebuliferella =

Scientific classification
- Domain: Eukaryota
- Kingdom: Animalia
- Phylum: Arthropoda
- Class: Insecta
- Order: Lepidoptera
- Superfamily: Noctuoidea
- Family: Erebidae
- Subfamily: Arctiinae
- Genus: Eilema
- Species: E. nebuliferella

Binomial name
- Eilema nebuliferella Strand, 1922

Synonyms
- Eilema albuliferella Strand, 1922; Brunia nebuliferella (Strand, 1922)

Species of moth

Eilema nebuliferella is a moth of the subfamily Arctiinae. It was described by Embrik Strand in 1922. It is found in Malawi.
