= Cyana rejecta =

Scientific classification
- Kingdom: Animalia
- Phylum: Arthropoda
- Class: Insecta
- Order: Lepidoptera
- Superfamily: Noctuoidea
- Family: Erebidae
- Subfamily: Arctiinae
- Genus: Cyana
- Species: C. rejecta

Binomial name
- Cyana rejecta (Walker, 1854)

Synonyms
- Setina rejecta Walker, 1854; Lithosia bipunctigera Wallengren, 1860

Species of moth

Cyana rejecta is a moth of the family Erebidae. It was described by Francis Walker in 1854. It is found in the Democratic Republic of the Congo, Ethiopia, Kenya, Malawi, Sierra Leone, South Africa, Tanzania, Gambia and Uganda.
