= Monopetalotaxis chalciphora =

Scientific classification
- Kingdom: Animalia
- Phylum: Arthropoda
- Class: Insecta
- Order: Lepidoptera
- Family: Sesiidae
- Genus: Monopetalotaxis
- Species: M. chalciphora

Binomial name
- Monopetalotaxis chalciphora Hampson, 1919

Species of moth

Monopetalotaxis chalciphora is a moth of the family Sesiidae. It is known from Malawi.
