= Pyranthrene =

Scientific classification
- Kingdom: Animalia
- Phylum: Arthropoda
- Class: Insecta
- Order: Lepidoptera
- Family: Sesiidae
- Tribe: Osminiini
- Genus: Pyranthrene; Hampson, 1919
- Species: P. flammans

Binomial name
- Pyranthrene flammans Hampson, 1919

Genus of moths

Pyranthrene is a genus of moths in the family Sesiidae containing only one species, Pyranthrene flammans, which is known from Malawi.
