= Leoniloma =

Scientific classification
- Kingdom: Animalia
- Phylum: Arthropoda
- Class: Insecta
- Order: Lepidoptera
- Superfamily: Noctuoidea
- Family: Erebidae
- Subfamily: Calpinae
- Genus: Leoniloma; Hampson, 1926
- Species: L. convergens

Binomial name
- Leoniloma convergens Hampson, 1926

Genus of moths

Leoniloma is a monotypic moth genus of the family Erebidae. Its only species, Leoniloma convergens, is found in the Democratic Republic of the Congo, the Gambia, Ghana, Malawi, Mauritania, Mozambique, Sierra Leone, South Africa, Zaire and Zimbabwe. Both the genus and the species were first described by George Hampson in 1926.
