= Hellinsia madecasseus =

Scientific classification
- Kingdom: Animalia
- Phylum: Arthropoda
- Clade: Pancrustacea
- Class: Insecta
- Order: Lepidoptera
- Family: Pterophoridae
- Genus: Hellinsia
- Species: H. madecasseus

Binomial name
- Hellinsia madecasseus (Bigot, 1964)

Synonyms
- Pterophorus madecasseus Bigot, 1964; Paulianilus madecasseus; Paulianilus devius (Bigot, 1964); Paulianilus lolibai Arenberger, 2011

Species of plume moth

Hellinsia madecasseus is a moth of the family Pterophoridae.

== Distribution ==
It is known from the Democratic Republic of Congo, Kenya, Madagascar, Tanzania, Réunion, South Africa, Uganda and Malawi.

== Hostplant ==
The larvae of this species feeds on Tithonia diversifolia and Acanthospermum hispidum (Asteraceae).
