= Donacoscaptes flavilinealis =

Scientific classification
- Kingdom: Animalia
- Phylum: Arthropoda
- Clade: Pancrustacea
- Class: Insecta
- Order: Lepidoptera
- Family: Crambidae
- Subfamily: Crambinae
- Tribe: Haimbachiini
- Genus: Donacoscaptes
- Species: D. flavilinealis

Binomial name
- Donacoscaptes flavilinealis (Hampson, 1919)

Synonyms
- Diatraea flavilinealis Hampson, 1919

Species of moth

Donacoscaptes flavilinealis is a moth in the family Crambidae. It was described by George Hampson in 1919. It is found in Malawi.
