= List of moths of Tanzania =

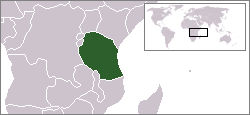
Location of Tanzania

There are about 1,700 known moth species of Tanzania. The moths (mostly nocturnal) and butterflies (mostly diurnal) together make up the taxonomic order Lepidoptera.

This is a list of moth species which have been recorded from Tanzania.

== Alucitidae ==
- Alucita dohertyi (Walsingham, 1909)
- Alucita ectomesa (Hering, 1917)
- Alucita entoprocta (Hering, 1917)
- Alucita hemicyclus (Hering, 1917)
- Alucita isodina (Meyrick, 1920)

== Anomoeotidae ==
- Staphylinochrous meinickei Hering, 1928
- Thermochrous neurophaea Hering, 1928

== Arctiinae ==
- Acantharctia aurivillii Bartel, 1903
- Acantharctia nigrivena Rothschild, 1935
- Acantharctia tenuifasciata Hampson, 1910
- Acanthofrontia biannulata (Wichgraf, 1922)
- Afrasura amaniensis (Cieslak & Häuser, 2006)
- Afrasura neavi (Hampson, 1914)
- Afrospilarctia flavida (Bartel, 1903)
- Afrospilarctia lucida (Druce, 1898)
- Alpenus investigatorum (Karsch, 1898)
- Alpenus maculosa (Stoll, 1781)
- Alpenus pardalina (Rothschild, 1910)
- Alpenus schraderi (Rothschild, 1910)
- Amata alicia (Butler, 1876)
- Amata burtti (Distant, 1900)
- Amata cerbera (Linnaeus, 1764)
- Amata ceres (Oberthür, 1878)
- Amata chloroscia (Hampson, 1901)
- Amata chrysozona (Hampson, 1898)
- Amata consimilis (Hampson, 1901)
- Amata dilateralis (Hampson, 1898)
- Amata discata (Druce, 1898)
- Amata janenschi Seitz, 1926
- Amata kuhlweini (Lefèbvre, 1832)
- Amata miozona (Hampson, 1910)
- Amata monticola (Aurivillius, 1910)
- Amata nigricilia (Strand, 1912)
- Amata phaeozona (Zerny, 1912)
- Amata phoenicia (Hampson, 1898)
- Amata rubritincta (Hampson, 1903)
- Amerila affinis (Rothschild, 1910)
- Amerila bipartita (Rothschild, 1910)
- Amerila bubo (Walker, 1855)
- Amerila carneola (Hampson, 1916)
- Amerila fennia (Druce, 1887)
- Amerila howardi (Pinhey, 1955)
- Amerila lupia (Druce, 1887)
- Amerila niveivitrea (Bartel, 1903)
- Amerila phaedra Weymer, 1892
- Amerila puella (Fabricius, 1793)
- Amerila roseomarginata (Rothschild, 1910)
- Amerila thermochroa (Hampson, 1916)
- Amerila vidua (Cramer, 1780)
- Amphicallia bellatrix (Dalman, 1823)
- Amphicallia pactolicus (Butler, 1888)
- Amphicallia quagga Strand, 1909
- Amphicallia solai (Druce, 1907)
- Amphicallia thelwalli (Druce, 1882)
- Anaphosia astrigata Hampson, 1910
- Apisa canescens Walker, 1855
- Argina amanda (Boisduval, 1847)
- Argina astrea (Drury, 1773)
- Argina leonina (Walker, 1865)
- Asura doa Kühne, 2007
- Asura mutabilis Kühne, 2007
- Asura sagenaria (Wallengren, 1860)
- Balacra flavimacula Walker, 1856
- Balacra nigripennis (Aurivillius, 1904)
- Balacra preussi (Aurivillius, 1904)
- Binna penicillata Walker, 1865
- Caripodia chrysargyria Hampson, 1900
- Ceryx hilda (Ehrmann, 1894)
- Cragia distigmata (Hampson, 1901)
- Creatonotos leucanioides Holland, 1893
- Creatonotos punctivitta (Walker, 1854)
- Cyana arenbergeri Karisch, 2003
- Cyana nemasisha Roesler, 1990
- Cyana pretoriae (Distant, 1897)
- Cyana rejecta (Walker, 1854)
- Dasyarctia grisea Gaede, 1923
- Eilema albescens (Aurivillius, 1910)
- Eilema bipartita Aurivillius, 1910
- Eilema costimacula Aurivillius, 1910
- Eilema marwitziana Strand, 1912
- Eilema mesosticta Hampson, 1911
- Eilema oblitterans (Felder, 1868)
- Eilema peperita (Hampson, 1901)
- Eilema polioplaga (Hampson, 1901)
- Eilema pusilana Strand, 1912
- Eilema stevensii (Holland, 1892)
- Epilacydes scita (Walker, 1865)
- Epitoxis duplicata Gaede, 1926
- Estigmene ansorgei Rothschild, 1910
- Estigmene ochreomarginata Bethune-Baker, 1909
- Estigmene trivitta (Walker, 1855)
- Euchromia amoena (Möschler, 1872)
- Euchromia folletii (Guérin-Méneville, 1832)
- Eyralpenus atricrures (Hampson, 1916)
- Eyralpenus diplosticta (Hampson, 1900)
- Eyralpenus inconspicua (Rothschild, 1910)
- Eyralpenus meinhofi (Bartel, 1903)
- Eyralpenus scioana (Oberthür, 1880)
- Eyralpenus sublutea (Bartel, 1903)
- Eyralpenus trifasciata (Holland, 1892)
- Galtara doriae (Oberthür, 1880)
- Hypersypnoides heinrichi Laporte, 1979
- Ilemodes isogyna Romieux, 1935
- Ischnarctia brunnescens Bartel, 1903
- Ischnarctia cinerea (Pagenstecher, 1903)
- Karschiola holoclera (Karsch, 1894)
- Lamprosiella eborella (Boisduval, 1847)
- Lepidilema unipectinata Aurivillius, 1910
- Lepista pandula (Boisduval, 1847)
- Lobilema conspersa Aurivillius, 1910
- Macrosia fumeola (Walker, 1854)
- Megalonycta forsteri Laporte, 1979
- Metarctia atrivenata Kiriakoff, 1956
- Metarctia collocalia Kiriakoff, 1957
- Metarctia epimela (Kiriakoff, 1979)
- Metarctia fulvia Hampson, 1901
- Metarctia inconspicua Holland, 1892
- Metarctia insignis Kiriakoff, 1959
- Metarctia lateritia Herrich-Schäffer, 1855
- Metarctia lindemannae Kiriakoff, 1961
- Metarctia pavlitzkae (Kiriakoff, 1961)
- Metarctia rubripuncta Hampson, 1898
- Metarctia rufescens Walker, 1855
- Metarctia seydeliana (Kiriakoff, 1953)
- Micralarctia punctulatum (Wallengren, 1860)
- Micralarctia semipura (Bartel, 1903)
- Neuroxena ansorgei Kirby, 1896
- Nyctemera apicalis (Walker, 1854)
- Nyctemera insulare (Boisduval, 1833)
- Nyctemera itokina (Aurivillius, 1904)
- Nyctemera leuconoe Hopffer, 1857
- Nyctemera rattrayi (Swinhoe, 1904)
- Nyctemera restrictum (Butler, 1894)
- Nyctemera transitella (Strand, 1909)
- Nyctemera usambarae Oberthür, 1893
- Ochrota asuraeformis (Strand, 1912)
- Owambarctia unipuncta Kiriakoff, 1973
- Paralacydes arborifera (Butler, 1875)
- Paralacydes bivittata (Bartel, 1903)
- Paralacydes decemmaculata (Rothschild, 1916)
- Paralacydes fiorii (Berio, 1937)
- Paralacydes ramosa (Hampson, 1907)
- Paralacydes vocula (Stoll, 1790)
- Paralpenus wintgensi (Strand, 1909)
- Popoudina brosi Toulgoët, 1986
- Pseudonaclia bifasciata Aurivillius, 1910
- Pseudonaclia fasciata Gaede, 1926
- Pseudothyretes perpusilla (Walker, 1856)
- Pusiola elongata (Aurivillius, 1910)
- Radiarctia jacksoni (Rothschild, 1910)
- Radiarctia rhodesiana (Hampson, 1900)
- Rhabdomarctia rubrilineata (Bethune-Baker, 1911)
- Secusio sansibarensis Strand, 1909
- Secusio strigata Walker, 1854
- Seydelia ellioti (Butler, 1895)
- Spilosoma affinis Bartel, 1903
- Spilosoma albiventre Kiriakoff, 1963
- Spilosoma atrivenata Rothschild, 1933
- Spilosoma baxteri (Rothschild, 1910)
- Spilosoma bipartita Rothschild, 1933
- Spilosoma curvilinea Walker, 1855
- Spilosoma lineata Walker, 1855
- Spilosoma pales (Druce, 1910)
- Spilosoma semihyalina Bartel, 1903
- Spilosoma sublutescens Kiriakoff, 1958
- Spilosoma unipuncta (Hampson, 1905)
- Teracotona approximans (Rothschild, 1917)
- Teracotona clara Holland, 1892
- Teracotona euprepia Hampson, 1900
- Teracotona homeyeri Rothschild, 1910
- Teracotona latifasciata Carcasson, 1965
- Teracotona melanocera (Hampson, 1920)
- Teracotona pardalina Bartel, 1903
- Teracotona rhodophaea (Walker, 1865)
- Teracotona subapproximans Rothschild, 1933
- Teracotona subterminata Hampson, 1901
- Teracotona translucens (Grünberg, 1907)
- Teracotona uhrikmeszarosi Svent-Ivany, 1942
- Thumatha africana Kühne, 2007
- Thyretes trichaetiformis Zerny, 1912
- Utetheisa elata (Fabricius, 1798)
- Utetheisa pulchella (Linnaeus, 1758)

== Autostichidae ==
- Turatia argillacea Gozmány, 2000

== Brachodidae ==
- Phycodes substriata Walsingham, 1891

== Brahmaeidae ==
- Dactyloceras catenigera (Karsch, 1895)
- Dactyloceras maculata (Conte, 1911)
- Dactyloceras neumayeri (Pagenstecher, 1885)
- Dactyloceras vingerhoedti Bouyer, 2005
- Dactyloceras widenmanni (Karsch, 1895)

== Choreutidae ==
- Anthophila flavimaculata (Walsingham, 1891)

== Cosmopterigidae ==
- Cosmopterix athesiae Huemer & Koster, 2006

== Cossidae ==
- Arctiocossus punctifera Gaede, 1929
- Coryphodema ochracea Gaede, 1929
- Eulophonotus elegans (Aurivillius, 1910)
- Meharia semilactea (Warren & Rothschild, 1905)
- Meharia tanganyikae Bradley, 1951
- Nomima szunyoghyi (Gozmány, 1965)
- Oreocossus kilimanjarensis (Holland, 1892)
- Phragmataecia brunni Pagenstecher, 1892

== Crambidae ==
- Adelpherupa flavescens Hampson, 1919
- Anania metaleuca (Hampson, 1913)
- Ancylolomia melanella Hampson, 1919
- Ancylolomia melanothoracia Hampson, 1919
- Conotalis nigroradians (Mabille, 1900)
- Cotachena smaragdina (Butler, 1875)
- Crocidolomia pavonana (Fabricius, 1794)
- Culladia achroellum (Mabille, 1900)
- Euclasta varii Popescu-Gorj & Constantinescu, 1973
- Glyphodes basifascialis Hampson, 1898
- Heliothela ophideresana (Walker, 1863)
- Nomophila brevispinalis Munroe, 1973
- Nomophila noctuella ([Denis & Schiffermüller], 1775)
- Parerupa africana (Aurivillius, 1910)
- Patissa geminalis Hampson, 1919
- Powysia rosealinea Maes, 2006
- Prionapteryx alternalis Maes, 2002
- Prionapteryx phaeomesa (Hampson, 1919)
- Protinopalpa subclathrata Strand, 1911
- Psammotis haematidea (Hampson, 1913)
- Pyrausta centralis Maes, 2009
- Pyrausta microdontaloides Maes, 2009
- Pyrausta perparvula Maes, 2009
- Pyrausta sanguifusalis Hampson, 1913

== Drepanidae ==
- Aethiopsestis mufindiae Watson, 1965
- Gonoreta subtilis (Bryk, 1913)
- Negera natalensis (Felder, 1874)

== Elachistidae ==
- Ethmia ballistis Meyrick, 1908
- Ethmia taxiacta Meyrick, 1920

== Epipyropidae ==
- Epipyrops cerolestes Tams, 1947
- Epipyrops epityraea Scheven, 1974

== Eriocottidae ==
- Compsoctena africanella (Strand, 1909)

== Eupterotidae ==
- Camerunia albida Aurivillius, 1901
- Hibrildes crawshayi Butler, 1896
- Hoplojana distincta Rothschild, 1917
- Hoplojana indecisa (Aurivillius, 1901)
- Hoplojana rhodoptera (Gerstaecker, 1871)
- Jana eurymas Herrich-Schäffer, 1854
- Janomima mariana (White, 1843)
- Phiala alba Aurivillius, 1893
- Phiala costipuncta (Herrich-Schäffer, 1855)
- Phiala infuscata (Grünberg, 1907)
- Stenoglene obtusus (Walker, 1864)
- Stenoglene pira Druce, 1896

== Gelechiidae ==
- Anarsia agricola Walsingham, 1891
- Brachmia septella (Zeller, 1852)
- Dichomeris rhodophaea Meyrick, 1920
- Pectinophora gossypiella (Saunders, 1844)
- Ptilothyris crossoceros Meyrick, 1934
- Trichotaphe chalybitis (Meyrick, 1920)

== Geometridae ==
- Acanthovalva bilineata (Warren, 1895)
- Acidaliastis systema D. S. Fletcher, 1978
- Adesmobathra ozoloides Prout, 1916
- Allochrostes impunctata (Warren, 1897)
- Antharmostes papilio Prout, 1912
- Aphilopota exterritorialis (Strand, 1909)
- Aphilopota foedata (Bastelberger, 1907)
- Aphilopota semiusta (Distant, 1898)
- Aphilopota triphasia Prout, 1954
- Aphilopota viriditincta (Warren, 1905)
- Archichlora rectilineata Carcasson, 1971
- Ascotis reciprocaria (Walker, 1860)
- Asthenotricha anisobapta Prout, 1932
- Asthenotricha ansorgei Warren, 1899
- Asthenotricha dentatissima Warren, 1899
- Asthenotricha inutilis Warren, 1901
- Asthenotricha pycnoconia Janse, 1933
- Asthenotricha serraticornis Warren, 1902
- Asthenotricha straba Prout, 1921
- Biston abruptaria (Walker, 1869)
- Biston homoclera (Prout, 1938)
- Brachytrita cervinaria Swinhoe, 1904
- Cacochloris ochrea (Warren, 1897)
- Cartaletis libyssa (Hopffer, 1857)
- Casilda lucidaria (Swinhoe, 1904)
- Celidomphax analiplaga (Warren, 1905)
- Chiasmia affinis (Warren, 1902)
- Chiasmia assimilis (Warren, 1899)
- Chiasmia butaria (Swinhoe, 1904)
- Chiasmia costiguttata (Warren, 1899)
- Chiasmia geminilinea (Prout, 1932)
- Chiasmia inconspicua (Warren, 1897)
- Chiasmia kilimanjarensis (Holland, 1892)
- Chiasmia maculosa (Warren, 1899)
- Chiasmia normata (Walker, 1861)
- Chiasmia rectilinea (Warren, 1905)
- Chiasmia rectistriaria (Herrich-Schäffer, 1854)
- Chiasmia simplicilinea (Warren, 1905)
- Chiasmia sororcula (Warren, 1897)
- Chiasmia streniata (Guenée, 1858)
- Chiasmia subcurvaria (Mabille, 1897)
- Chiasmia umbrata (Warren, 1897)
- Chiasmia umbratilis (Butler, 1875)
- Chlorerythra rubriplaga Warren, 1895
- Chlorissa albistrigulata (Warren, 1897)
- Chlorissa attenuata (Walker, 1862)
- Chloroclystis consocer Prout, 1937
- Chloroclystis cryptolopha Prout, 1932
- Chloroctenis conspersa Warren, 1909
- Cleora munda (Warren, 1899)
- Cleora rostella D. S. Fletcher, 1967
- Cleora thyris D. S. Fletcher, 1967
- Coenina aurivena Butler, 1898
- Collix foraminata Guenée, 1858
- Comostolopsis simplex Warren, 1902
- Comostolopsis stillata (Felder & Rogenhofer, 1875)
- Conolophia conscitaria (Walker, 1861)
- Cyclophora paratropa (Prout, 1920)
- Cyclophora unocula (Warren, 1897)
- Derambila niphosphaeras (Prout, 1934)
- Disclisioprocta natalata (Walker, 1862)
- Dithecodes ornithospila (Prout, 1911)
- Drepanogynis johnstonei (Prout, 1938)
- Drepanogynis lacuum (Prout, 1938)
- Ecpetala obtusa (Warren, 1902)
- Ectropis anisa Prout, 1915
- Ectropis delosaria (Walker, 1862)
- Ectropis gozmanyi D. S. Fletcher, 1978
- Ectropis ikonda Herbulot, 1981
- Ectropis ocellata Warren, 1902
- Epigynopteryx africana (Aurivillius, 1910)
- Epigynopteryx maeviaria (Guenée, 1858)
- Epirrhoe annulifera (Warren, 1902)
- Erastria albosignata (Walker, 1863)
- Erastria leucicolor (Butler, 1875)
- Erastria madecassaria (Boisduval, 1833)
- Ereunetea reussi Gaede, 1914
- Eucrostes disparata Walker, 1861
- Euexia percnopus Prout, 1915
- Eupithecia celatisigna (Warren, 1902)
- Eupithecia devestita (Warren, 1899)
- Eupithecia dilucida (Warren, 1899)
- Eupithecia proflua Prout, 1932
- Eupithecia regulosa (Warren, 1902)
- Eupithecia rigida Swinhoe, 1892
- Eupithecia salti D. S. Fletcher, 1951
- Eupithecia semipallida Janse, 1933
- Eupithecia tricuspis Prout, 1932
- Eupithecia undiculata Prout, 1932
- Haplolabida monticolata (Aurivillius, 1910)
- Haplolabida sjostedti (Aurivillius, 1910)
- Heterorachis dichorda Prout, 1915
- Hierochthonia migrata Prout, 1930
- Hydrelia ericinella Aurivillius 1910
- Hydrelia costalis Aurivillius, 1910
- Hypsometra ericinellae Aurivillius, 1910
- Idaea auriflua (Warren, 1902)
- Idaea heres (Prout, 1932)
- Idaea macrostyla (Warren, 1900)
- Idaea umbricosta (Prout, 1913)
- Idiochlora subrufibasis (Prout, 1930)
- Idiodes flexilinea (Warren, 1898)
- Isturgia catalaunaria (Guenée, 1858)
- Isturgia deerraria (Walker, 1861)
- Isturgia triseriata (Prout, 1926)
- Lophorrhachia burdoni Townsend, 1958
- Microligia dolosa Warren, 1897
- Mimoclystia cancellata (Warren, 1899)
- Mimoclystia corticearia (Aurivillius, 1910)
- Mixocera albistrigata (Pagenstecher, 1893)
- Neurotoca notata Warren, 1897
- Oaracta maculata (Warren, 1897)
- Obolcola petronaria (Guenée, 1858)
- Odontopera azelinaria (Swinhoe, 1904)
- Omizodes rubrifasciata (Butler, 1896)
- Omphalucha brunnea (Warren, 1899)
- Omphax plantaria Guenée, 1858
- Oreometra vittata Aurivillius, 1910
- Orthonama obstipata (Fabricius, 1794)
- Pachypalpella subalbata (Warren, 1900)
- Paraptychodes kedar (Druce, 1896)
- Paraptychodes tenuis (Butler, 1878)
- Petovia marginata Walker, 1854
- Piercia fumitacta (Warren, 1903)
- Piercia prasinaria (Warren, 1901)
- Piercia subrufaria (Warren, 1903)
- Piercia subterlimbata (Prout, 1917)
- Pingasa distensaria (Walker, 1860)
- Pitthea trifasciata Dewitz, 1881
- Prasinocyma loveridgei Prout, 1926
- Prasinocyma permitis Prout, 1932
- Problepsis digammata Kirby, 1896
- Protosteira spectabilis (Warren, 1899)
- Pseudolarentia monosticta (Butler, 1894)
- Pseudosoloe thalassina (Warren, 1909)
- Racotis apodosima Prout, 1931
- Racotis squalida (Butler, 1878)
- Racotis zebrina Warren, 1899
- Rheumaptera relicta (Herbulot, 1953)
- Rhodesia alboviridata (Saalmüller, 1880)
- Rhodometra sacraria (Linnaeus, 1767)
- Rhodophthitus anamesa (Prout, 1915)
- Rhodophthitus commaculata (Warren, 1897)
- Rhodophthitus rudicornis (Butler, 1898)
- Rhodophthitus tricoloraria (Mabille, 1890)
- Scardamia maculata Warren, 1897
- Scopula agrapta (Warren, 1902)
- Scopula argentidisca (Warren, 1902)
- Scopula curvimargo (Warren, 1900)
- Scopula erinaria (Swinhoe, 1904)
- Scopula internata (Guenée, 1857)
- Scopula lactaria (Walker, 1861)
- Scopula latitans Prout, 1920
- Scopula minorata (Boisduval, 1833)
- Scopula natalica (Butler, 1875)
- Scopula rufinubes (Warren, 1900)
- Scopula sagittilinea (Warren, 1897)
- Scopula serena Prout, 1920
- Scopula umbratilinea (Warren, 1901)
- Scotopteryx nictitaria (Herrich-Schäffer, 1855)
- Somatina virginalis Prout, 1917
- Thalassodes quadraria Guenée, 1857
- Traminda acuta (Warren, 1897)
- Traminda neptunaria (Guenée, 1858)
- Traminda vividaria (Walker, 1861)
- Trimetopia aetheraria Guenée, 1858
- Triphosa tritocelidata Aurivillius, 1910
- Victoria triplaga Prout, 1915
- Xanthisthisa tarsispina (Warren, 1901)
- Xanthorhoe albodivisaria (Aurivillius 1910)
- Xanthorhoe alluaudi (Prout, 1932)
- Xanthorhoe argenteolineata (Aurivillius, 1910)
- Xanthorhoe belgarum Herbulot, 1981
- Xanthorhoe exorista Prout, 1922
- Xanthorhoe heteromorpha (Hampson, 1909)
- Xanthorhoe procne (Fawcett, 1916)
- Xanthorhoe transcissa (Warren, 1902)
- Xanthorhoe transjugata Prout, 1923
- Xanthorhoe trientata (Warren, 1901)
- Xanthorhoe tuta Herbulot, 1981
- Xenochroma candidata Warren, 1902
- Zamarada acalantis Herbulot, 2001
- Zamarada acosmeta Prout, 1921
- Zamarada acrochra Prout, 1928
- Zamarada aequilumata D. S. Fletcher, 1974
- Zamarada amelga D. S. Fletcher, 1974
- Zamarada amicta Prout, 1915
- Zamarada ansorgei Warren, 1897
- Zamarada arguta D. S. Fletcher, 1974
- Zamarada bastelbergeri Gaede, 1915
- Zamarada bathyscaphes Prout, 1912
- Zamarada calypso Prout, 1926
- Zamarada candelabra D. S. Fletcher, 1974
- Zamarada chrysopa D. S. Fletcher, 1974
- Zamarada cinnamomata D. S. Fletcher, 1978
- Zamarada collarti Debauche, 1938
- Zamarada crystallophana Mabille, 1900
- Zamarada cucharita D. S. Fletcher, 1974
- Zamarada cydippe Herbulot, 1954
- Zamarada deceptrix Warren, 1914
- Zamarada delosis D. S. Fletcher, 1974
- Zamarada delta D. S. Fletcher, 1974
- Zamarada denticatella Prout, 1922
- Zamarada dentigera Warren, 1909
- Zamarada differens Bastelberger, 1907
- Zamarada dorsiplaga Prout, 1922
- Zamarada erugata D. S. Fletcher, 1974
- Zamarada euerces Prout, 1928
- Zamarada euphrosyne Oberthür, 1912
- Zamarada eurygnathus D. S. Fletcher, 1974
- Zamarada euterpina Oberthür, 1912
- Zamarada excavata Bethune-Baker, 1913
- Zamarada fessa Prout, 1912
- Zamarada flavicaput Warren, 1901
- Zamarada gamma D. S. Fletcher, 1958
- Zamarada glareosa Bastelberger, 1909
- Zamarada hyalinaria (Guenée, 1857)
- Zamarada ignicosta Prout, 1912
- Zamarada ilma Prout, 1922
- Zamarada iobathra Prout, 1932
- Zamarada keraia D. S. Fletcher, 1974
- Zamarada kiellandi Aarvik & Bjørnstad, 2007
- Zamarada labifera Prout, 1915
- Zamarada lequeuxi Herbulot, 1983
- Zamarada lima D. S. Fletcher, 1974
- Zamarada loleza Aarvik & Bjørnstad, 2007
- Zamarada longidens D. S. Fletcher, 1963
- Zamarada mashariki Aarvik & Bjørnstad, 2007
- Zamarada mckameyi Aarvik & Bjørnstad, 2007
- Zamarada melasma D. S. Fletcher, 1974
- Zamarada melpomene Oberthür, 1912
- Zamarada metrioscaphes Prout, 1912
- Zamarada micropomene Aarvik & Bjørnstad, 2007
- Zamarada montana Herbulot, 1979
- Zamarada musomae Aarvik & Bjørnstad, 2007
- Zamarada ndogo Aarvik & Bjørnstad, 2007
- Zamarada ochrata Warren, 1902
- Zamarada ordinaria Bethune-Baker, 1913
- Zamarada paxilla D. S. Fletcher, 1974
- Zamarada phaeozona Hampson, 1909
- Zamarada phratra D. S. Fletcher, 1978
- Zamarada pinheyi D. S. Fletcher, 1956
- Zamarada plana Bastelberger, 1909
- Zamarada platycephala D. S. Fletcher, 1974
- Zamarada polyctemon Prout, 1932
- Zamarada pringlei D. S. Fletcher, 1974
- Zamarada prolata D. S. Fletcher, 1974
- Zamarada psectra D. S. Fletcher, 1974
- Zamarada psi D. S. Fletcher, 1974
- Zamarada purimargo Prout, 1912
- Zamarada reflexaria (Walker, 1863)
- Zamarada rhamphis D. S. Fletcher, 1974
- Zamarada ruandana Herbulot, 1983
- Zamarada rubrifascia Pinhey, 1962
- Zamarada rufilinearia Swinhoe, 1904
- Zamarada saburra D. S. Fletcher, 1974
- Zamarada scintillans Bastelberger, 1909
- Zamarada seydeli D. S. Fletcher, 1974
- Zamarada torrida D. S. Fletcher, 1974
- Zamarada tristriga Aarvik & Bjørnstad, 2007
- Zamarada tristrigoides Aarvik & Bjørnstad, 2007
- Zamarada unisona D. S. Fletcher, 1974
- Zamarada usambarae Aarvik & Bjørnstad, 2007
- Zamarada usondo Aarvik & Bjørnstad, 2007
- Zamarada uzungwae Aarvik & Bjørnstad, 2007
- Zamarada varii D. S. Fletcher, 1974
- Zamarada variola D. S. Fletcher, 1974
- Zamarada vulpina Warren, 1897
- Zygophyxia roseocincta (Warren, 1899)

== Gracillariidae ==
- Acrocercops bifasciata (Walsingham, 1891)
- Caloptilia ingrata Triberti, 1989
- Caloptilia octopunctata (Turner, 1894)
- Corythoxestis aletreuta (Meyrick, 1936)
- Cremastobombycia morogorene de Prins, 2012
- Phodoryctis caerulea (Meyrick, 1912)
- Phyllocnistis citrella Stainton, 1856
- Phyllonorycter aarviki de Prins, 2012
- Phyllonorycter maererei de Prins, 2012
- Phyllonorycter mwatawalai de Prins, 2012

== Hepialidae ==
- Afrotheora brevivalva Nielsen & Scoble, 1986
- Afrotheora thermodes (Meyrick, 1921)
- Antihepialus keniae (Holland, 1892)
- Eudalaca aequifascia (Gaede, 1930)
- Eudalaca zernyi (Viette, 1950)
- Gorgopi caffra Walker, 1856
- Gorgopi libania (Stoll, 1781)
- Gorgopi salti Tams, 1952
- Gorgopi tanganyikaensis Viette, 1950

== Himantopteridae ==
- Doratopteryx steniptera Hampson, 1920
- Semioptila fulveolans (Mabille, 1897)
- Semioptila latifulva Hampson, 1920

== Lasiocampidae ==
- Anadiasa hartigi Szent-Ivány, 1942
- Beralade bistrigata Strand, 1909
- Beralade continua Aurivillius, 1905
- Beralade niphoessa Strand, 1909
- Bombycomorpha bifascia (Walker, 1855)
- Bombycopsis nigrovittata Aurivillius, 1927
- Bombycopsis venosa (Butler, 1895)
- Braura elgonensis (Kruck, 1940)
- Braura ligniclusa (Walker, 1865)
- Braura truncatum (Walker, 1855)
- Catalebeda strandi Hering, 1927
- Cheligium choerocampoides (Holland, 1893)
- Chionopsyche montana Aurivillius, 1909
- Chrysopsyche antennifera Strand, 1912
- Chrysopsyche lutulenta Tams, 1923
- Cleopatrina bilinea (Walker, 1855)
- Cleopatrina phocea (Druce, 1887)
- Dinometa maputuana (Wichgraf, 1906)
- Dollmania purpurascens (Aurivillius, 1909)
- Epicnapteroides lobata Strand, 1912
- Epitrabala nyassana (Aurivillius, 1909)
- Eucraera koellikerii (Dewitz, 1881)
- Eutricha morosa (Walker, 1865)
- Euwallengrenia reducta (Walker, 1855)
- Gonobombyx angulata Aurivillius, 1893
- Gonometa postica Walker, 1855
- Gonometa rufobrunnea Aurivillius, 1922
- Grammodora nigrolineata (Aurivillius, 1895)
- Grellada imitans (Aurivillius, 1893)
- Laeliopsis maculigera Strand, 1913
- Lechriolepis flavomarginata Aurivillius, 1927
- Lechriolepis griseola Aurivillius, 1927
- Lechriolepis ochraceola Strand, 1912
- Lechriolepis tessmanni Strand, 1912
- Leipoxais acharis Hering, 1928
- Leipoxais adoxa Hering, 1928
- Leipoxais humfreyi Aurivillius, 1915
- Leipoxais marginepunctata Holland, 1893
- Marmonna gella Zolotuhin & Prozorov, 2010
- Marmonna marmorata Zolotuhin & Prozorov, 2010
- Marmonna murphyi Zolotuhin & Prozorov, 2010
- Metajana kilwicola (Strand, 1912)
- Metajana marshalli Aurivillius, 1909
- Mimopacha gerstaeckerii (Dewitz, 1881)
- Mimopacha tripunctata (Aurivillius, 1905)
- Morongea arnoldi (Aurivillius, 1909)
- Morongea elfiora Zolotuhin & Prozorov, 2010
- Muzunguja rectilineata (Aurivillius, 1900)
- Odontocheilopteryx dollmani Tams, 1930
- Odontocheilopteryx myxa Wallengren, 1860
- Odontocheilopteryx scilla Gurkovich & Zolotuhin, 2009
- Odontopacha fenestrata Aurivillius, 1909
- Opisthodontia varezhka Zolotuhin & Prozorov, 2010
- Pachytrina crestalina Zolotuhin & Gurkovich, 2009
- Pachytrina honrathii (Dewitz, 1881)
- Pachytrina philargyria (Hering, 1928)
- Pachytrina verba Zolotuhin & Gurkovich, 2009
- Pachytrina wenigina Zolotuhin & Gurkovich, 2009
- Pallastica lateritia (Hering, 1928)
- Pallastica litlura Zolotuhin & Gurukovich, 2009
- Pallastica meloui (Riel, 1909)
- Pallastica pallens (Bethune-Baker, 1908)
- Pallastica redissa Zolotuhin & Gurkovich, 2009
- Philotherma grisea Aurivillius, 1914
- Philotherma rectilinea Strand, 1912
- Philotherma rosa (Druce, 1887)
- Philotherma rufescens Wichgraf, 1921
- Philotherma simplex Wichgraf, 1914
- Pseudolyra cervina (Aurivillius, 1905)
- Pseudolyra megista Tams, 1931
- Pseudometa choba (Druce, 1899)
- Pseudometa punctipennis (Strand, 1912)
- Rhinobombyx cuneata Aurivillius, 1879
- Schausinna affinis Aurivillius, 1910
- Sena donaldsoni (Holland, 1901)
- Sonitha lila Zolotuhin & Prozorov, 2010
- Sophyrita argibasis (Mabille, 1893)
- Stenophatna accolita Zolotuhin & Prozorov, 2010
- Stenophatna cymographa (Hampson, 1910)
- Stenophatna marshalli Aurivillius, 1909
- Stenophatna rothschildi (Tams, 1936)
- Stoermeriana abyssinicum (Aurivillius, 1908)
- Stoermeriana fusca (Aurivillius, 1905)
- Stoermeriana graberi (Dewitz, 1881)
- Stoermeriana sjostedti (Aurivillius, 1902)
- Streblote madibirense (Wichgraf, 1921)
- Streblote polydora (Druce, 1887)
- Trabala charon Druce, 1910
- Trichopisthia igneotincta (Aurivillius, 1909)

== Lecithoceridae ==
- Cophomantella bifrenata (Meyrick, 1921)
- Cophomantella cyclopodes (Meyrick, 1922)
- Odites armilligera Meyrick, 1922
- Protolychnis maculata (Walsingham, 1881)

== Lemoniidae ==
- Sabalia jacksoni Sharpe, 1890
- Sabalia picarina Walker, 1865
- Sabalia sericaria (Weymer, 1896)
- Sabalia tippelskirchi Karsch, 1898

== Limacodidae ==
- Afrobirthama flaccidia (Druce, 1899)
- Altha basalis West, 1940
- Birthama basibrunnea Swinhoe, 1904
- Chrysopoloma isabellina Aurivillius, 1895
- Cosuma flavimacula West, 1940
- Cosuma radiata Carcasson, 1965
- Ctenolita zernyi Hering, 1949
- Delorhachis kilosa West, 1940
- Halseyia angustilinea (Hering, 1937)
- Halseyia incisa (Hering, 1937)
- Halseyia lacides (Druce, 1899)
- Halseyia rufibasalis (Hering, 1928)
- Latoia urda (Druce, 1887)
- Latoiola bifascia Janse, 1964
- Lepidorytis sulcata Aurivillius, 1900
- Natada caliginosa West, 1940
- Niphadolepis alianta Karsch, 1899
- Niphadolepis elegans Wichgraf, 1921
- Omocena songeana West, 1940
- Parapluda invitabilis (Wallengren, 1860)
- Parasa costalis West, 1940
- Parasa lanceolata Hering, 1928
- Scotinocerides conspurcata (Aurivillius, 1895)
- Scotinocerides fasciata Hering, 1937
- Scotinocerides sigma Hering, 1937
- Scotinochroa charopocelis Tams, 1929
- Taeda aetitis Wallengren, 1863
- Taeda prasina Butler, 1896
- Trogocrada atmota Janse, 1964
- Zinara bilineata Hering, 1928

== Lymantriidae ==
- Abynotha meinickei Hering, 1926
- Aclonophlebia civilis Hering, 1926
- Aclonophlebia lugardi (Swinhoe, 1903)
- Aclonophlebia lymantrioides Hering, 1926
- Argyrostagma niobe (Weymer, 1896)
- Aroa discalis Walker, 1855
- Aroa melanoleuca Hampson, 1905
- Aroa pampoecila Collenette, 1930
- Aroa tomisa Druce, 1896
- Barlowia charax (Druce, 1896)
- Bracharoa charax (Druce, 1896)
- Bracharoa mixta (Snellen, 1872)
- Bracharoa reducta Hering, 1926
- Cadurca dianeura Hering, 1928
- Casama intermissa (Hering, 1926)
- Chrysocyma mesopotamia Hampson, 1905
- Conigephyra leucoptera (Hering, 1926)
- Conigephyra pallidula (Hering, 1926)
- Conigephyra splendida (Hering, 1926)
- Cropera sericea (Hampson, 1910)
- Cropera testacea Walker, 1855
- Cropera unipunctata Wichgraf, 1921
- Crorema adspersa (Herrich-Schäffer, 1854)
- Crorema evanescens (Hampson, 1910)
- Crorema fulvinotata (Butler, 1893)
- Dasychira albicostata (Holland, 1893)
- Dasychira barbara Hering, 1926
- Dasychira daphne Hering, 1926
- Dasychira daphnoides Hering, 1926
- Dasychira hastifera Hering, 1926
- Dasychira mkattana Strand, 1912
- Dasychira nebulifera Hering, 1926
- Dasychira nigerrima Hering, 1926
- Dasychira polia Hering, 1926
- Dasychira prospera Hering, 1926
- Dasychira punctifera (Walker, 1857)
- Dasychira scotina Hering, 1926
- Dasychira stegmanni Grünberg, 1910
- Dasychira subochracea Aurivillius, 1910
- Eudasychira amata (Hering, 1926)
- Eudasychira bokuma (Collenette, 1960)
- Eudasychira georgiana (Fawcett, 1900)
- Eudasychira metathermes (Hampson, 1905)
- Eudasychira poliotis (Hampson, 1910)
- Euproctis areolata Hering, 1928
- Euproctis beato Bryk, 1934
- Euproctis bigutta Holland, 1893
- Euproctis multidentata Hering, 1926
- Euproctis pallida (Kirby, 1896)
- Euproctis producta (Walker, 1863)
- Euproctis sericaria (Tams, 1924)
- Euproctoides eddela (Swinhoe, 1903)
- Hemerophanes diatoma (Hering, 1926)
- Hemerophanes libyra (Druce, 1896)
- Hemerophanes litigiosa (Hering, 1926)
- Heteronygmia dissimilis Aurivillius, 1910
- Homochira rendalli (Distant, 1897)
- Knappetra fasciata (Walker, 1855)
- Lacipa floridula (Hering, 1926)
- Lacipa melanosticta Hampson, 1910
- Lacipa pseudolacipa Hering, 1926
- Lacipa quadripunctata Dewitz, 1881
- Laelia amaura Hering, 1926
- Laelia extorta (Distant, 1897)
- Laelia extrema Hering, 1926
- Laelia fracta Schaus & Clements, 1893
- Laelia gephyra (Hering, 1926)
- Laelia janenschi Hering, 1926
- Laelia mediofasciata (Hering, 1926)
- Laelia ordinata (Karsch, 1895)
- Laelia phenax (Collenette, 1932)
- Laelia rogersi Bethune-Baker, 1913
- Laelia subrosea (Walker, 1855)
- Leptaroa deleta Hering, 1926
- Leptaroa ochricoloria Strand, 1911
- Leptaroa paupera Hering, 1926
- Leucoma discissa (Grünberg, 1910)
- Leucoma maria (Kirby, 1896)
- Leucoma parva (Plötz, 1880)
- Leucoma vosseleri Grünberg, 1907
- Leucoma xanthocephala (Hering, 1926)
- Lymantria pruinosa Hering, 1927
- Marblepsis tiphia (Swinhoe, 1903)
- Ogoa fuscovenata Wichgraf, 1922
- Ogoa simplex Walker, 1856
- Olapa nigricosta Hampson, 1905
- Olapa tavetensis (Holland, 1892)
- Otroeda vesperina Walker, 1854
- Palasea marwitzi Grünberg, 1907
- Palasea miniata Grünberg, 1907
- Pirga pellucida Wichgraf, 1922
- Pirga weisei Karsch, 1900
- Pirgula atrinotata (Butler, 1897)
- Polymona inaffinis Hering, 1926
- Ruanda aetheria Strand, 1909
- Schalidomitra ambages Strand, 1911
- Stracena bananae (Butler, 1897)
- Stracena pellucida Grünberg, 1907
- Stracena tavetensis (Holland, 1892)
- Stracilla translucida (Oberthür, 1880)

== Metarbelidae ==
- Bjoernstadia kasuluensis Lehmann, 2012
- Kroonia murphyi Lehmann, 2010
- Kroonia natalica (Hampson, 1910)
- Lebedodes ianrobertsoni Lehmann, 2009
- Lebedodes jeanneli Le Cerf, 1914
- Lebedodes leifaarviki Lehmann, 2009
- Lebedodes violascens Gaede, 1929
- Lebedodes willihaberlandi Lehmann, 2008
- Marshalliana jansei Gaede, 1929
- Metarbela abdulrahmani Lehmann, 2008
- Metarbela arcifera (Hampson, 1909)
- Metarbela chidzingai Lehmann, 2008
- Metarbela erecta Gaede, 1929
- Metarbela latifasciata Gaede, 1929
- Metarbela lornadepewae Lehmann, 2009
- Metarbela plagifera Gaede, 1929
- Metarbela triangularis Gaede, 1929
- Ortharbela cliftoni Lehmann, 2009
- Ortharbela guttata Aurivillius, 1910
- Ortharbela jurateae Lehmann, 2009
- Ortharbela sommerlattei Lehmann, 2008
- Paralebedella estherae Lehmann, 2008
- Salagena arcys D. S. Fletcher, 1968
- Salagena tessellata Distant, 1897
- Teragra quadrangula Gaede, 1929

== Micronoctuidae ==
- Micronola yemeni Fibiger, 2011

== Noctuidae ==
- Achaea catella Guenée, 1852
- Achaea catocaloides Guenée, 1852
- Achaea chrysopera Druce, 1912
- Achaea dasybasis Hampson, 1913
- Achaea lienardi (Boisduval, 1833)
- Achaea mercatoria (Fabricius, 1775)
- Achaea nigristriata Laporte, 1979
- Achaea praestans (Guenée, 1852)
- Acontia aarviki Hacker, Legrain & Fibiger, 2008
- Acontia antica Walker, 1862
- Acontia atripars Hampson, 1914
- Acontia aurelia Hacker, Legrain & Fibiger, 2008
- Acontia basifera Walker, 1857
- Acontia bellula Hacker, Legrain & Fibiger, 2010
- Acontia binominata (Butler, 1892)
- Acontia caeruleopicta Hampson, 1916
- Acontia caffraria (Cramer, 1777)
- Acontia callima Bethune-Baker, 1911
- Acontia carnescens (Hampson, 1910)
- Acontia conifrons (Aurivillius, 1879)
- Acontia dichroa (Hampson, 1914)
- Acontia discoidea Hopffer, 1857
- Acontia discoidoides Hacker, Legrain & Fibiger, 2008
- Acontia ectorrida (Hampson, 1916)
- Acontia florentissima Hacker, Legrain & Fibiger, 2008
- Acontia fuscoalba Hacker, Legrain & Fibiger, 2010
- Acontia guttifera Felder & Rogenhofer, 1874
- Acontia hampsoni Hacker, Legrain & Fibiger, 2008
- Acontia hemixanthia (Hampson, 1910)
- Acontia imitatrix Wallengren, 1856
- Acontia insocia (Walker, 1857)
- Acontia karachiensis Swinhoe, 1889
- Acontia lanzai (Berio, 1985)
- Acontia melaphora (Hampson, 1910)
- Acontia miogona (Hampson, 1916)
- Acontia natalis (Guenée, 1852)
- Acontia nephele Hampson, 1911
- Acontia niphogona (Hampson, 1909)
- Acontia notha Hacker, Legrain & Fibiger, 2010
- Acontia nubila Hampson, 1910
- Acontia obliqua Hacker, Legrain & Fibiger, 2010
- Acontia opalinoides Guenée, 1852
- Acontia paraalba Hacker, Legrain & Fibiger, 2010
- Acontia porphyrea (Butler, 1898)
- Acontia praealba Hacker, Legrain & Fibiger, 2010
- Acontia purpurata Hacker, Legrain & Fibiger, 2010
- Acontia schreieri Hacker, Legrain & Fibiger, 2010
- Acontia secta Guenée, 1852
- Acontia simo Wallengren, 1860
- Acontia sublactea Hacker, Legrain & Fibiger, 2008
- Acontia subnotha Hacker, Legrain & Fibiger, 2010
- Acontia szunyoghyi Hacker, Legrain & Fibiger, 2010
- Acontia tanzaniae Hacker, Legrain & Fibiger, 2010
- Acontia transfigurata Wallengren, 1856
- Acontia trimaculata Aurivillius, 1879
- Acontia wahlbergi Wallengren, 1856
- Acontia wiltshirei Hacker, Legrain & Fibiger, 2008
- Adisura bella Gaede, 1915
- Aegocera rectilinea Boisduval, 1836
- Aletopus imperialis Jordan, 1926
- Amazonides asciodes Berio, 1972
- Amazonides bioculata Berio, 1974
- Amazonides intermedia Berio, 1972
- Andobana multipunctata (Druce, 1899)
- Aspidifrontia biarcuata Berio, 1964
- Aspidifrontia oblata Berio, 1973
- Aspidifrontia semiarcuata Berio, 1973
- Aspidifrontia tanganykae Berio, 1964
- Athetis pectinifer (Aurivillius, 1910)
- Attatha ethiopica Hampson, 1910
- Audea zimmeri Berio, 1954
- Brevipecten cornuta Hampson, 1902
- Brevipecten tessenei Berio, 1939
- Calesia nigriannulata Hampson, 1926
- Calliodes pretiosissima Holland, 1892
- Callopistria latreillei (Duponchel, 1827)
- Callopistria maillardi (Guenée, 1862)
- Cerynea tetramelanosticta Berio, 1954
- Chaetostephana rendalli (Rothschild, 1896)
- Chalciope delta (Boisduval, 1833)
- Charitosemia geraldi (Kirby, 1896)
- Chlumetia cana Hampson, 1912
- Chrysodeixis acuta (Walker, [1858])
- Colbusa euclidica Walker, 1865
- Crameria amabilis (Drury, 1773)
- Ctenoplusia limbirena (Guenée, 1852)
- Cucullia chrysota Hampson, 1902
- Cucullia dallolmoi Berio, 1973
- Cucullia ikondae Berio, 1973
- Cucullia prolai Berio, 1956
- Cuneisigna obstans (Walker, 1858)
- Cyligramma conradsi Berio, 1954
- Cyligramma latona (Cramer, 1775)
- Cyligramma limacina (Guérin-Méneville, 1832)
- Cyligramma magus (Guérin-Méneville, [1844])
- Digama africana Swinhoe, 1907
- Digama daressalamica Strand, 1911
- Digama lithosioides Swinhoe, 1907
- Dysgonia derogans (Walker, 1858)
- Dysgonia torrida (Guenée, 1852)
- Egybolis vaillantina (Stoll, 1790)
- Entomogramma pardus Guenée, 1852
- Erebus walkeri (Butler, 1875)
- Ericeia lituraria (Saalmüller, 1880)
- Ethiopica inornata Berio, 1975
- Eublemma anachoresis (Wallengren, 1863)
- Eublemma perobliqua Hampson, 1910
- Eublemma rubripuncta (Hampson, 1902)
- Eudocima materna (Linnaeus, 1767)
- Euneophlebia spatulata Berio, 1972
- Eustrotia decissima (Walker, 1865)
- Eutelia amatrix Walker, 1858
- Eutelia polychorda Hampson, 1902
- Feliniopsis africana (Schaus & Clements, 1893)
- Feliniopsis annosa (Viette, 1963)
- Feliniopsis connivens (Felder & Rogenhofer, 1874)
- Feliniopsis consummata (Walker, 1857)
- Feliniopsis duponti (Laporte, 1974)
- Feliniopsis gueneei (Laporte, 1973)
- Feliniopsis hosplitoides (Laporte, 1979)
- Feliniopsis kipengerensis Hacker & Fibiger, 2007
- Feliniopsis knudlarseni Hacker & Fibiger, 2007
- Feliniopsis laportei Hacker & Fibiger, 2007
- Feliniopsis nigribarbata (Hampson, 1908)
- Feliniopsis rufigiji Hacker & Fibiger, 2007
- Feliniopsis satellitis (Berio, 1974)
- Feliniopsis subsagula (D. S. Fletcher, 1961)
- Feliniopsis talhouki (Wiltshire, 1983)
- Gesonia obeditalis Walker, 1859
- Grammodes geometrica (Fabricius, 1775)
- Grammodes stolida (Fabricius, 1775)
- Heliocheilus thomalae (Gaede, 1915)
- Heliophisma catocalina Holland, 1894
- Heraclia africana (Butler, 1875)
- Heraclia limbomaculata (Strand, 1909)
- Heraclia mozambica (Mabille, 1890)
- Heraclia perdix (Druce, 1887)
- Heraclia superba (Butler, 1875)
- Heraclia xanthopyga (Mabille, 1890)
- Heraclia zenkeri (Karsch, 1895)
- Hespagarista caudata (Dewitz, 1879)
- Hespagarista eburnea Jordan, 1915
- Hespagarista echione (Boisduval, 1847)
- Hiccoda roseitincta Hampson, 1920
- Honeyia burmeisteri Hacker & Fibiger, 2007
- Honeyia clearchus (Fawcett, 1916)
- Hypena abyssinialis Guenée, 1854
- Hypena striolalis Aurivillius, 1910
- Hypocala deflorata (Fabricius, 1794)
- Hypopyra africana (Kirby, 1896)
- Hypopyra allardi (Oberthür, 1878)
- Hypopyra capensis Herrich-Schäffer, 1854
- Leucania nebulosa Hampson, 1902
- Leucovis alba (Rothschild, 1897)
- Lyncestoides unilinea (Swinhoe, 1885)
- Marcipa mediana Hampson, 1926
- Marcipalina tanzaniensis (Pelletier, 1975)
- Masalia albipuncta (Hampson, 1910)
- Masalia beatrix (Moore, 1881)
- Masalia bimaculata (Moore, 1888)
- Masalia disticta (Hampson, 1902)
- Masalia flavistrigata (Hampson, 1903)
- Masalia galatheae (Wallengren, 1856)
- Masalia leucosticta (Hampson, 1902)
- Masalia mittoni (Pinhey, 1956)
- Masalia transvaalica (Distant, 1902)
- Matopo actinophora Hampson, 1909
- Medlerana bukobaenensis Laporte, 1979
- Mentaxya albifrons (Geyer, 1837)
- Mentaxya ignicollis (Walker, 1857)
- Mesoligia kettlewelli Wiltshire, 1983
- Micraxylia annulus Berio, 1972
- Micraxylia gigas Berio, 1972
- Mocis frugalis (Fabricius, 1775)
- Mocis mayeri (Boisduval, 1833)
- Mocis undata (Fabricius, 1775)
- Nyodes kilimandjaronis Laporte, 1979
- Oediplexia mesophaea Hampson, 1908
- Ogovia tavetensis Holland, 1892
- Omphaloceps daria (Druce, 1895)
- Ophiusa tirhaca (Cramer, 1777)
- Oraesia emarginata (Fabricius, 1794)
- Oraesia provocans Walker, [1858]
- Oraesia wintgensi (Strand, 1909)
- Ozarba accincta (Distant, 1898)
- Ozarba divisa Gaede, 1916
- Ozarba implicata Berio, 1940
- Ozarba morstatti Berio, 1938
- Pandesma quenavadi Guenée, 1852
- Paraegocera confluens (Weymer, 1892)
- Pericyma metaleuca Hampson, 1913
- Phaegorista bisignibasis Prout, 1918
- Phaegorista euryanassa (Druce, 1887)
- Phaegorista formosa Butler, 1877
- Phaegorista leucomelas (Herrich-Schäffer, 1855)
- Plecoptera diplosticha Hampson, 1926
- Plecoptera reversa (Walker, 1865)
- Plusiopalpa dichora Holland, 1894
- Polydesma collusoria (Berio, 1954)
- Polydesma umbricola Boisduval, 1833
- Procriosis dileuca Hampson, 1910
- Pseudopais nigrobasalis Bartel, 1903
- Pseudospiris paidiformis Butler, 1895
- Rhynchina leucodonta Hampson, 1910
- Rothia panganica Karsch, 1898
- Schalidomitra ambages Strand, 1911
- Schausia coryndoni (Rothschild, 1896)
- Sciomesa mesophaena (Aurivillius, 1910)
- Simplicia extinctalis (Zeller, 1852)
- Soloe plicata Pinhey, 1952
- Soloe tripunctata Druce, 1896
- Spirama glaucescens (Butler, 1893)
- Spodoptera mauritia (Boisduval, 1833)
- Stictoptera antemarginata Saalmüller, 1880
- Stilbotis ikondae Berio, 1972
- Stilbotis nigroides (Berio, 1972)
- Stilbotis persitriata (Berio, 1972)
- Stilbotis perspicua (Berio, 1974)
- Stilbotis pseudasciodes (Berio, 1977)
- Tathorhynchus leucobasis Bethune-Baker, 1911
- Tathorhynchus plumbea (Distant, 1898)
- Thiacidas callipona (Bethune-Baker, 1911)
- Thiacidas dukei (Pinhey, 1968)
- Thiacidas fasciata (Fawcett, 1917)
- Thiacidas leonie Hacker & Zilli, 2007
- Thiacidas permutata Hacker & Zilli, 2007
- Thiacidas roseotincta (Pinhey, 1962)
- Thiacidas senex (Bethune-Baker, 1911)
- Thiacidas smythi (Gaede, 1939)
- Thyatirina achatina (Weymer, 1896)
- Timora crofti Pinhey, 1956
- Trigonodes hyppasia (Cramer, 1779)
- Tuertella rema (Druce, 1910)
- Tycomarptes inferior (Guenée, 1852)
- Ulotrichopus eugeniae Saldaitis & Ivinskis, 2010
- Weymeria athene (Weymer, 1892)
- Xanthodesma aurantiaca Aurivillius, 1910
- Xanthodesma aurata Aurivillius, 1910

== Nolidae ==
- Acripia kilimandjaronis Strand, 1915
- Eligma bettiana Prout, 1923
- Meganola reubeni Agassiz, 2009
- Neaxestis aviuncis Wiltshire, 1985
- Nolatypa phoenicolepia Hampson, 1920

== Notodontidae ==
- Anaphe dempwolffi Strand, 1909
- Antheua eximia Kiriakoff, 1965
- Antheua gallans (Karsch, 1895)
- Antheua ornata (Walker, 1865)
- Antheua woerdeni (Snellen, 1872)
- Atrasana excellens (Strand, 1912)
- Desmeocraera annulosa Gaede, 1928
- Desmeocraera atribasalis (Hampson, 1910)
- Desmeocraera cana (Wichgraf, 1921)
- Desmeocraera forsteri Kiriakoff, 1973
- Desmeocraera impunctata Gaede, 1928
- Desmeocraera malindiana Kiriakoff, 1973
- Desmeocraera schevenaria Kiriakoff, 1973
- Desmeocraera tanzanica Kiriakoff, 1973
- Desmeocraerula angulata Gaede, 1928
- Epicerura pergrisea (Hampson, 1910)
- Epicerura plumosa Kiriakoff, 1962
- Epicerura steniptera (Hampson, 1910)
- Euanthia venosa Kiriakoff, 1962
- Eurystauridia olivacea (Gaede, 1928)
- Eurystauridia picta Kiriakoff, 1973
- Fentonina punctum Gaede, 1928
- Graphodonta fulva (Kiriakoff, 1962)
- Metarctina ochricostata Gaede, 1928
- Paracleapa psecas (Druce, 1901)
- Paradrallia rhodesi Bethune-Baker, 1908
- Phalera atrata (Grünberg, 1907)
- Phalera imitata Druce, 1896
- Phalera lydenburgi Distant, 1899
- Phalera postaurantia Rothschild, 1917
- Phalera princei Grünberg, 1909
- Plastystaura murina Kiriakoff, 1965
- Polienus capillata (Wallengren, 1875)
- Polienus fuscatus Janse, 1920
- Scalmicauda molesta (Strand, 1911)
- Scrancia danieli Kiriakoff, 1962
- Scrancia quinquelineata Kiriakoff, 1965
- Stemmatophalera semiflava (Hampson, 1910)
- Stenostaura malangae (Bethune-Baker, 1911)
- Xanthodonta debilis Gaede, 1928
- Xanthodonta unicornis Kiriakoff, 1961
- Zamana castanea (Wichgraf, 1922)

== Oecophoridae ==
- Stathmopoda daubanella (Legrand, 1958)

== Plutellidae ==
- Paraxenistis africana Mey, 2007
- Plutella xylostella (Linnaeus, 1758)

== Psychidae ==
- Apterona valvata (Gerstaecker, 1871)
- Chalia muenzneri Strand, 1911
- Eumeta hardenbergeri Bourgogne, 1955
- Eumeta ngarukensis Strand, 1909
- Melasina bostrychota Meyrick, 1920
- Melasina folligera Meyrick, 1920
- Melasina siticulosa Meyrick, 1920
- Melasina trepidans Meyrick, 1920
- Monda nigroapicalis Joicey & Talbot, 1924

== Pterophoridae ==
- Agdistis kenyana Arenberger, 1988
- Agdistis linnaei Gielis, 2008
- Agdistis malitiosa Meyrick, 1909
- Agdistis obstinata Meyrick, 1920
- Amblyptilia direptalis (Walker, 1864)
- Apoxyptilus anthites (Meyrick, 1936)
- Bipunctiphorus etiennei Gibeaux, 1994
- Emmelina amseli (Bigot, 1969)
- Eucapperia bullifera (Meyrick, 1918)
- Exelastis atomosa (Walsingham, 1885)
- Exelastis montischristi (Walsingham, 1897)
- Exelastis phlyctaenias (Meyrick, 1911)
- Hellinsia emmelinoida Gielis, 2008
- Hepalastis pumilio (Zeller, 1873)
- Inferuncus pentheres (Bigot, 1969)
- Inferuncus stolzei (Gielis, 1990)
- Lantanophaga pusillidactylus (Walker, 1864)
- Megalorhipida leptomeres (Meyrick, 1886)
- Megalorhipida leucodactylus (Fabricius, 1794)
- Ochyrotica bjoernstadti Gielis, 2008
- Paulianilus madecasseus Bigot, 1964
- Platyptilia farfarellus Zeller, 1867
- Platyptilia molopias Meyrick, 1906
- Platyptilia rhyncholoba Meyrick, 1924
- Platyptilia sabius (Felder & Rogenhofer, 1875)
- Platyptilia strictiformis Meyrick, 1932
- Pselnophorus jaechi (Arenberger, 1993)
- Pterophorus albidus (Zeller, 1852)
- Pterophorus bacteriopa (Meyrick, 1922)
- Pterophorus candidalis (Walker, 1864)
- Pterophorus rhyparias (Meyrick, 1908)
- Pterophorus uzungwe Gielis, 1991
- Sphenarches anisodactylus (Walker, 1864)
- Stenodacma wahlbergi (Zeller, 1852)
- Stenoptilia kiitulo Gielis, 2008
- Stenoptilodes taprobanes (Felder & Rogenhofer, 1875)
- Titanoptilus laniger Bigot, 1969

== Pyralidae ==
- Endotricha consobrinalis Zeller, 1852
- Pempelia morosalis (Saalmüller, 1880)

== Saturniidae ==
- Adafroptilum acuminatum (Darge, 2003)
- Adafroptilum bellum (Darge, Naumann & Brosch, 2003)
- Adafroptilum coloratum (Darge, Naumann & Brosch, 2003)
- Adafroptilum convictum Darge, 2007
- Adafroptilum hausmanni Darge, 2007
- Adafroptilum incana (Sonthonnax, 1899)
- Adafroptilum kalamboensis Darge, 2007
- Adafroptilum mikessensis Darge, 2007
- Adafroptilum permixtum (Darge, 2003)
- Adafroptilum rougerii Darge, 2006
- Adafroptilum scheveni (Darge, 2003)
- Adafroptilum septiguttata (Weymer, 1903)
- Antistathmoptera daltonae Tams, 1935
- Antistathmoptera granti Bouyer, 2006
- Antistathmoptera rectangulata Pinhey, 1968
- Argema besanti Rebel, 1895
- Argema kuhnei Pinhey, 1969
- Argema mimosae (Boisduval, 1847)
- Athletes gigas (Sonthonnax, 1902)
- Athletes semialba (Sonthonnax, 1904)
- Aurivillius arata (Westwood, 1849)
- Aurivillius divaricatus Bouvier, 1927
- Aurivillius fusca (Rothschild, 1895)
- Aurivillius oberthuri Bouvier, 1927
- Aurivillius orientalis Bouyer, 2007
- Aurivillius xerophilus Rougeot, 1977
- Bunaea alcinoe (Stoll, 1780)
- Bunaeopsis aurantiaca (Rothschild, 1895)
- Bunaeopsis bomfordi Pinhey, 1962
- Bunaeopsis chromata Darge, 2003
- Bunaeopsis dido (Maassen & Weymer, 1881)
- Bunaeopsis fervida Darge, 2003
- Bunaeopsis hersilia (Westwood, 1849)
- Bunaeopsis jacksoni (Jordan, 1908)
- Bunaeopsis licharbas (Maassen & Weymer, 1885)
- Bunaeopsis oubie (Guérin-Méneville, 1849)
- Bunaeopsis phidias (Weymer, 1909)
- Bunaeopsis rendalli (Rothschild, 1896)
- Bunaeopsis scheveniana Lemaire & Rougeot, 1974
- Bunaeopsis schoenheiti (Wichgraf, 1914)
- Bunaeopsis thyene (Weymer, 1896)
- Campimoptilum boulardi (Rougeot, 1974)
- Campimoptilum hollandi (Butler, 1898)
- Campimoptilum kuntzei (Dewitz, 1881)
- Campimoptilum pareensis Darge, 2008
- Campimoptilum sparsum Darge, 2008
- Carnegia mirabilis (Aurivillius, 1895)
- Cinabra hyperbius (Westwood, 1881)
- Cirina forda (Westwood, 1849)
- Decachorda bouvieri Hering, 1929
- Decachorda fulvia (Druce, 1886)
- Decachorda pomona (Weymer, 1892)
- Eosia insignis Le Cerf, 1911
- Eosia minettii Bouyer, 2008
- Epiphora albidus (Druce, 1886)
- Epiphora bauhiniae (Guérin-Méneville, 1832)
- Epiphora bedoci (Bouvier, 1829)
- Epiphora boursini (Testout, 1936)
- Epiphora brunnea (Bouvier, 1930)
- Epiphora congolana (Bouvier, 1929)
- Epiphora cotei (Testout, 1935)
- Epiphora getula (Maassen & Weymer, 1885)
- Epiphora imperator (Stoneham, 1933)
- Epiphora kipengerensis Darge, 2007
- Epiphora lecerfi (Testout, 1936)
- Epiphora lugardi Kirby, 1894
- Epiphora magdalena Grünberg, 1909
- Epiphora manowensis (Gschwandner, 1923)
- Epiphora mythimnia (Westwood, 1849)
- Epiphora nubilosa (Testout, 1938)
- Epiphora pelosoma Rothschild, 1907
- Epiphora pygmaea (Bouvier, 1929)
- Epiphora rectifascia Rothschild, 1907
- Epiphora rotunda Naumann, 2006
- Epiphora werneri Darge, 2007
- Gonimbrasia alcestris (Weymer, 1907)
- Gonimbrasia anna (Maassen & Weymer, 1885)
- Gonimbrasia belina (Westwood, 1849)
- Gonimbrasia cocaulti Darge & Terral, 1992
- Gonimbrasia conradsi (Rebel, 1906)
- Gonimbrasia hoehnelii (Rogenhofer, 1891)
- Gonimbrasia miranda Darge, 2005
- Gonimbrasia osiris (Druce, 1896)
- Gonimbrasia rectilineata (Sonthonnax, 1899)
- Gonimbrasia tyrrhea (Cramer, 1775)
- Gonimbrasia ufipana Strand, 1911
- Gonimbrasia ukerewensis (Rebel, 1922)
- Gonimbrasia wahlbergii (Boisduval, 1847)
- Gonimbrasia zambesina (Walker, 1865)
- Goodia oxytela Jordan, 1922
- Goodia unguiculata Bouvier, 1936
- Gynanisa albescens Sonthonnax, 1904
- Gynanisa ata Strand, 1911
- Gynanisa carcassoni Rougeot, 1974
- Gynanisa commixta Darge, 2008
- Gynanisa jama Rebel, 1915
- Gynanisa maja (Klug, 1836)
- Gynanisa minettii Darge, 2003
- Gynanisa nigra Bouvier, 1927
- Gynanisa westwoodi Rothschild, 1895
- Heniocha dyops (Maassen, 1872)
- Heniocha marnois (Rogenhofer, 1891)
- Heniocha puderosa Darge, 2004
- Heniocha vingerhoedti Bouyer, 1992
- Holocerina agomensis (Karsch, 1896)
- Holocerina istsariensis Stoneham, 1962
- Holocerina orientalis Bouyer, 2001
- Holocerina smilax (Westwood, 1849)
- Imbrasia epimethea (Drury, 1772)
- Imbrasia ertli Rebel, 1904
- Imbrasia orientalis Rougeot, 1962
- Leucopteryx ansorgei (Rothschild, 1897)
- Leucopteryx mollis (Butler, 1889)
- Lobobunaea acetes (Westwood, 1849)
- Lobobunaea angasana (Westwood, 1849)
- Lobobunaea falcatissima Rougeot, 1962
- Lobobunaea phaedusa (Drury, 1782)
- Lobobunaea rosea (Sonthonnax, 1899)
- Lobobunaea saturnus (Fabricius, 1793)
- Lobobunaea tanganyikae (Sonthonnax, 1899)
- Ludia delegorguei (Boisduval, 1847)
- Ludia dentata (Hampson, 1891)
- Ludia goniata Rothschild, 1907
- Ludia hansali Felder, 1874
- Ludia nyassana Strand, 1911
- Ludia orinoptena Karsch, 1892
- Ludia pseudovetusta Rougeot, 1978
- Melanocera menippe (Westwood, 1849)
- Melanocera parva Rothschild, 1907
- Melanocera sufferti (Weymer, 1896)
- Micragone agathylla (Westwood, 1849)
- Micragone amaniana Darge, 2010
- Micragone ansorgei (Rothschild, 1907)
- Micragone cana (Aurivillius, 1893)
- Micragone gaetani Bouyer, 2008
- Micragone kalamboensis Darge, 2010
- Micragone kitaiensis Darge, 2010
- Micragone nyasae Rougeot, 1962
- Micragone remota Darge, 2005
- Micragone trefurthi (Strand, 1909)
- Nudaurelia anthina (Karsch, 1892)
- Nudaurelia bicolor Bouvier, 1930
- Nudaurelia broschi Darge, 2002
- Nudaurelia dargei Bouyer, 2008
- Nudaurelia dione (Fabricius, 1793)
- Nudaurelia eblis Strecker, 1876
- Nudaurelia formosissima Darge, 2009
- Nudaurelia hurumai Darge, 2003
- Nudaurelia kiliensis Darge, 2009
- Nudaurelia kilumilorum Darge, 2002
- Nudaurelia kohlli Darge, 2009
- Nudaurelia krucki Hering, 1930
- Nudaurelia macrops Rebel, 1917
- Nudaurelia macrothyris (Rothschild, 1906)
- Nudaurelia maranguensis Darge, 2009
- Nudaurelia mpalensis Sonthonnax, 1901
- Nudaurelia myrtea Rebel, 1917
- Nudaurelia nyassana (Rothschild, 1907)
- Nudaurelia rectilineata Sonthonnax, 1901
- Nudaurelia renvazorum Darge, 2002
- Nudaurelia rhodina (Rothschild, 1907)
- Nudaurelia richelmanni Weymer, 1908
- Nudaurelia rubra Bouvier, 1927
- Nudaurelia venus Rebel, 1906
- Nudaurelia wahlbergiana Rougeot, 1972
- Orthogonioptilum adiegetum Karsch, 1892
- Orthogonioptilum fontainei Rougeot, 1962
- Orthogonioptilum violascens (Rebel, 1914)
- Parusta thelxione Fawcett, 1915
- Parusta xanthops Rothschild, 1907
- Protogynanisa probsti Bouyer, 2001
- Pselaphelia flavivitta (Walker, 1862)
- Pselaphelia kitchingi Darge, 2007
- Pselaphelia laclosi Darge, 2002
- Pselaphelia mariatheresae Darge, 2002
- Pseudantheraea discrepans (Butler, 1878)
- Pseudaphelia apollinaris (Boisduval, 1847)
- Pseudaphelia flava Bouvier, 1930
- Pseudaphelia roseibrunnea Gaede, 1927
- Pseudimbrasia deyrollei (J. Thomson, 1858)
- Pseudobunaea alinda (Sonthonnax, 1899)
- Pseudobunaea bjornstadi Bouyer, 2006
- Pseudobunaea bondwana Darge, 2009
- Pseudobunaea callista (Jordan, 1910)
- Pseudobunaea claryi Darge, 2009
- Pseudobunaea cleopatra (Aurivillius, 1893)
- Pseudobunaea elucida Darge, 2009
- Pseudobunaea epithyrena (Maassen & Weymer, 1885)
- Pseudobunaea heyeri (Weymer, 1896)
- Pseudobunaea irius (Fabricius, 1793)
- Pseudobunaea mbiziana Darge, 2009
- Pseudobunaea miriakambana Darge, 2009
- Pseudobunaea mwangomoi Darge, 2009
- Pseudobunaea natalensis (Aurivillius, 1893)
- Pseudobunaea pallens (Sonthonnax, 1899)
- Pseudobunaea parathyrrena (Bouvier, 1927)
- Pseudobunaea santini Darge, 2009
- Pseudobunaea tyrrhena (Westwood, 1849)
- Pseudoludia suavis (Rothschild, 1907)
- Rohaniella pygmaea (Maassen & Weymer, 1885)
- Tagoropsiella expansa Darge, 2008
- Tagoropsiella ikondae (Rougeot, 1974)
- Tagoropsiella kaguruensis Darge, 2008
- Tagoropsiella mbiziensis Darge, 2008
- Tagoropsiella rungwensis Darge, 2008
- Tagoropsis flavinata (Walker, 1865)
- Tagoropsis hanningtoni (Butler, 1883)
- Tagoropsis rougeoti D. S. Fletcher, 1968
- Tagoropsis sabulosa Rothschild, 1907
- Ubaena dolabella (Druce, 1886)
- Ubaena fuelleborniana Karsch, 1900
- Ubaena lequeuxi Darge & Terral, 1988
- Ubaena sabunii Darge & Kilumile, 2004
- Urota sinope (Westwood, 1849)
- Usta alba Terral & Lequeux, 1991
- Usta angulata Rothschild, 1895
- Usta subangulata Bouvier, 1930
- Usta terpsichore (Maassen & Weymer, 1885)
- Yatanga smithi (Holland, 1892)

== Sesiidae ==
- Aenigmina aenea Le Cerf, 1912
- Camaegeria massai Bartsch & Berg, 2012
- Euhagena nobilis (Druce, 1910)
- Melittia chalconota Hampson, 1910
- Melittia endoxantha Hampson, 1919
- Melittia oedipus Oberthür, 1878
- Melittia usambara Le Cerf, 1917
- Pseudomelittia berlandi Le Cerf, 1917
- Sura ruficauda (Rothschild, 1911)

== Sphingidae ==
- Acanthosphinx guessfeldti (Dewitz, 1879)
- Acherontia atropos (Linnaeus, 1758)
- Afroclanis calcareus (Rothschild & Jordan, 1907)
- Afroclanis neavi (Hampson, 1910)
- Afrosphinx amabilis (Jordan, 1911)
- Agrius convolvuli (Linnaeus, 1758)
- Antinephele lunulata Rothschild & Jordan, 1903
- Antinephele maculifera Holland, 1889
- Basiothia aureata (Karsch, 1891)
- Basiothia medea (Fabricius, 1781)
- Callosphingia circe (Fawcett, 1915)
- Centroctena rutherfordi (Druce, 1882)
- Chaerocina dohertyi Rothschild & Jordan, 1903
- Chaerocina livingstonensis Darge, 2006
- Chaerocina usambarensis Darge & Basquin, 2008
- Chloroclanis virescens (Butler, 1882)
- Coelonia fulvinotata (Butler, 1875)
- Daphnis nerii (Linnaeus, 1758)
- Dovania poecila Rothschild & Jordan, 1903
- Euchloron megaera (Linnaeus, 1758)
- Falcatula falcata (Rothschild & Jordan, 1903)
- Hippotion celerio (Linnaeus, 1758)
- Hippotion eson (Cramer, 1779)
- Hippotion irregularis (Walker, 1856)
- Hippotion moorei Jordan, 1926
- Hippotion osiris (Dalman, 1823)
- Hippotion rebeli Rothschild & Jordan, 1903
- Hippotion roseipennis (Butler, 1882)
- Hyles livornica (Esper, 1780)
- Leptoclanis pulchra Rothschild & Jordan, 1903
- Leucophlebia afra Karsch, 1891
- Leucostrophus alterhirundo d'Abrera, 1987
- Likoma apicalis Rothschild & Jordan, 1903
- Likoma crenata Rothschild & Jordan, 1907
- Litosphingia corticea Jordan, 1920
- Lophostethus dumolinii (Angas, 1849)
- Macropoliana ferax (Rothschild & Jordan, 1916)
- Macropoliana natalensis (Butler, 1875)
- Macropoliana scheveni Carcasson, 1972
- Microclanis erlangeri (Rothschild & Jordan, 1903)
- Neoclanis basalis (Walker, 1866)
- Neopolyptychus compar (Rothschild & Jordan, 1903)
- Neopolyptychus convexus (Rothschild & Jordan, 1903)
- Neopolyptychus serrator (Jordan, 1929)
- Nephele aequivalens (Walker, 1856)
- Nephele bipartita Butler, 1878
- Nephele comma Hopffer, 1857
- Nephele lannini Jordan, 1926
- Nephele monostigma Clark, 1925
- Nephele rosae Butler, 1875
- Pantophaea favillacea (Walker, 1866)
- Phylloxiphia metria (Jordan, 1920)
- Phylloxiphia punctum (Rothschild, 1907)
- Phylloxiphia vicina (Rothschild & Jordan, 1915)
- Platysphinx piabilis (Distant, 1897)
- Platysphinx stigmatica (Mabille, 1878)
- Poliana wintgensi (Strand, 1910)
- Polyptychoides digitatus (Karsch, 1891)
- Polyptychoides erosus (Jordan, 1923)
- Polyptychoides grayii (Walker, 1856)
- Polyptychopsis marshalli (Rothschild & Jordan, 1903)
- Polyptychus andosa Walker, 1856
- Polyptychus aurora Clark, 1936
- Polyptychus baxteri Rothschild & Jordan, 1908
- Polyptychus coryndoni Rothschild & Jordan, 1903
- Praedora marshalli Rothschild & Jordan, 1903
- Praedora plagiata Rothschild & Jordan, 1903
- Pseudoclanis kenyae Clark, 1928
- Pseudoclanis occidentalis Rothschild & Jordan, 1903
- Pseudoclanis postica (Walker, 1856)
- Rhadinopasa hornimani (Druce, 1880)
- Rhodafra marshalli Rothschild & Jordan, 1903
- Rufoclanis fulgurans (Rothschild & Jordan, 1903)
- Rufoclanis maccleeryi Carcasson, 1968
- Rufoclanis numosae (Wallengren, 1860)
- Sphingonaepiopsis nana (Walker, 1856)
- Temnora albilinea Rothschild, 1904
- Temnora atrofasciata Holland, 1889
- Temnora burdoni Carcasson, 1968
- Temnora crenulata (Holland, 1893)
- Temnora fumosa (Walker, 1856)
- Temnora funebris (Holland, 1893)
- Temnora griseata Rothschild & Jordan, 1903
- Temnora hirsutus Darge, 2004
- Temnora masungai Darge, 2009
- Temnora natalis Walker, 1856
- Temnora plagiata Walker, 1856
- Temnora pseudopylas (Rothschild, 1894)
- Temnora pylades Rothschild & Jordan, 1903
- Temnora robertsoni Carcasson, 1968
- Temnora sardanus (Walker, 1856)
- Temnora scitula (Holland, 1889)
- Temnora zantus (Herrich-Schäffer, 1854)
- Theretra capensis (Linnaeus, 1764)
- Theretra jugurtha (Boisduval, 1875)
- Theretra orpheus (Herrich-Schäffer, 1854)
- Xanthopan morganii (Walker, 1856)

== Thyrididae ==
- Arniocera amoena Jordan, 1907
- Arniocera cyanoxantha (Mabille, 1893)
- Arniocera elata Jordan, 1915
- Arniocera imperialis Butler, 1898
- Arniocera lautuscula (Karsch, 1897)
- Arniocera lugubris Gaede, 1926
- Arniocera sternecki Rogenhofer, 1891
- Cecidothyris pexa (Hampson, 1906)
- Chrysotypus dawsoni Distant, 1897
- Chrysotypus reticulatus Whalley, 1971
- Cornuterus nigropunctula (Pagenstecher, 1892)
- Dilophura caudata (Jordan, 1907)
- Dysodia amania Whalley, 1968
- Dysodia fenestratella Warren, 1900
- Dysodia fumida Whalley, 1968
- Dysodia hamata Whalley, 1968
- Dysodia incognita Whalley, 1968
- Dysodia intermedia (Walker, 1865)
- Dysodia lutescens Whalley, 1968
- Dysodia vitrina (Boisduval, 1829)
- Epaena inops (Gaede, 1917)
- Epaena xystica Whalley, 1971
- Hypolamprus janenschi (Gaede, 1917)
- Kuja majuscula (Gaede, 1917)
- Marmax smaragdina (Butler, 1888)
- Marmax vicaria (Walker, 1854)
- Netrocera diffinis Jordan, 1907
- Netrocera hemichrysa (Hampson, 1910)
- Netrocera setioides Felder, 1874
- Rhodoneura disjuncta (Gaede, 1929)
- Striglina minutula (Saalmüller, 1880)

== Tineidae ==
- Acridotarsa melipecta (Meyrick, 1915)
- Amphixystis beverrasella (Legrand, 1966)
- Amphixystis roseostrigella (Legrand, 1966)
- Ateliotum resurgens (Gozmány, 1969)
- Autochthonus chalybiellus Walsingham, 1891
- Ceratophaga lichmodes (Meyrick, 1921)
- Ceratophaga obnoxia (Meyrick, 1917)
- Ceratophaga vastellus (Zeller, 1852)
- Ceratophaga xanthastis (Meyrick, 1908)
- Cimitra estimata (Gozmány, 1965)
- Cimitra horridella (Walker, 1863)
- Criticonoma aspergata Gozmány & Vári, 1973
- Cylicobathra argocoma (Meyrick, 1914)
- Cylicobathra chionarga Meyrick, 1920
- Drosica abjectella Walker, 1963
- Edosa crassivalva (Gozmány, 1968)
- Edosa phlegethon (Gozmány, 1968)
- Edosa pyroceps (Gozmány, 1967)
- Hapsifera glebata Meyrick, 1908
- Hapsifera hastata Gozmány, 1969
- Hapsifera hilaris Gozmány, 1965
- Hapsifera lecithala Gozmány & Vári, 1973
- Hapsifera lithocentra Meyrick, 1920
- Hapsifera luteata Gozmány, 1965
- Hapsifera revoluta Meyrick, 1914
- Hapsifera septica Meyrick, 1908
- Hapsiferona glareosa (Meyrick, 1912)
- Hyperbola hemispina Gozmány, 1969
- Hyperbola hesperis Gozmány, 1967
- Hyperbola mellichroa (Gozmány, 1968)
- Hyperbola moschias (Meyrick, 1914)
- Hyperbola phocina (Meyrick, 1908)
- Hyperbola somphota (Meyrick, 1920)
- Hyperbola zicsii Gozmány, 1965
- Merunympha nipha Gozmány, 1969
- Monopis addenda Gozmány, 1965
- Monopis anaphracta Gozmány, 1967
- Monopis immaculata Gozmány, 1967
- Monopis megalodelta Meyrick, 1908
- Monopis meyricki Gozmány, 1967
- Monopis persimilis Gozmány, 1965
- Monopis rejectella (Walker, 1864)
- Monopis speculella (Zeller, 1852)
- Organodesma merui Gozmány, 1969
- Organodesma onomasta Gozmány & Vári, 1975
- Pachypsaltis pachystoma (Meyrick, 1920)
- Perissomastix christinae Gozmány, 1965
- Perissomastix meruicola Gozmány, 1969
- Perissomastix mili Gozmány, 1965
- Perissomastix praxis Gozmány, 1969
- Perissomastix szunyoghyi Gozmány, 1969
- Perissomastix titanea Gozmány, 1967
- Perissomastix topaz Gozmány, 1967
- Phthoropoea pycnosaris (Meyrick, 1932)
- Pitharcha atrisecta (Meyrick, 1918)
- Pitharcha chalinaea Meyrick, 1908
- Pitharcha fasciata (Ghesquière, 1940)
- Proterospastis abscisa (Gozmány, 1967)
- Rhodobates emorsus Gozmány, 1967
- Scalmatica zernyi Gozmány, 1967
- Silosca mariae Gozmány, 1965
- Sphallestasis cyclivalva (Gozmány, 1969)
- Sphallestasis epiforma (Gozmány, 1967)
- Sphallestasis exiguens (Gozmány, 1967)
- Sphallestasis nagyi (Gozmány, 1969)
- Sphallestasis oenopis (Meyrick, 1908)
- Sphallestasis pectinigera (Gozmány, 1969)
- Sphallestasis saskai (Gozmány, 1969)
- Sphallestasis spatulata (Gozmány, 1967)
- Sphallestasis szunyoghyi (Gozmány, 1969)
- Syngeneta sordida Gozmány, 1967
- Tinea nesiastis (Meyrick, 1911)
- Tinissa spaniastra Meyrick, 1932
- Tiquadra lichenea Walsingham, 1897
- Trichophaga cuspidata Gozmány, 1967
- Trichophaga mormopis Meyrick, 1935

== Tischeriidae ==
- Coptotriche pulverescens (Meyrick, 1936)

== Tortricidae ==
- Accra plumbeana Razowski, 1966
- Accra tanzanica Razowski, 1990
- Actihema hemiacta (Meyrick, 1920)
- Afrocostosa flaviapicella Aarvik, 2004
- Afroploce karsholti Aarvik, 2004
- Afropoecilia kituloensis Aarvik, 2010
- Afrothreutes madoffei Aarvik, 2004
- Bactra helgei Aarvik, 2008
- Bactra jansei Diakonoff, 1963
- Bactra magnei Aarvik, 2008
- Bactra sinassula Diakonoff, 1963
- Bactra tylophora Diakonoff, 1963
- Basigonia anisoscia Diakonoff, 1983
- Capua pusillana (Walker, 1863)
- Cochylimorpha africana Aarvik, 2010
- Cochylimorpha exoterica (Meyrick, 1924)
- Cosmorrhyncha acrocosma (Meyrick, 1908)
- Crimnologa perspicua Meyrick, 1920
- Cryptaspasma caryothicta (Meyrick, 1920)
- Cryptaspasma kigomana Aarvik, 2005
- Cryptaspasma phycitinana Aarvik, 2005
- Cryptaspasma subtilis Diakonoff, 1959
- Cryptophlebia semilunana (Saalmüller, 1880)
- Cydia leptogramma (Meyrick, 1913)
- Cydia malesana (Meyrick, 1920)
- Eccopsis incultana (Walker, 1863)
- Eccopsis morogoro Aarvik, 2004
- Eccopsis nebulana Walsingham, 1891
- Eccopsis nicicecilie Aarvik, 2004
- Eccopsis ochrana Aarvik, 2004
- Eccopsis praecedens Walsingham, 1897
- Eccopsis wahlbergiana Zeller, 1852
- Epiblema riciniata (Meyrick, 1911)
- Eucosma ioreas Meyrick, 1920
- Eucosma xenarcha Meyrick, 1920
- Eugnosta matengana Razowski, 1993
- Eugnosta misella Razowski, 1993
- Eugnosta percnoptila (Meyrick, 1933)
- Eugnosta uganoa Razowski, 1993
- Eugnosta unifasciana Aarvik, 2010
- Eupoecilia kruegeriana Razowski, 1993
- Geita bjoernstadi Aarvik, 2004
- Gypsonoma paradelta (Meyrick, 1925)
- Leguminovora glycinivorella (Matsumura, 1898)
- Megalota archana Aarvik, 2004
- Megalota rhopalitis (Meyrick, 1920)
- Metamesia elegans (Walsingham, 1881)
- Metendothenia balanacma (Meyrick, 1914)
- Multiquaestia andersi Aarvik & Karisch, 2009
- Multiquaestia fibigeri Aarvik & Karisch, 2009
- Multiquaestia iringana Aarvik & Karisch, 2009
- Multiquaestia purana Aarvik & Karisch, 2009
- Olethreutes metaplecta (Meyrick, 1920)
- Pammenopsis critica (Meyrick, 1905)
- Paraeccopsis insellata (Meyrick, 1920)
- Sambara sinuana Aarvik, 2004
- Syntozyga triangulana Aarvik, 2008
- Thylacogaster cyanophaea (Meyrick, 1927)
- Tortrix dinota Meyrick, 1918
- Tortrix platystega Meyrick, 1920
- Tortrix triadelpha Meyrick, 1920
- Trymalitis scalifera Meyrick, 1912

== Uraniidae ==
- Chrysiridia croesus (Gerstaecker, 1871)

== Xyloryctidae ==
- Eretmocera derogatella (Walker, 1864)
- Eretmocera dorsistrigata Walsingham, 1889
- Eretmocera miniata Walsingham, 1889

== Yponomeutidae ==
- Yponomeuta fumigatus Zeller, 1852
- Yponomeuta morbillosus (Zeller, 1877)

== Zygaenidae ==
- Astyloneura difformis (Jordan, 1907)
- Astyloneura meridionalis (Hampson, 1920)
- Astyloneura nitens Jordan, 1907
- Astyloneura ostia (Druce, 1896)
- Neobalataea nigriventris Alberti, 1954
- Saliunca assimilis Jordan, 1907
- Saliunca meruana Aurivillius, 1910
