= Megalota ouentoroi =

Scientific classification
- Kingdom: Animalia
- Phylum: Arthropoda
- Class: Insecta
- Order: Lepidoptera
- Family: Tortricidae
- Genus: Megalota
- Species: M. ouentoroi

Binomial name
- Megalota ouentoroi Razowski, 2013

Species of moth

Megalota ouentoroi is a species of moth of the family Tortricidae. It is found in New Caledonia in the southwest Pacific Ocean.

The wingspan is about 15 mm.
