= Lumaria rhythmologa =

Scientific classification
- Kingdom: Animalia
- Phylum: Arthropoda
- Class: Insecta
- Order: Lepidoptera
- Family: Tortricidae
- Genus: Lumaria
- Species: L. rhythmologa

Binomial name
- Lumaria rhythmologa (Meyrick in Caradja & Meyrick, 1937)

Synonyms
- Tortrix rhythmologa Meyrick in Caradja & Meyrick, 1937; Lumaria rhytmologa Razowski, 1993

Species of moth

Lumaria rhythmologa is a species of moth of the family Tortricidae. It is found in China.
