= Protinopalpa ferreoflava =

Scientific classification
- Kingdom: Animalia
- Phylum: Arthropoda
- Clade: Pancrustacea
- Class: Insecta
- Order: Lepidoptera
- Family: Crambidae
- Genus: Protinopalpa
- Species: P. ferreoflava

Binomial name
- Protinopalpa ferreoflava (Strand, 1911)

Synonyms
- Protinopalpella ferreoflava Strand, 1911; Protinopalpa ferreoflava ab. pygmaena Strand, 1911

Species of moth

Protinopalpa ferreoflava is a moth in the family Crambidae. It was described by Strand in 1911. It is found in Togo.
