= Lumaria zeugmatovalva =

Scientific classification
- Kingdom: Animalia
- Phylum: Arthropoda
- Class: Insecta
- Order: Lepidoptera
- Family: Tortricidae
- Genus: Lumaria
- Species: L. zeugmatovalva

Binomial name
- Lumaria zeugmatovalva Razowski, 1984

Species of moth

Lumaria zeugmatovalva is a species of moth of the family Tortricidae. It is found in Shanxi, China.
