= Lumaria afrotropica =

Scientific classification
- Kingdom: Animalia
- Phylum: Arthropoda
- Class: Insecta
- Order: Lepidoptera
- Family: Tortricidae
- Genus: Lumaria
- Species: L. afrotropica

Binomial name
- Lumaria afrotropica Razowski, 2002

Species of moth

Lumaria afrotropica is a species of moth of the family Tortricidae. It is found in Cameroon.

The wingspan is about 9 mm.
