= Inferuncus nigreus =

Scientific classification
- Kingdom: Animalia
- Phylum: Arthropoda
- Clade: Pancrustacea
- Class: Insecta
- Order: Lepidoptera
- Family: Pterophoridae
- Genus: Inferuncus
- Species: I. nigreus

Binomial name
- Inferuncus nigreus Gibeaux, 1994

Species of plume moth

Inferuncus nigreus is a moth of the family Pterophoridae that is known from Madagascar.
