= Megalota =

Scientific classification
- Kingdom: Animalia
- Phylum: Arthropoda
- Class: Insecta
- Order: Lepidoptera
- Family: Tortricidae
- Tribe: Olethreutini
- Genus: Megalota; Diakonoff, 1966

Genus of tortrix moths

Megalota is a genus of moths belonging to the subfamily Olethreutinae of the family Tortricidae.

== Species ==
- delphinosema species group
  - Megalota beckeri J.W. Brown, 2009
  - Megalota bicolorana J.W. Brown, 2009
  - Megalota ceratovalva J.W. Brown, 2009
  - Megalota chamelana J.W. Brown, 2009
  - Megalota crassana J.W. Brown, 2009
  - Megalota deceptana J.W. Brown, 2009
  - Megalota delphinosema (Walsingham, 1914)
  - Megalota flintana J.W. Brown, 2009
  - Megalota gutierrezi J.W. Brown, 2009
  - Megalota jamaicana J.W. Brown, 2009
  - Megalota longisetana J.W. Brown, 2009
  - Megalota ochreoapex J.W. Brown, 2009
  - Megalota ricana J.W. Brown, 2009
  - Megalota simpliciana J.W. Brown, 2009
  - Megalota spinulosa J.W. Brown, 2009
- pastranai species group
  - Megalota pastranai J.W. Brown, 2009
- plenana species group
  - Megalota plenana (Walker, 1863)
- submicans species group
  - Megalota aquilonaris J.W. Brown, 2009
  - Megalota cacaulana J.W. Brown, 2009
  - Megalota macrososia J.W. Brown, 2009
  - Megalota peruviana J.W. Brown, 2009
  - Megalota submicans (Walsingham, 1897)
  - Megalota synchysis J.W. Brown, 2009
  - Megalota vulgaris J.W. Brown, 2009
- unknown species group
  - Megalota anceps (Meyrick, 1909)
  - Megalota antefracta Diakonoff, 1981
  - Megalota archana Aarvik, 2004
  - Megalota fallax (Meyrick, 1909)
  - Megalota geminus Diakonoff, 1973
  - Megalota helicana (Meyrick, 1881)
  - Megalota johni Razowksi & B. Landry, 2008
  - Megalota namibiana Aarvik, 2004
  - Megalota ouentoroi Razowski, 2013
  - Megalota purpurana Aarvik, 2004
  - Megalota rhopalitis (Meyrick, 1920)
  - Megalota solida Diakonoff, 1973
  - Megalota uncimacula (Turner, 1925)
  - Megalota vera Diakonoff, 1966

== See also ==
- List of Tortricidae genera
