= Lumaria petrophora =

Scientific classification
- Kingdom: Animalia
- Phylum: Arthropoda
- Class: Insecta
- Order: Lepidoptera
- Family: Tortricidae
- Genus: Lumaria
- Species: L. petrophora

Binomial name
- Lumaria petrophora (Meyrick, 1938)

Synonyms
- Capua petrophora Meyrick, 1938

Species of moth

Lumaria petrophora is a species of moth of the family Tortricidae. It is found in the Democratic Republic of Congo and Tanzania.
