= Protogynanisa athletoides =

Scientific classification
- Domain: Eukaryota
- Kingdom: Animalia
- Phylum: Arthropoda
- Class: Insecta
- Order: Lepidoptera
- Family: Saturniidae
- Genus: Protogynanisa
- Species: P. athletoides

Binomial name
- Protogynanisa athletoides Rougeot, 1971

Species of moth

Protogynanisa athletoides is a species of moth in the family Saturniidae. It was described by Rougeot in 1971. It is found in Tanzania and Malawi.
