= Lumaria imperita =

Scientific classification
- Kingdom: Animalia
- Phylum: Arthropoda
- Class: Insecta
- Order: Lepidoptera
- Family: Tortricidae
- Genus: Lumaria
- Species: L. imperita

Binomial name
- Lumaria imperita (Meyrick in Caradja & Meyrick, 1937)

Synonyms
- Tortrix imperita Meyrick in Caradja & Meyrick, 1937

Species of moth

Lumaria imperita is a species of moth of the family Tortricidae. It is found in Yunnan, China.
