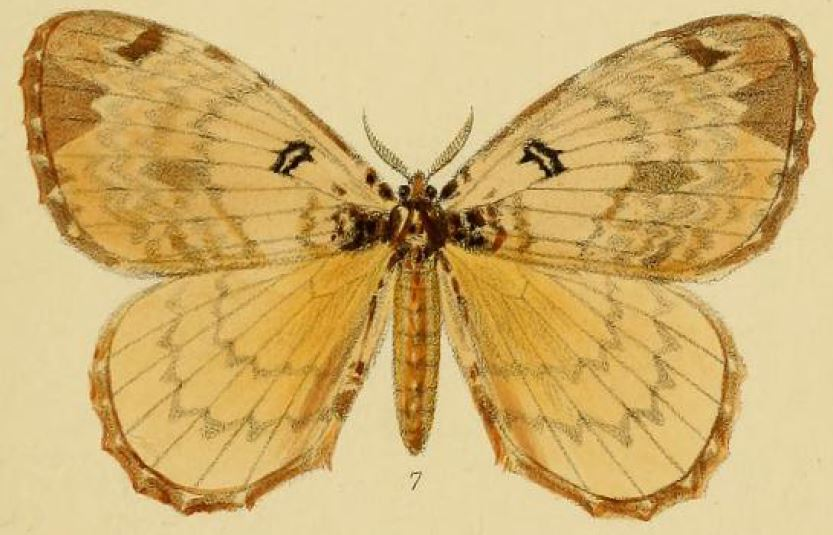

Scientific classification
- Kingdom: Animalia
- Phylum: Arthropoda
- Class: Insecta
- Order: Lepidoptera
- Family: Eupterotidae
- Genus: Camerunia
- Species: C. orphne

Binomial name
- Camerunia orphne (Schaus, 1893)

Synonyms
- Homochroa orphne Schaus, 1893; Camerunia insignis Aurivillius, 1893

= Camerunia orphne =

Species of moth

Camerunia orphne is a moth of the family Eupterotidae first described by William Schaus in 1893. It is found in Cameroon, Gabon and Sierra Leone.
