= Litosphingia minettii =

Scientific classification
- Kingdom: Animalia
- Phylum: Arthropoda
- Clade: Pancrustacea
- Class: Insecta
- Order: Lepidoptera
- Family: Sphingidae
- Genus: Litosphingia
- Species: L. minettii

Binomial name
- Litosphingia minettii Cadiou, 2000

Species of moth

Litosphingia minettii is a moth of the family Sphingidae. It is known from Malawi and Tanzania.
