= Pseudonaclia puella =

Scientific classification
- Kingdom: Animalia
- Phylum: Arthropoda
- Clade: Pancrustacea
- Class: Insecta
- Order: Lepidoptera
- Superfamily: Noctuoidea
- Family: Erebidae
- Subfamily: Arctiinae
- Genus: Pseudonaclia
- Species: P. puella

Binomial name
- Pseudonaclia puella (Boisduval, 1847)

Synonyms
- Naclia puella Boisduval, 1847; Pseudonaclia puella minor Rothschild, 1910

Species of moth

Pseudonaclia puella is a moth in the subfamily Arctiinae. It was described by Jean Baptiste Boisduval in 1847. It is found in Kenya, Mozambique, South Africa, Zambia and Zimbabwe.
