= Camerunia flava =

Scientific classification
- Kingdom: Animalia
- Phylum: Arthropoda
- Class: Insecta
- Order: Lepidoptera
- Family: Eupterotidae
- Genus: Camerunia
- Species: C. flava

Binomial name
- Camerunia flava Aurivillius, 1904

Synonyms
- Camerunia lactiflora Wichgraf, 1914

Species of moth

Camerunia flava is a moth of the family Eupterotidae first described by Per Olof Christopher Aurivillius in 1904. It is found in the Democratic Republic of the Congo, Malawi and Zambia.
