= Protogynanisa =

Scientific classification
- Domain: Eukaryota
- Kingdom: Animalia
- Phylum: Arthropoda
- Class: Insecta
- Order: Lepidoptera
- Family: Saturniidae
- Subfamily: Saturniinae
- Tribe: Bunaeini
- Genus: Protogynanisa; Rougeot, 1971

Genus of moths

Protogynanisa is a genus of moths in the family Saturniidae first described by Rougeot in 1971.

== Species ==
- Protogynanisa athletoides Rougeot, 1971
- Protogynanisa probsti Bouyer, 2001
