= Paralebedella schultzei =

Scientific classification
- Kingdom: Animalia
- Phylum: Arthropoda
- Clade: Pancrustacea
- Class: Insecta
- Order: Lepidoptera
- Family: Cossidae
- Genus: Paralebedella
- Species: P. schultzei

Binomial name
- Paralebedella schultzei (Aurivillius, 1905)

Synonyms
- Lebedodes schultzei Aurivillius, 1905

Species of moth

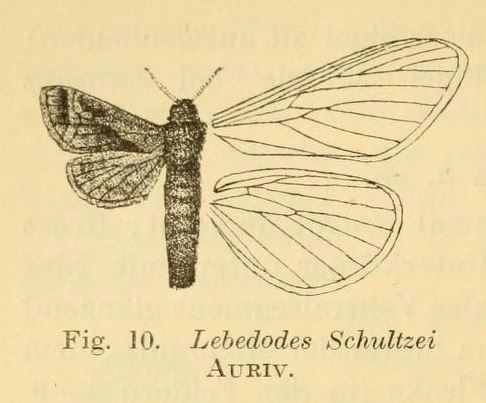
Paralebedella schultzei

Paralebedella schultzei is a moth in the family Cossidae. It is found in the Democratic Republic of Congo, Niger and Sierra Leone.

This species has a wingspan of 27mm.
