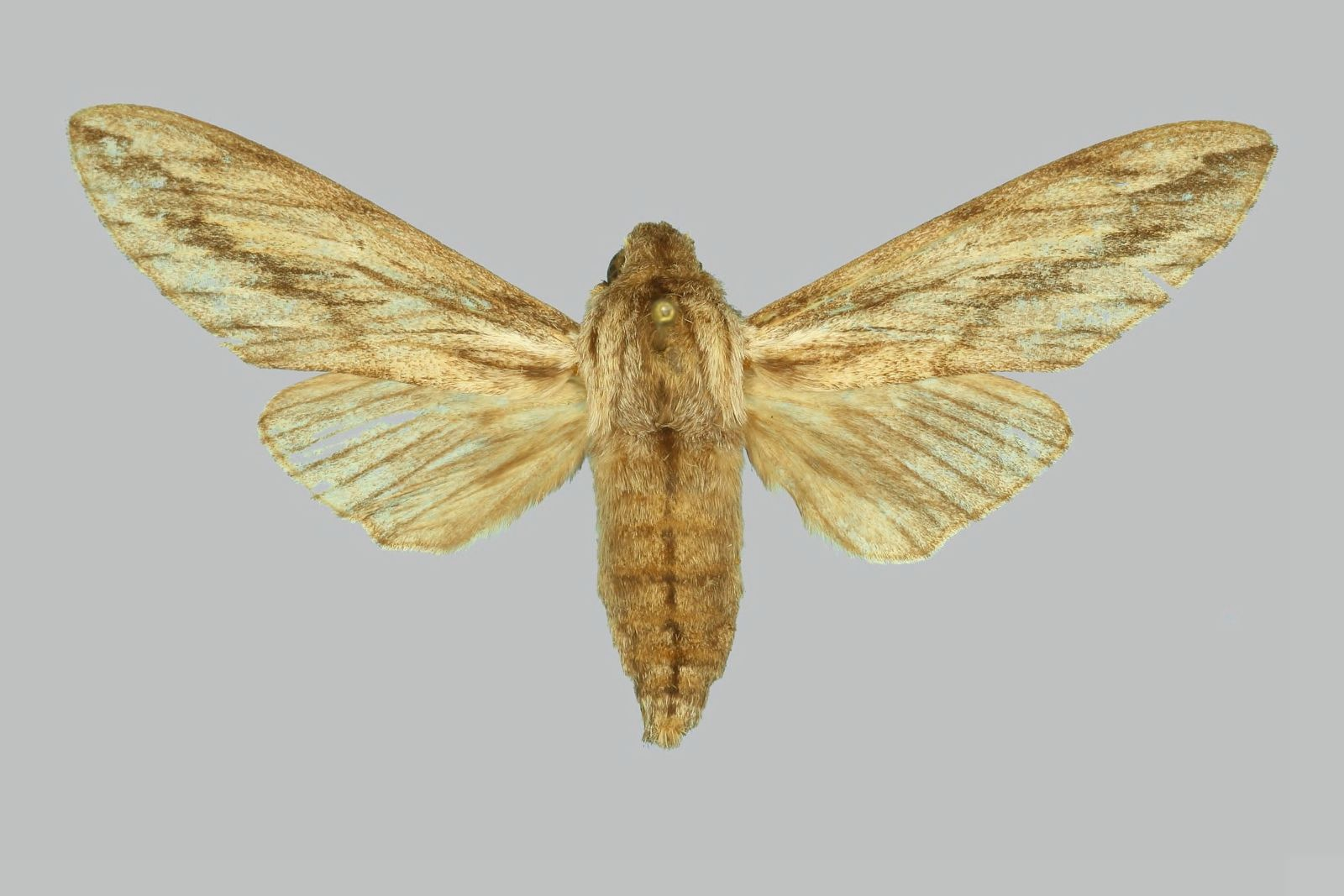
- Litosphingia corticea

Scientific classification
- Domain: Eukaryota
- Kingdom: Animalia
- Phylum: Arthropoda
- Class: Insecta
- Order: Lepidoptera
- Family: Sphingidae
- Tribe: Sphingini
- Genus: Litosphingia; Jordan, 1920

= Litosphingia =

Genus of moths

Litosphingia is a genus of moths in the family Sphingidae erected by Karl Jordan in 1920.

== Species ==
- Litosphingia corticea Jordan 1920
- Litosphingia minettii Cadiou, 2000
