= Inferuncus pentheres =

Scientific classification
- Kingdom: Animalia
- Phylum: Arthropoda
- Clade: Pancrustacea
- Class: Insecta
- Order: Lepidoptera
- Family: Pterophoridae
- Genus: Inferuncus
- Species: I. pentheres

Binomial name
- Inferuncus pentheres (Bigot, 1969)

Synonyms
- Platyptilia pentheres Bigot, 1969

Species of plume moth

Inferuncus pentheres is a moth of the family Pterophoridae that is known from the Democratic Republic of Congo and Tanzania.
