= Protinopalpa =

Scientific classification
- Domain: Eukaryota
- Kingdom: Animalia
- Phylum: Arthropoda
- Class: Insecta
- Order: Lepidoptera
- Family: Crambidae
- Subfamily: Pyraustinae
- Genus: Protinopalpa; Strand, 1911

Synonyms
- Protinopalpella Strand, 1911

Genus of moths

Protinopalpa is a genus of moths of the family Crambidae.

== Species ==
- Protinopalpa ferreoflava Strand, 1911
- Protinopalpa subclathrata Strand, 1911
