= Lumaria zeteotoma =

Scientific classification
- Kingdom: Animalia
- Phylum: Arthropoda
- Class: Insecta
- Order: Lepidoptera
- Family: Tortricidae
- Genus: Lumaria
- Species: L. zeteotoma

Binomial name
- Lumaria zeteotoma Razowski, 1984

Species of moth

Lumaria zeteotoma is a species of moth of the family Tortricidae. It is found in Yunnan, China.
