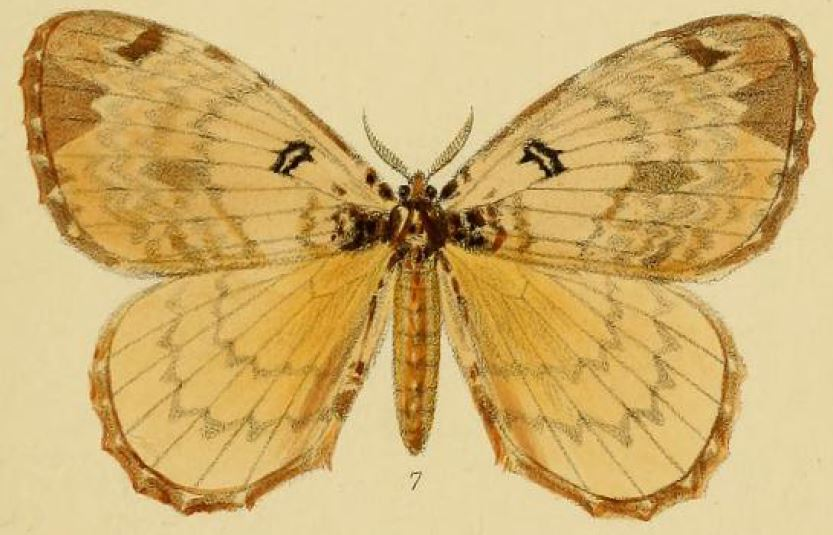
- Camerunia orphne

Scientific classification
- Kingdom: Animalia
- Phylum: Arthropoda
- Class: Insecta
- Order: Lepidoptera
- Family: Eupterotidae
- Subfamily: Janinae
- Genus: Camerunia; Aurivillius, 1893

= Camerunia =

Genus of moths

Camerunia is a genus of moths in the family Eupterotidae from Africa. The genus was erected by Per Olof Christopher Aurivillius in 1893.

== Species ==
- Camerunia albida Aurivillius, 1901
- Camerunia flava Aurivillius, 1904
- Camerunia orphne (Schaus, 1893)
