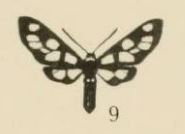

Scientific classification
- Kingdom: Animalia
- Phylum: Arthropoda
- Class: Insecta
- Order: Lepidoptera
- Superfamily: Noctuoidea
- Family: Erebidae
- Subfamily: Arctiinae
- Genus: Amata
- Species: A. monticola

Binomial name
- Amata monticola (Aurivillius, 1910)

Synonyms
- Syntomis monticola Aurivillius, 1910

= Amata monticola =

Species of moth

Amata monticola is a species of moth of the family Erebidae first described by Per Olof Christopher Aurivillius in 1910. It is found in Tanzania.

== Related pages ==
- List of moths of Tanzania
