= Aphilopota =

Scientific classification
- Kingdom: Animalia
- Phylum: Arthropoda
- Class: Insecta
- Order: Lepidoptera
- Family: Geometridae
- Tribe: Nacophorini
- Genus: Aphilopota; Warren, 1899

Type species
- Aphilopota interpellans (Butler, 1875)

Synonyms
- Haggardia Warren, 1904

Genus of geometer moths

Aphilopota is a genus of moths in the family Geometridae described by Warren in 1899.

== Species ==
Some species of this genus are:

- Aphilopota alloeomorpha Prout, 1938
- Aphilopota aspera Prout, 1938
- Aphilopota calaria (C. Swinhoe, 1904)
- Aphilopota cardinalli Prout, 1954
- Aphilopota confusata (Warren, 1902)
- Aphilopota conturbata (Walker, 1863)
- Aphilopota cydno Prout, 1954
- Aphilopota decepta Janse, 1932
- Aphilopota dicampsis Prout, 1934
- Aphilopota euodia Prout, 1954
- Aphilopota exterritorialis (Strand, 1909)
- Aphilopota fletcheriana Viette, 1975
- Aphilopota immatura Prout, 1938
- Aphilopota foedata (Bastelberger, 1907)
- Aphilopota inspersaria (Guenée, 1858)
- Aphilopota interpellans (Butler, 1875)
- Aphilopota iphia Prout, 1954
- Aphilopota mailaria (C. Swinhoe, 1904)
- Aphilopota melanommata Prout, 1954
- Aphilopota melanostigma (Warren, 1904)
- Aphilopota nubilata Prout, 1954
- Aphilopota ochrimacula (Warren, 1902)
- Aphilopota otoessa Prout, 1954
- Aphilopota patulata (Walker, 1863)
- Aphilopota perscotia Prout, 1931
- Aphilopota phanerostigma Prout, 1917
- Aphilopota plethora Prout, 1938
- Aphilopota reducta Viette, 1973
- Aphilopota rubidivenis (Prout, 1922)
- Aphilopota rufiplaga (Warren, 1902)
- Aphilopota scapularia (Snellen, 1872)
- Aphilopota semidentata Prout, 1931
- Aphilopota semiusta (Distant, 1898)
- Aphilopota sinistra Prout, 1954
- Aphilopota subalbata (Warren, 1905)
- Aphilopota seyrigi Viette, 1973
- Aphilopota sinistra Prout, 1954
- Aphilopota statuta Prout, 1954
- Aphilopota strigosissima (Bastelberger, 1909)
- Aphilopota subalbata (Warren, 1905)
- Aphilopota symphronima Prout, 1954
- Aphilopota triphasia Prout, 1954
- Aphilopota vicaria (Walker, 1860)
- Aphilopota viriditincta (Warren, 1905)
