= Lumaria probolias =

Scientific classification
- Kingdom: Animalia
- Phylum: Arthropoda
- Class: Insecta
- Order: Lepidoptera
- Family: Tortricidae
- Genus: Lumaria
- Species: L. probolias

Binomial name
- Lumaria probolias (Meyrick, 1907)

Synonyms
- Epagoge probolias Meyrick, 1907; Capua exalbescens Meyrick, 1922

Species of moth

Lumaria probolias is a species of moth of the family Tortricidae. It is found in India, Sri Lanka, Vietnam and Indonesia, including Java.
