= Megalonycta mediovitta =

Scientific classification
- Kingdom: Animalia
- Phylum: Arthropoda
- Clade: Pancrustacea
- Class: Insecta
- Order: Lepidoptera
- Superfamily: Noctuoidea
- Family: Noctuidae
- Genus: Megalonycta
- Species: M. mediovitta

Binomial name
- Megalonycta mediovitta (Rothschild, 1924)

Synonyms
- Acronycta mediovitta Rothschild, 1924; Thalatha waterloti Boursin, 1928

Species of moth

Megalonycta mediovitta is a moth of the family Noctuidae first described by Walter Rothschild in 1924. The species is found in Madagascar, the Comoros and Réunion.
