= Inferuncus infesta =

Scientific classification
- Kingdom: Animalia
- Phylum: Arthropoda
- Class: Insecta
- Order: Lepidoptera
- Family: Pterophoridae
- Genus: Inferuncus
- Species: I. infesta

Binomial name
- Inferuncus infesta (Meyrick, 1934)

Synonyms
- Platyptilia infesta Meyrick, 1934

Species of plume moth

Inferuncus infesta is a moth of the family Pterophoridae. The species was first described by Edward Meyrick in 1934 as Platyptilia infesta. It occurs on São Tomé Island off the western equatorial coast of Central Africa. It was placed in the genus Inferuncus in 2011.
