= Pseudoludia nyungwe =

Scientific classification
- Kingdom: Animalia
- Phylum: Arthropoda
- Class: Insecta
- Order: Lepidoptera
- Family: Saturniidae
- Genus: Pseudoludia
- Species: P. nyungwe

Binomial name
- Pseudoludia nyungwe Bouyer, 1988

Species of moth

Pseudoludia nyungwe is a species of moth in the family Saturniidae. It was described by Thierry Bouyer in 1988. It is found in Rwanda.
