= Lumaria =

Scientific classification
- Domain: Eukaryota
- Kingdom: Animalia
- Phylum: Arthropoda
- Class: Insecta
- Order: Lepidoptera
- Family: Tortricidae
- Tribe: Archipini
- Genus: Lumaria; Diakonoff, 1976

Genus of tortrix moths

Lumaria is a genus of moths belonging to the subfamily Tortricinae of the family Tortricidae.

== Species ==
- Lumaria afrotropica Razowski, 2002
- Lumaria imperita (Meyrick in Caradja & Meyrick, 1937)
- Lumaria lotsunica Razowski, 2006
- Lumaria petrophora (Meyrick, 1938)
- Lumaria probolias (Meyrick, 1907)
- Lumaria pusillana (Walker, 1863)
- Lumaria rhythmologa (Meyrick in Caradja & Meyrick, 1937)
- Lumaria zeteotoma Razowski, 1984
- Lumaria zeugmatovalva Razowski, 1984
- Lumaria zorotypa Razowski, 1984

== See also ==
- List of Tortricidae genera
