= Megalota vera =

Scientific classification
- Kingdom: Animalia
- Phylum: Arthropoda
- Class: Insecta
- Order: Lepidoptera
- Family: Tortricidae
- Genus: Megalota
- Species: M. vera

Binomial name
- Megalota vera Diakonoff, 1966

Species of moth

Megalota vera is a moth of the family Tortricidae. It is found in Thailand, New Guinea, the Bismarck Islands, Bali, the Moluccas and Australia (northern Queensland).
