= Aphilopota phanerostigma =

Scientific classification
- Kingdom: Animalia
- Phylum: Arthropoda
- Clade: Pancrustacea
- Class: Insecta
- Order: Lepidoptera
- Family: Geometridae
- Genus: Aphilopota
- Species: A. phanerostigma

Binomial name
- Aphilopota phanerostigma Prout, 1917

Species of moth

Aphilopota phanerostigma is a species of moth of the family Geometridae first described by Louis Beethoven Prout in 1917. It is found in the Democratic Republic of the Congo, South Africa, Zimbabwe and Ethiopia.

In Ethiopia the larvae of this species has been recorded as feeding on leaves of Catha edulis (Celastraceae).

== Subspecies ==
- Aphilopota phanerostigma phanerostigma Prout, 1917 (South Africa)
- Aphilopota phanerostigma mweruana Prout, 1954 (Congo)
