= Megalonycta =

Scientific classification
- Domain: Eukaryota
- Kingdom: Animalia
- Phylum: Arthropoda
- Class: Insecta
- Order: Lepidoptera
- Superfamily: Noctuoidea
- Family: Noctuidae
- Subfamily: Amphipyrinae
- Genus: Megalonycta; Viette, 1965

Genus of moths

Megalonycta is a genus of moths of the family Noctuidae. The genus was erected by Pierre Viette in 1965.

== Species ==
- Megalonycta mediovitta (Rothschild, 1924) Madagascar, Comoros
- Megalonycta adelphica (A. E. Prout, 1927) São Tomé
- Megalonycta forsteri Laporte, 1979 Ethiopia, Kenya, Tanzania
- Megalonycta kissa Bippus, 2020 from Reunion
- Megalonycta inversa (Gaede, 1915) Tanzania
- Megalonycta paragrapha (Felder & Rogenhofer, 1874) South Africa, Zimbabwe, Tanzania
