= Paralebedella shimonii =

Scientific classification
- Domain: Eukaryota
- Kingdom: Animalia
- Phylum: Arthropoda
- Class: Insecta
- Order: Lepidoptera
- Family: Cossidae
- Genus: Paralebedella
- Species: P. shimonii

Binomial name
- Paralebedella shimonii Lehmann, 2009

Species of moth

Paralebedella shimonii is a moth in the family Cossidae. It is found in Kenya. The habitat consists of legume-dominated coastal forests.

The length of the forewings is about 12.5 mm.

== Etymology ==
The species is named for Shimoni Lehmann, the son of the author.
