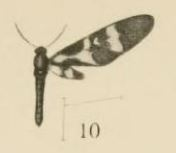

Scientific classification
- Domain: Eukaryota
- Kingdom: Animalia
- Phylum: Arthropoda
- Class: Insecta
- Order: Lepidoptera
- Superfamily: Noctuoidea
- Family: Erebidae
- Subfamily: Arctiinae
- Genus: Pseudonaclia; Butler, 1876

= Pseudonaclia =

Genus of moths

Pseudonaclia is a genus of moths in the subfamily Arctiinae. The genus was erected by Arthur Gardiner Butler in 1876.

== Species ==
- Pseudonaclia bifasciata Aurivillius, 1909
- Pseudonaclia fasciata Gaede, 1926
- Pseudonaclia puella Boisduval, 1847
