= Megalota fallax =

Scientific classification
- Kingdom: Animalia
- Phylum: Arthropoda
- Class: Insecta
- Order: Lepidoptera
- Family: Tortricidae
- Genus: Megalota
- Species: M. fallax

Binomial name
- Megalota fallax (Meyrick, 1909)

Synonyms
- Polychrosis fallax Meyrick, 1909; Lobesia fallax Clarke, 1958; Megalota fallax Diakonoff, 1966

Species of moth

Megalota fallax is a moth of the family Tortricidae first described by Edward Meyrick in 1909. It is found in Thailand, India, Sri Lanka and Laos.
