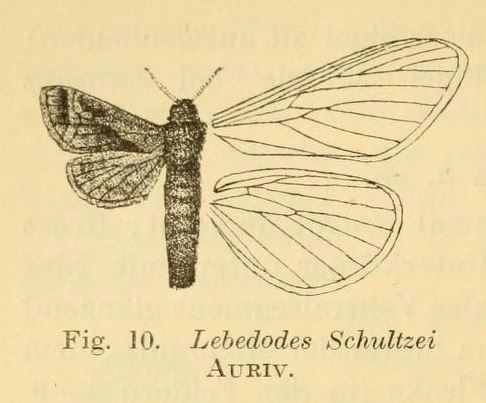
- Paralebedella schultzei

Scientific classification
- Domain: Eukaryota
- Kingdom: Animalia
- Phylum: Arthropoda
- Class: Insecta
- Order: Lepidoptera
- Family: Cossidae
- Subfamily: Metarbelinae
- Genus: Paralebedella; Strand, 1923

Synonyms
- Paralebeda Hampson, 1910

= Paralebedella =

Genus of moths

Paralebedella is a genus of moths in the family Cossidae.

== Species ==
- Paralebedella carnescens Hampson, 1910
- Paralebedella estherae Lehmann, 2008
- Paralebedella schultzei (Aurivillius, 1905)
- Paralebedella shimonii Lehmann, 2009
