= Paralebedella carnescens =

Scientific classification
- Kingdom: Animalia
- Phylum: Arthropoda
- Clade: Pancrustacea
- Class: Insecta
- Order: Lepidoptera
- Family: Cossidae
- Genus: Paralebedella
- Species: P. carnescens

Binomial name
- Paralebedella carnescens (Hampson, 1910)

Synonyms
- Paralebeda carnescens Hampson, 1910

Species of moth

Paralebedella carnescens is a moth in the family Cossidae. It is found in South Africa.
