= Pseudoludia =

Scientific classification
- Kingdom: Animalia
- Phylum: Arthropoda
- Class: Insecta
- Order: Lepidoptera
- Family: Saturniidae
- Subfamily: Saturniinae
- Genus: Pseudoludia; Strand, 1911

Genus of moths

Pseudoludia is a genus of moths in the family Saturniidae first described by Strand in 1911.

== Species ==
- Pseudoludia nyungwe Bouyer, 1988
- Pseudoludia suavis (Rothschild, 1907)
