= Sambara (moth) =

Scientific classification
- Domain: Eukaryota
- Kingdom: Animalia
- Phylum: Arthropoda
- Class: Insecta
- Order: Lepidoptera
- Family: Tortricidae
- Subfamily: Olethreutinae
- Genus: Sambara; Aarvik, 2004

Genus of tortrix moths

Sambara is a genus of moths in the family Tortricidae. The genus was erected by Leif Aarvik in 2004.

== Species ==
- Sambara sinuana Aarvik, 2004
- Sambara sciara Razowski, 2012
