= Scopula umbratilinea =

Scientific classification
- Kingdom: Animalia
- Phylum: Arthropoda
- Class: Insecta
- Order: Lepidoptera
- Family: Geometridae
- Genus: Scopula
- Species: S. umbratilinea

Binomial name
- Scopula umbratilinea (Warren, 1901)

Synonyms
- Craspedia umbratilinea Warren, 1901

Species of geometer moth in subfamily Sterrhinae

Scopula umbratilinea is a moth of the family Geometridae. It is found in Tanzania.
