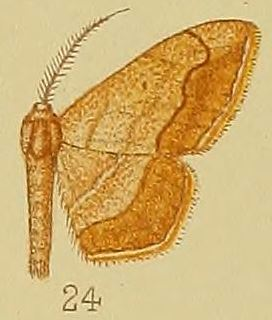

Scientific classification
- Domain: Eukaryota
- Kingdom: Animalia
- Phylum: Arthropoda
- Class: Insecta
- Order: Lepidoptera
- Family: Geometridae
- Genus: Scopula
- Species: S. curvimargo

Binomial name
- Scopula curvimargo (Warren, 1900)

Synonyms
- Induna curvimargo Warren, 1900; Psilephyra bilineata Bastelberger, 1909; Induna nubicincta Hampson, 1910

= Scopula curvimargo =

Species of geometer moth in subfamily Sterrhinae

Scopula curvimargo is a moth of the family Geometridae. It is found in Kenya, South Africa, Tanzania, Zambia and Zimbabwe.
