= Eilema peperita =

Scientific classification
- Kingdom: Animalia
- Phylum: Arthropoda
- Class: Insecta
- Order: Lepidoptera
- Superfamily: Noctuoidea
- Family: Erebidae
- Subfamily: Arctiinae
- Genus: Eilema
- Species: E. peperita

Binomial name
- Eilema peperita (Hampson, 1901)

Synonyms
- Ilema peperita Hampson, 1901; Eilema montana Aurivillius, 1910; Aroterosia peperita (Hampson, 1901)

Species of moth

Eilema peperita is a moth of the subfamily Arctiinae. It was described by George Hampson in 1901. It is found in the Democratic Republic of the Congo, Kenya and Tanzania.
