= Phyllonorycter aarviki =

Scientific classification
- Kingdom: Animalia
- Phylum: Arthropoda
- Class: Insecta
- Order: Lepidoptera
- Family: Gracillariidae
- Genus: Phyllonorycter
- Species: P. aarviki

Binomial name
- Phyllonorycter aarviki de Prins, 2012

Species of moth

Phyllonorycter aarviki is a moth of the family Gracillariidae. It is found in Tanzania and Yemen. The habitat consists of dry semi urbanized areas along the Indian coast and in eastern Africa.
