= Scopula agrapta =

Scientific classification
- Domain: Eukaryota
- Kingdom: Animalia
- Phylum: Arthropoda
- Class: Insecta
- Order: Lepidoptera
- Family: Geometridae
- Genus: Scopula
- Species: S. agrapta

Binomial name
- Scopula agrapta (Warren, 1902)

Synonyms
- Craspedia agrapta Warren, 1902

Species of geometer moth in subfamily Sterrhinae

Scopula agrapta is a moth of the family Geometridae. It was described by Warren in 1902. It is found in Kenya, South Africa, Tanzania and Uganda.
