= Lumaria pusillana =

Scientific classification
- Kingdom: Animalia
- Phylum: Arthropoda
- Class: Insecta
- Order: Lepidoptera
- Family: Tortricidae
- Genus: Lumaria
- Species: L. pusillana

Binomial name
- Lumaria pusillana (Walker, 1863)

Synonyms
- Tortrix pusillana Walker, 1863; Capua pusillana

Species of moth

Lumaria pusillana is a species of moth of the family Tortricidae first described by Francis Walker in 1863. It is found in Japan, India, Indonesia (Java, Bali), Sri Lanka, Malawi, Tanzania and Uganda.

The larvae are thought to be polyphagous.
