= Inferuncus stoltzei =

Scientific classification
- Kingdom: Animalia
- Phylum: Arthropoda
- Class: Insecta
- Order: Lepidoptera
- Family: Pterophoridae
- Genus: Inferuncus
- Species: I. stoltzei

Binomial name
- Inferuncus stoltzei (Gielis, 1990)

Synonyms
- Amblyptilia stoltzei Gielis, 1990

Species of plume moth

Inferuncus stoltzei is a moth of the family Pterophoridae that is known from Tanzania.
