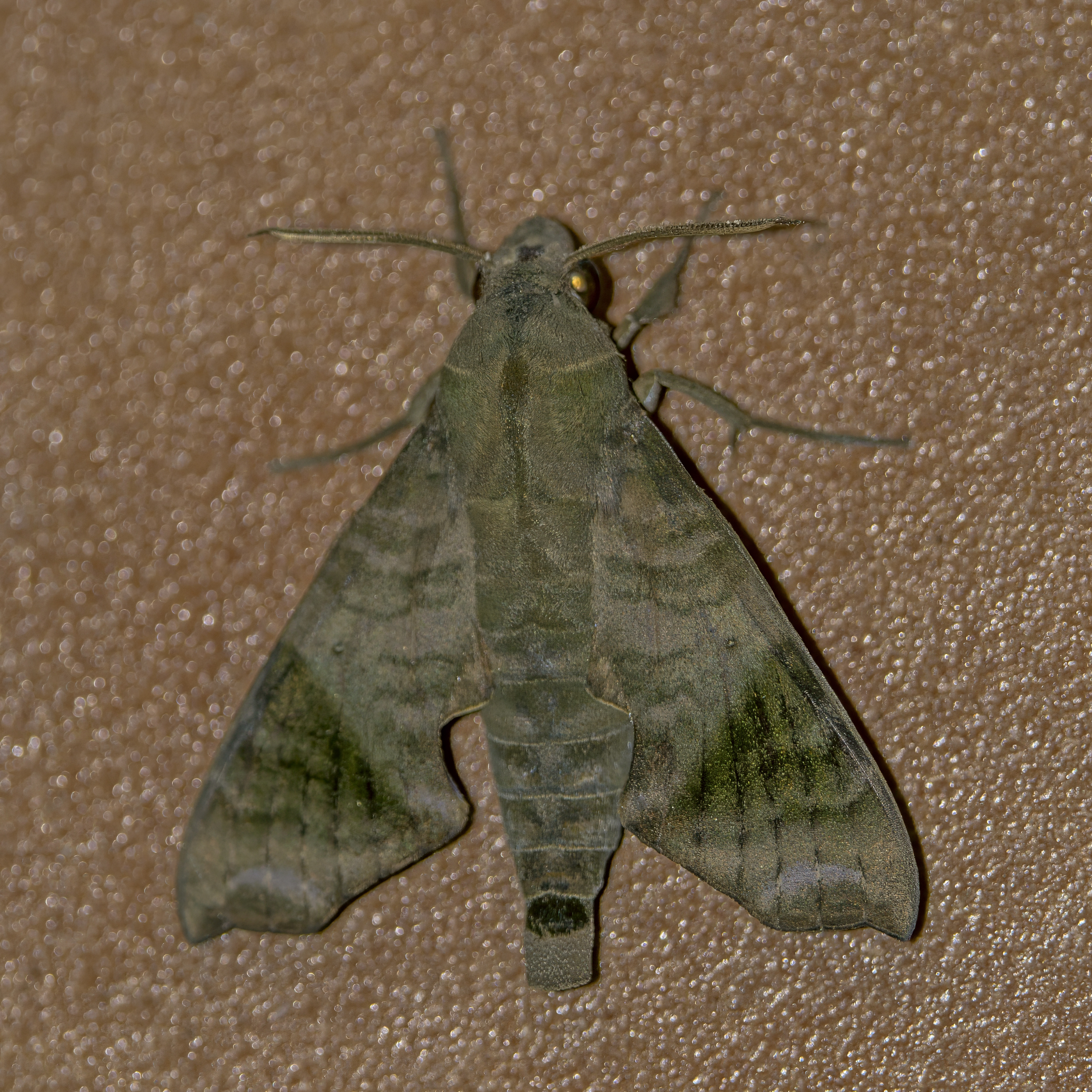
- T. s. sardanus, Ghana

Scientific classification
- Kingdom: Animalia
- Phylum: Arthropoda
- Class: Insecta
- Order: Lepidoptera
- Family: Sphingidae
- Genus: Temnora
- Species: T. sardanus

Binomial name
- Temnora sardanus (Walker, 1856)

Synonyms
- Enyo sardanus Walker, 1856; Diodosida uniformis Rothschild, 1894

= Temnora sardanus =

Species of moth

Temnora sardanus is a moth of the family Sphingidae. It is known from forests and heavy woodland from Sierra Leone to Congo and Angola, then to Zimbabwe and East Africa.

The length of the forewings is 19–21 mm for males and 23–25 mm for females.

== Subspecies ==
- Temnora sardanus sardanus
- Temnora sardanus canui Darge, 1991 (São Tomé & Princípe)
- Temnora sardanus hirsutus Darge, 2004 (Tanzania)
