= Aphilopota foedata =

Scientific classification
- Kingdom: Animalia
- Phylum: Arthropoda
- Class: Insecta
- Order: Lepidoptera
- Family: Geometridae
- Genus: Aphilopota
- Species: A. foedata

Binomial name
- Aphilopota foedata (Bastelberger, 1907)

Synonyms
- Dyscia foedata Bastelberger, 1907

Species of moth

Aphilopota foedata is a species of moth of the family Geometridae first described by Max Bastelberger in 1907. It is found in Tanzania.

This species looks dirty yellowish grey, irregularly sprayed with fine black spots on the forewings and hindwings. The male has a wingspan of 40–41 mm.
