= Sambara sinuana =

Scientific classification
- Domain: Eukaryota
- Kingdom: Animalia
- Phylum: Arthropoda
- Class: Insecta
- Order: Lepidoptera
- Family: Tortricidae
- Genus: Sambara
- Species: S. sinuana

Binomial name
- Sambara sinuana Aarvik, 2004

Species of tortrix moth

Sambara sinuana is a moth in the family Tortricidae first described by Leif Aarvik in 2004. It is found in Tanzania.
