= Scopula argentidisca =

Scientific classification
- Domain: Eukaryota
- Kingdom: Animalia
- Phylum: Arthropoda
- Class: Insecta
- Order: Lepidoptera
- Family: Geometridae
- Genus: Scopula
- Species: S. argentidisca

Binomial name
- Scopula argentidisca (Warren, 1902)

Synonyms
- Craspedia argentidisca Warren, 1902; Craspedia naias Warren, 1903

Species of geometer moth in subfamily Sterrhinae

Scopula argentidisca is a moth of the family Geometridae. It was described by Warren in 1902. It is found in Kenya, Tanzania and Zambia.
