= Dichomeris chalybitis =

Scientific classification
- Kingdom: Animalia
- Phylum: Arthropoda
- Class: Insecta
- Order: Lepidoptera
- Family: Gelechiidae
- Genus: Dichomeris
- Species: D. chalybitis

Binomial name
- Dichomeris chalybitis (Meyrick, 1920)

Synonyms
- Deimnestra chalybitis Meyrick, 1920; Trichotaphe chalybitis

Species of moth

Dichomeris chalybitis is a moth in the family Gelechiidae. It was described by Edward Meyrick in 1920. It is found in Tanzania.
