= Protogynanisa probsti =

Scientific classification
- Kingdom: Animalia
- Phylum: Arthropoda
- Class: Insecta
- Order: Lepidoptera
- Family: Saturniidae
- Genus: Protogynanisa
- Species: P. probsti

Binomial name
- Protogynanisa probsti Bouyer, 2001

Species of moth

Protogynanisa probsti is a species of moth in the family Saturniidae. It was described by Thierry Bouyer in 2001. It is found in Tanzania and Kenya.
