= Megalonycta forsteri =

Scientific classification
- Kingdom: Animalia
- Phylum: Arthropoda
- Class: Insecta
- Order: Lepidoptera
- Superfamily: Noctuoidea
- Family: Noctuidae
- Genus: Megalonycta
- Species: M. forsteri

Binomial name
- Megalonycta forsteri Laporte, 1979

Species of moth

Megalonycta forsteri is a moth of the family Noctuidae first described by Bernard Laporte in 1979. The species is found in Ethiopia, Kenya and Tanzania.

This species has a wingspan from 36 mm and a length of the forewings of 16 mm.
