= Protinopalpa subclathrata =

Scientific classification
- Kingdom: Animalia
- Phylum: Arthropoda
- Class: Insecta
- Order: Lepidoptera
- Family: Crambidae
- Genus: Protinopalpa
- Species: P. subclathrata

Binomial name
- Protinopalpa subclathrata Strand, 1911

Species of moth

Protinopalpa subclathrata is a moth in the family Crambidae. It was described by Strand in 1911. It is found in Tanzania.
