= Scopula roseocincta =

Scientific classification
- Kingdom: Animalia
- Phylum: Arthropoda
- Class: Insecta
- Order: Lepidoptera
- Family: Geometridae
- Genus: Scopula
- Species: S. roseocincta

Binomial name
- Scopula roseocincta (Warren, 1899)

Synonyms
- Eois roseocincta Warren, 1899; Zygophyxia roseocincta

Species of geometer moth in subfamily Sterrhinae

Scopula roseocincta is a moth of the family Geometridae. It is found in South Africa and Tanzania.
