= Eupithecia undiculata =

Scientific classification
- Kingdom: Animalia
- Phylum: Arthropoda
- Clade: Pancrustacea
- Class: Insecta
- Order: Lepidoptera
- Family: Geometridae
- Genus: Eupithecia
- Species: E. undiculata

Binomial name
- Eupithecia undiculata L. B. Prout, 1932

Synonyms
- Tephroclystia vermiculata Warren, 1901

Species of moth

Eupithecia undiculata is a moth in the family Geometridae. It is found in Kenya, South Africa, Tanzania, Uganda and Zimbabwe.

== Subspecies ==
- Eupithecia undiculata undiculata
- Eupithecia undiculata glaucata D. S. Fletcher, 1956
