= Merunympha =

Scientific classification
- Kingdom: Animalia
- Phylum: Arthropoda
- Clade: Pancrustacea
- Class: Insecta
- Order: Lepidoptera
- Family: Tineidae
- Subfamily: Myrmecozelinae
- Genus: Merunympha; Gozmány, 1969
- Species: M. nipha

Binomial name
- Merunympha nipha Gozmány, 1969

Genus of moths

Merunympha is a genus of moths belonging to the family Tineidae. It contains only one species, Merunympha nipha, which is found in Tanzania.
