= Schalidomitra =

Scientific classification
- Domain: Eukaryota
- Kingdom: Animalia
- Phylum: Arthropoda
- Class: Insecta
- Order: Lepidoptera
- Superfamily: Noctuoidea
- Family: Erebidae
- Subfamily: Calpinae
- Genus: Schalidomitra; Strand, 1911
- Species: S. ambages

Binomial name
- Schalidomitra ambages Strand, 1911

Genus of moths

Schalidomitra is a monotypic moth genus of the family Erebidae. Its only species, Schalidomitra ambages, is found in Botswana, Malawi, Mozambique, Tanzania and Zimbabwe. Both the genus and species were first described by Strand in 1911.
