= Geita bjoernstadi =

Scientific classification
- Kingdom: Animalia
- Phylum: Arthropoda
- Clade: Pancrustacea
- Class: Insecta
- Order: Lepidoptera
- Family: Tortricidae
- Genus: Geita
- Species: G. bjoernstadi

Binomial name
- Geita bjoernstadi Aarvik, 2004

Species of moth

Geita bjoernstadi is a species of moth of the family Tortricidae. It is found in the Democratic Republic of Congo and Tanzania.
