= Eupithecia tricuspis =

Scientific classification
- Kingdom: Animalia
- Phylum: Arthropoda
- Clade: Pancrustacea
- Class: Insecta
- Order: Lepidoptera
- Family: Geometridae
- Genus: Eupithecia
- Species: E. tricuspis

Binomial name
- Eupithecia tricuspis L. B. Prout, 1932

Synonyms
- Eupithecia gonypetes Prout, 1934

Species of moth

Eupithecia tricuspis is a moth in the family Geometridae. It is found in Uganda and possibly Tanzania.
