= Camerunia albida =

Scientific classification
- Kingdom: Animalia
- Phylum: Arthropoda
- Class: Insecta
- Order: Lepidoptera
- Family: Eupterotidae
- Genus: Camerunia
- Species: C. albida

Binomial name
- Camerunia albida Aurivillius, 1901

Species of moth

Camerunia albida is a moth of the family Eupterotidae first described by Per Olof Christopher Aurivillius in 1901. It is found in Tanzania.
