= Inferuncus =

Scientific classification
- Kingdom: Animalia
- Phylum: Arthropoda
- Clade: Pancrustacea
- Class: Insecta
- Order: Lepidoptera
- Family: Pterophoridae
- Subfamily: Pterophorinae
- Tribe: Platyptiliini
- Genus: Inferuncus; Gibeaux, 1994

Plume moth genus

Inferuncus is a genus of moths in the family Pterophoridae.

== Species ==
The following species are assigned to this genus:

- Inferuncus infesta (Meyrick, 1934)
- Inferuncus interpres (Meyrick, 1922)
- Inferuncus nigreus Gibeaux, 1994
- Inferuncus stoltzei Gielis, 1990
- Inferuncus strictiformis (Meyrick, 1932)
- Inferuncus toxochorda (Meyrick, 1934)
