= Syngeneta =

Scientific classification
- Kingdom: Animalia
- Phylum: Arthropoda
- Clade: Pancrustacea
- Class: Insecta
- Order: Lepidoptera
- Family: Tineidae
- Subfamily: Myrmecozelinae
- Genus: Syngeneta; Gozmány, 1967
- Species: S. sordida

Binomial name
- Syngeneta sordida Gozmány, 1967

Genus of moths

Syngeneta is a moth genus, belonging to the family Tineidae. It contains only one species, Syngeneta sordida, which is found in Tanzania.
