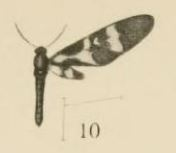

Scientific classification
- Kingdom: Animalia
- Phylum: Arthropoda
- Clade: Pancrustacea
- Class: Insecta
- Order: Lepidoptera
- Superfamily: Noctuoidea
- Family: Erebidae
- Subfamily: Arctiinae
- Genus: Pseudonaclia
- Species: P. bifasciata

Binomial name
- Pseudonaclia bifasciata Aurivillius, 1909

= Pseudonaclia bifasciata =

Species of moth

Pseudonaclia bifasciata is a moth in the subfamily Arctiinae. It was described by Per Olof Christopher Aurivillius in 1909 and is found in Kenya and Tanzania.
