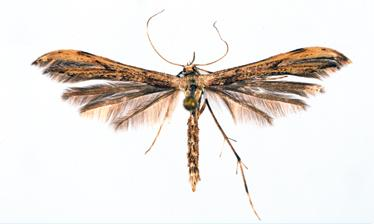

Scientific classification
- Kingdom: Animalia
- Phylum: Arthropoda
- Class: Insecta
- Order: Lepidoptera
- Family: Pterophoridae
- Genus: Hellinsia
- Species: H. emmelinoida

Binomial name
- Hellinsia emmelinoida Gielis, 2008

= Hellinsia emmelinoida =

Species of plume moth

Hellinsia emmelinoida is a moth of the family Pterophoroidea. It is found in Tanzania. The species closely resembles the European Emmelina monodactyla.

The wingspan is 22–24 mm. The moth flies in January, July and December.
