= Pseudoludia suavis =

Scientific classification
- Kingdom: Animalia
- Phylum: Arthropoda
- Class: Insecta
- Order: Lepidoptera
- Family: Saturniidae
- Genus: Pseudoludia
- Species: P. suavis

Binomial name
- Pseudoludia suavis (Rothschild, 1907)

Synonyms
- Holocera suavis Rothschild, 1907; Holocera lilacina Weymer, 1907

Species of moth

Pseudoludia suavis is a species of moth in the family Saturniidae. It was described by Rothschild in 1907. It is found in Tanzania and Malawi.
