= Megalota archana =

Scientific classification
- Kingdom: Animalia
- Phylum: Arthropoda
- Clade: Pancrustacea
- Class: Insecta
- Order: Lepidoptera
- Family: Tortricidae
- Genus: Megalota
- Species: M. archana

Binomial name
- Megalota archana Aarvik, 2004

Species of insect

Megalota archana is a species of moth of the family Tortricidae. It is found in Kenya, Nigeria, Tanzania and Uganda.
