= Phyllonorycter maererei =

Scientific classification
- Kingdom: Animalia
- Phylum: Arthropoda
- Class: Insecta
- Order: Lepidoptera
- Family: Gracillariidae
- Genus: Phyllonorycter
- Species: P. maererei

Binomial name
- Phyllonorycter maererei de Prins, 2012

Species of moth

Phyllonorycter maererei is a moth of the family Gracillariidae. It is found in Tanzania and Yemen in dry areas but with low green vegetation at altitudes between 500 and 1,000 meters.

The length of the forewings is 2.1 mm.

== Etymology ==
The species is named in honour of Professor Amon Petro Maerere of the Department of Crop Science and horticulture at the Sokoine University of Agriculture in Tanzania. He is the father of an entomologist and agronomist Peter Amon Maerere.
