= Amata rubritincta =

Scientific classification
- Kingdom: Animalia
- Phylum: Arthropoda
- Class: Insecta
- Order: Lepidoptera
- Superfamily: Noctuoidea
- Family: Erebidae
- Subfamily: Arctiinae
- Genus: Amata
- Species: A. rubritincta

Binomial name
- Amata rubritincta (Hampson, 1903)

Synonyms
- Syntomis rubritincta Hampson, 1903

Species of moth

Amata rubritincta is a moth of the family Erebidae. It was described by George Hampson in 1903. It is found in Kenya, Rwanda, Tanzania and Uganda.
