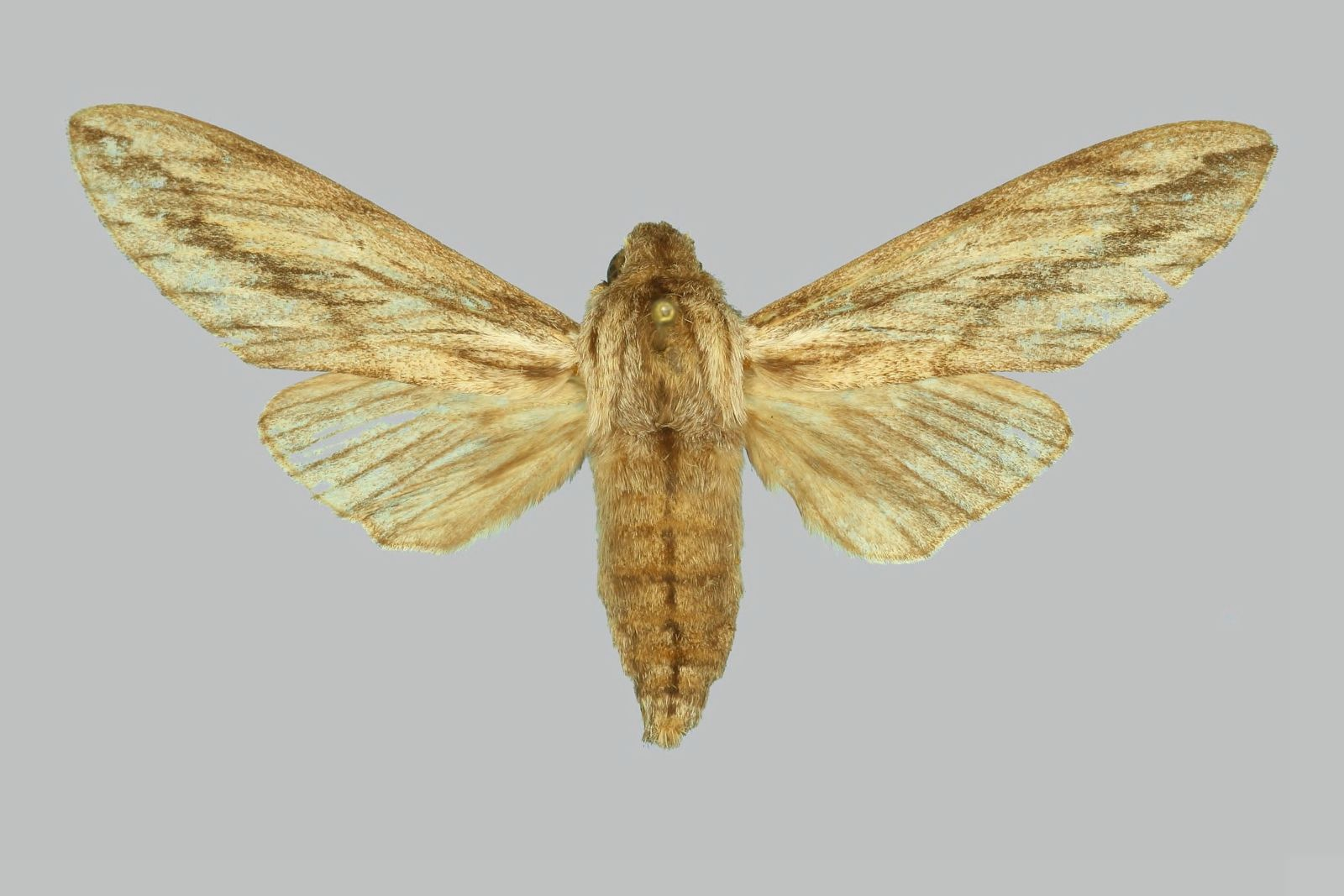

Scientific classification
- Domain: Eukaryota
- Kingdom: Animalia
- Phylum: Arthropoda
- Class: Insecta
- Order: Lepidoptera
- Family: Sphingidae
- Genus: Litosphingia
- Species: L. corticea

Binomial name
- Litosphingia corticea Jordan, 1920

= Litosphingia corticea =

Species of moth

Litosphingia corticea is a moth of the family Sphingidae. It is known from savanna and bush from Matabeleland to Tanzania.

The length of the forewings is about 22 mm for males and about 27 mm for females.
