= Phyllonorycter mwatawalai =

Scientific classification
- Kingdom: Animalia
- Phylum: Arthropoda
- Class: Insecta
- Order: Lepidoptera
- Family: Gracillariidae
- Genus: Phyllonorycter
- Species: P. mwatawalai

Binomial name
- Phyllonorycter mwatawalai de Prins, 2012

Species of moth

Phyllonorycter mwatawalai is a moth of the family Gracillariidae. It is found in the Morogoro area of Tanzania. The habitat consists of a degraded savannah-like, natural biotope rich in low-growing woody Acacia trees and bushes and thick low dry herbarious vegetation. The area was surrounded by cultivated agricultural areas (orchards and maize fields).

The length of the forewings is 1.7 mm.
