= Ceryx burtti =

Scientific classification
- Kingdom: Animalia
- Phylum: Arthropoda
- Class: Insecta
- Order: Lepidoptera
- Superfamily: Noctuoidea
- Family: Erebidae
- Subfamily: Arctiinae
- Genus: Ceryx
- Species: C. burtti

Binomial name
- Ceryx burtti (Distant, 1900)

Synonyms
- Syntomis burtti Distant, 1900; Trichaeta burtti – Hampson, 1914; Trichaeta burttii

Species of moth

Ceryx burtti is a moth of the subfamily Arctiinae. It was described by William Lucas Distant in 1900. It is known from Pemba Island, Tanzania.
