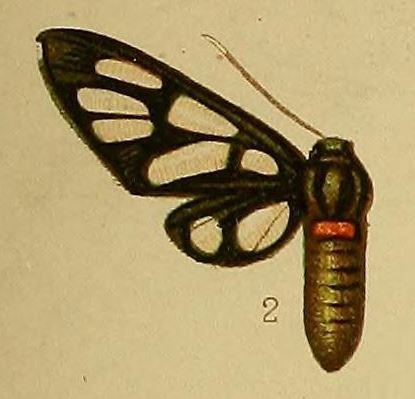

Scientific classification
- Kingdom: Animalia
- Phylum: Arthropoda
- Class: Insecta
- Order: Lepidoptera
- Superfamily: Noctuoidea
- Family: Erebidae
- Subfamily: Arctiinae
- Genus: Amata
- Species: A. miozona

Binomial name
- Amata miozona (Hampson, 1910)

Synonyms
- Syntomis miozona Hampson, 1910

= Amata miozona =

Species of moth

Amata miozona is a moth of the family Erebidae. It was described by George Hampson in 1910. It is found in the Democratic Republic of the Congo, Tanzania, Zambia and Zimbabwe.
