= Paralebedella estherae =

Scientific classification
- Domain: Eukaryota
- Kingdom: Animalia
- Phylum: Arthropoda
- Class: Insecta
- Order: Lepidoptera
- Family: Cossidae
- Genus: Paralebedella
- Species: P. estherae

Binomial name
- Paralebedella estherae Lehmann, 2008

Species of moth

Paralebedella estherae is a moth in the family Cossidae. It is found in Tanzania and Uganda. The habitat consists of submontane forests.

The length of the forewings is about 10.5 mm.

== Etymology ==
The species is named for Dr Esther Kioko.
