= Pseudonaclia fasciata =

Scientific classification
- Kingdom: Animalia
- Phylum: Arthropoda
- Clade: Pancrustacea
- Class: Insecta
- Order: Lepidoptera
- Superfamily: Noctuoidea
- Family: Erebidae
- Subfamily: Arctiinae
- Genus: Pseudonaclia
- Species: P. fasciata

Binomial name
- Pseudonaclia fasciata Gaede, 1926

Species of moth

Pseudonaclia fasciata is a moth in the subfamily Arctiinae. It was described by Max Gaede in 1926. It is found in Tanzania.
