= List of moths of Togo =

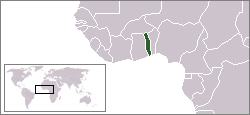
Location of Togo

The moths of Togo represent about 180 known moth species. The moths (mostly nocturnal) and butterflies (mostly diurnal) together make up the taxonomic order Lepidoptera.

This is a list of moth species which have been recorded in Togo.

== Anomoeotidae ==
- Anomoeotes tenellula Holland, 1893

== Arctiidae ==
- Afraloa bifurca (Walker, 1855)
- Afrasura obliterata (Walker, 1864)
- Afrowatsonius marginalis (Walker, 1855)
- Agylloides asurella Strand, 1912
- Alpenus maculosa (Stoll, 1781)
- Amata waldowi (Grünberg, 1907)
- Amerila brunnea (Hampson, 1901)
- Amerila luteibarba (Hampson, 1901)
- Amerila roseomarginata (Rothschild, 1910)
- Amphicallia pactolicus (Butler, 1888)
- Amsacta flavicostata (Gaede, 1916)
- Amsacta fuscosa (Bartel, 1903)
- Amsacta marginalis Walker, 1855
- Argina leonina (Walker, 1865)
- Asura craigii (Holland, 1893)
- Balacra rubrostriata (Aurivillius, 1892)
- Cragia distigmata (Hampson, 1901)
- Cyana delicata (Walker, 1854)
- Cyana togoana (Strand, 1912)
- Eilema cuneata Strand, 1912
- Eilema pulverosa Aurivillius, 1904
- Nanna eningae (Plötz, 1880)
- Nyctemera acraeina Druce, 1882
- Nyctemera apicalis (Walker, 1854)
- Nyctemera perspicua (Walker, 1854)
- Nyctemera togoensis (Strand, 1909)
- Nyctemera xanthura (Plötz, 1880)
- Pusiola hemiphaea (Hampson, 1909)
- Spilosoma karschi Bartel, 1903
- Spilosoma semihyalina Bartel, 1903
- Spilosoma togoensis Bartel, 1903
- Teracotona rhodophaea (Walker, 1865)
- Thyretes negus Oberthür, 1878
- Zobida trinitas (Strand, 1912)

== Cossidae ==
- Phragmataecia pelostema (Hering, 1923)

== Crambidae ==
- Protinopalpa ferreoflava Strand, 1911

== Drepanidae ==
- Gonoreta subtilis (Bryk, 1913)
- Uranometra oculata (Holland, 1893)

== Geometridae ==
- Disclisioprocta natalata (Walker, 1862)
- Ereunetea minor (Holland, 1893)
- Ereunetea minor (Holland, 1893)
- Idaea prionodonta (Prout, 1932)
- Zamarada bicuspida D. S. Fletcher, 1974
- Zamarada clementi Herbulot, 1975
- Zamarada corroborata Herbulot, 1954
- Zamarada crystallophana Mabille, 1900
- Zamarada cucharita D. S. Fletcher, 1974
- Zamarada dilucida Warren, 1909
- Zamarada emaciata D. S. Fletcher, 1974
- Zamarada euerces Prout, 1928
- Zamarada iobathra Prout, 1932
- Zamarada melpomene Oberthür, 1912
- Zamarada mimesis D. S. Fletcher, 1974
- Zamarada nasuta Warren, 1897
- Zamarada platycephala D. S. Fletcher, 1974
- Zamarada polyctemon Prout, 1932

== Lasiocampidae ==
- Eucraera minor (Gaede, 1915)
- Mimopacha similis Hering, 1935
- Morongea mastodont Zolotuhin & Prozorov, 2010
- Odontocheilopteryx maculata Aurivillius, 1905
- Pachyna subfascia (Walker, 1855)
- Pallastica lateritia (Hering, 1928)
- Pallastica phronema (Hering, 1928)
- Philotherma sordida Aurivillius, 1905
- Pseudolyra lineadentata (Bethune-Baker, 1911)
- Streblote misanum (Strand, 1912)

== Limacodidae ==
- Cosuma rugosa Walker, 1855
- Ctenolita anacompa Karsch, 1896
- Ctenolita epargyra Karsch, 1896
- Delorhachis nigrivenosa Karsch, 1896
- Delorhachis viridiplaga Karsch, 1896
- Halseyia albovenosa (Hering, 1928)
- Halseyia fimbriata (Karsch, 1896)
- Halseyia separata (Karsch, 1896)
- Latoia cineracea (Karsch, 1896)
- Latoia nivosa (Felder, 1874)
- Latoia nivosa (Felder, 1874)
- Latoia phlebodes (Karsch, 1896)
- Micraphe lateritia Karsch, 1896
- Niphadolepis nivata Karsch, 1896
- Niphadolepis soluta Karsch, 1896
- Parasa ananii Karsch, 1896
- Parasa euchlora Karsch, 1895
- Parasa prussi Karsch, 1896
- Zinara ploetzi Schaus & Clements, 1893

== Lymantriidae ==
- Aroa achrodisca Hampson, 1910
- Barobata trocta Karsch, 1895
- Conigephyra discolepia (Hampson, 1910)
- Conigephyra sericaria (Hering, 1926)
- Dasychira achatina Hering, 1926
- Dasychira albosignata Holland, 1893
- Dasychira bacchans (Karsch, 1898)
- Dasychira castor Hering, 1926
- Dasychira omissa Hering, 1926
- Dasychira solida (Karsch, 1895)
- Heteronygmia flavescens Holland, 1893
- Lacipa quadripunctata Dewitz, 1881
- Laelia curvivirgata Karsch, 1895
- Laelia diascia Hampson, 1905
- Laelia lignicolor Holland, 1893
- Laelia xyleutis Hampson, 1905
- Laelioproctis taeniosoma Hering, 1926
- Leucoma parva (Plötz, 1880)
- Lymantria vacillans Walker, 1855
- Paqueta chloroscia (Hering, 1926)
- Pseudonotodonta virescens (Möschler, 1887)
- Stracena oloris (Hering, 1926)
- Stracena promelaena (Holland, 1893)
- Viridichirana chlorophila (Hering, 1926)

== Metarbelidae ==
- Haberlandia togoensis Lehmann, 2011
- Lebedodes bassa (Bethune-Baker, 1908)
- Metarbela fumida Karsch, 1896
- Metarbela micra Karsch, 1896
- Metarbela onusta Karsch, 1896
- Moyencharia ochreicosta (Gaede, 1929)
- Salagena transversa Walker, 1865
- Teragra insignifica Gaede, 1929

== Noctuidae ==
- Acontia hemiselenias (Hampson, 1918)
- Acontia imitatrix Wallengren, 1856
- Acontia porphyrea (Butler, 1898)
- Acontia veroxanthia Hacker, Legrain & Fibiger, 2010
- Aegocera obliqua Mabille, 1893
- Agoma trimenii (Felder, 1874)
- Anoba biangulata (Walker, 1869)
- Asota speciosa (Drury, 1773)
- Brevipecten confluens Hampson, 1926
- Cerocala caelata Karsch, 1896
- Digama aganais (Felder, 1874)
- Eublemma tytrocoides Hacker & Hausmann, 2010
- Feliniopsis kuehnei Hacker & Fibiger, 2007
- Holoxanthina lutosa (Karsch, 1895)
- Masalia flavocarnea (Hampson, 1903)
- Masalia galatheae (Wallengren, 1856)
- Misa cosmetica Karsch, 1898
- Misa memnonia Karsch, 1895
- Ozarba domina (Holland, 1894)
- Phaegorista leucomelas (Herrich-Schäffer, 1855)
- Phaegorista similis Walker, 1869
- Thiacidas juvenis Hacker & Zilli, 2007
- Thiacidas stassarti Hacker & Zilli, 2007

== Nolidae ==
- Maurilia conjuncta Gaede, 1915

== Notodontidae ==
- Afrocerura leonensis (Hampson, 1910)
- Afrocerura leonensis (Hampson, 1910)
- Afropydna indistincta (Gaede, 1928)
- Amyops ingens Karsch, 1895
- Anaphe subsordida Butler, 1893
- Anaphe venata Butler, 1878
- Antheua bidentata (Hampson, 1910)
- Antheua bossumensis (Gaede, 1915)
- Antheua gallans (Karsch, 1895)
- Antheua simplex Walker, 1855
- Bisolita minuta (Holland, 1893)
- Bisolita strigata (Aurivillius, 1906)
- Desmeocraera albicans Gaede, 1928
- Desmeocraera vernalis Distant, 1897
- Eujansea afra (Bethune-Baker, 1911)
- Galona serena Karsch, 1895
- Hampsonita esmeralda (Hampson, 1910)
- Phalera atrata (Grünberg, 1907)
- Rhenea mediata (Walker, 1865)
- Scrancia stictica Hampson, 1910
- Subscrancia nigra (Aurivillius, 1904)
- Utidaviana citana (Schaus, 1893)

== Psychidae ==
- Acanthopsyche carbonarius Karsch, 1900

== Pyralidae ==
- Acracona remipedalis (Karsch, 1900)

== Saturniidae ==
- Aurivillius arata (Westwood, 1849)
- Bunaeopsis hersilia (Westwood, 1849)
- Bunaeopsis licharbas (Maassen & Weymer, 1885)
- Imbrasia epimethea (Drury, 1772)
- Lobobunaea christyi (Sharpe, 1889)
- Lobobunaea phaedusa (Drury, 1782)
- Micragone agathylla (Westwood, 1849)
- Micragone rougeriei Bouyer, 2008
- Nudaurelia alopia Westwood, 1849
- Nudaurelia emini (Butler, 1888)
- Pseudimbrasia deyrollei (J. Thomson, 1858)

== Sesiidae ==
- Albuna africana Le Cerf, 1917

== Sphingidae ==
- Temnora radiata (Karsch, 1892)

== Thyrididae ==
- Byblisia setipes (Plötz, 1880)
- Cecidothyris orbiferalis (Gaede, 1917)
- Lelymena misalis Karsch, 1900
- Marmax hyparchus (Cramer, 1779)
- Marmax semiaurata (Walker, 1854)
- Trichobaptes auristrigata (Plötz, 1880)

== Tortricidae ==
- Thaumatotibia leucotreta (Meyrick, 1913)

== Zygaenidae ==
- Saliunca aurifrons Walker, 1864
- Saliunca styx (Fabricius, 1775)
- Syringura triplex (Plötz, 1880)
