= List of moths of Lesotho =

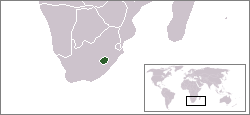
Location of Lesotho

Moths of Lesotho represent about 90 known moth species. The moths (mostly nocturnal) and butterflies (mostly diurnal) together make up the taxonomic order Lepidoptera.

This is a list of moth species which have been recorded in Lesotho.

== Arctiidae ==
- Cyana pretoriae (Distant, 1897)
- Cymaroa grisea (Thunberg, 1784)
- Macrosia chalybeata Hampson, 1901
- Micrilema craushayi Hampson, 1903

== Crambidae ==
- Ancylolomia prepiella Hampson, 1919
- Caffrocrambus chalcimerus (Hampson, 1919)
- Lamprophaia ablactalis (Walker, 1859)
- Nomophila noctuella ([Denis & Schiffermüller], 1775)

== Geometridae ==
- Drepanogynis arcuifera Prout, 1934
- Drepanogynis aspitatoides Krüger, 2002
- Drepanogynis bifasciata (Dewitz, 1881)
- Drepanogynis determinata (Walker, 1860)
- Drepanogynis hilaris Krüger, 2002
- Drepanogynis hypoplea Prout, 1938
- Drepanogynis mixtaria Guenée, 1858
- Drepanogynis nipholibes (Prout, 1938)
- Drepanogynis pulla Krüger, 2002
- Epirrhoe achatina Prout, 1915
- Isturgia disputaria (Guenée, 1858)

== Hepialidae ==
- Eudalaca albistriata (Hampson, 1910)

== Lasiocampidae ==
- Bombycomorpha bifascia (Walker, 1855)

== Lymantriidae ==
- Bracharoa quadripunctata (Wallengren, 1875)

== Metarbelidae ==
- Arbelodes albitorquata (Hampson, 1910)
- Arbelodes deprinsi Lehmann, 2010
- Arbelodes sticticosta (Hampson, 1910)
- Metarbela leucostigma (Hampson, 1910)
- Teragra leucostigma Hampson, 1910

== Noctuidae ==
- Achaea sordida (Walker, 1865)
- Acontia citripennis (Hampson, 1910)
- Acontia dispar (Walker, [1858])
- Acontia natalis (Guenée, 1852)
- Acontia sphendonistis (Hampson, 1902)
- Acontia tanzaniae Hacker, Legrain & Fibiger, 2010
- Acontia trychaenoides Wallengren, 1856
- Acrapex aenigma (Felder & Rogenhofer, 1874)
- Acrapex carnea Hampson, 1905
- Adisura aerugo (Felder & Rogenhofer, 1874)
- Agrotis biconica Kollar, 1844
- Agrotis crassilinea Wallengren, 1860
- Agrotis longidentifera (Hampson, 1903)
- Agrotis segetum ([Denis & Schiffermüller], 1775)
- Athetis chionopis Hampson, 1909
- Athetis melanephra Hampson, 1909
- Athetis pallicornis (Felder & Rogenhofer, 1874)
- Caffristis ferrogrisea (Hampson, 1902)
- Callopistria latreillei (Duponchel, 1827)
- Calpiformis craushayi (Hampson, 1905)
- Caradrina glaucistis Hampson, 1902
- Caradrina xanthopis (Hampson, 1909)
- Chrysodeixis acuta (Walker, [1858])
- Cucullia pallidistria Felder & Rogenhofer, 1874
- Cyligramma latona (Cramer, 1775)
- Diaphone eumela (Stoll, 1781)
- Diargyria argyrogramma Krüger, 2005
- Diargyria argyrostolmus Krüger, 2005
- Eublemma anachoresis (Wallengren, 1863)
- Eublemma flaviceps Hampson, 1902
- Eublemma foedosa (Guenée, 1852)
- Eublemma scitula (Rambur, 1833)
- Eublemma uninotata Hampson, 1902
- Euplexia augens Felder & Rogenhofer, 1874
- Grammodes euclidioides Guenée, 1852
- Grammodes stolida (Fabricius, 1775)
- Heliocheilus stigmatia (Hampson, 1903)
- Heliothis scutuligera Guenée, 1852
- Leucania loreyi (Duponchel, 1827)
- Masalia disticta (Hampson, 1902)
- Masalia galatheae (Wallengren, 1856)
- Matopo typica Distant, 1898
- Mentaxya muscosa Geyer, 1837
- Mentaxya rimosa (Guenée, 1852)
- Micragrotis puncticostata (Hampson, 1902)
- Micragrotis strigibasis (Hampson, 1902)
- Oligia ambigua (Walker, 1858)
- Ophiusa selenaris (Guenée, 1852)
- Ozarba hypoxantha (Wallengren, 1860)
- Plusia angulum Guenée, 1852
- Sesamia cretica Lederer, 1857
- Sesamia epunctifera Hampson, 1902
- Sesamia rubritincta Hampson, 1902
- Spodoptera exigua (Hübner, 1808)
- Syngrapha circumflexa (Linnaeus, 1767)
- Thysanoplusia exquisita (Felder & Rogenhofer, 1874)
- Trichoplusia ni (Hübner, [1803])
- Trichoplusia orichalcea (Fabricius, 1775)
- Tycomarptes inferior (Guenée, 1852)
- Zalaca snelleni (Wallengren, 1875)

== Nolidae ==
- Earias insulana (Boisduval, 1833)

== Psychidae ==
- Criocharacta amphiactis Meyrick, 1939

== Pterophoridae ==
- Platyptilia bowkeri Kovtunovich & Ustjuzhanin, 2011
- Platyptilia sochivkoi Kovtunovich & Ustjuzhanin, 2011
- Hellinsia basuto Kovtunovich & Ustjuzhanin, 2011
- Merrifieldia innae Kovtunovich & Ustjuzhanin, 2011

== Pyralidae ==
- Aglossa phaealis Hampson, 1906
