= Teragra =

Scientific classification
- Kingdom: Animalia
- Phylum: Arthropoda
- Class: Insecta
- Order: Lepidoptera
- Family: Cossidae
- Subfamily: Metarbelinae
- Genus: Teragra; Walker, 1855

Genus of moths

Teragra is a genus of moths in the family Cossidae.

== Species ==
- Teragra althodes Hampson, 1920
- Teragra angulifascia Gaede, 1929
- Teragra cammae Lehmann, 2007
- Teragra clarior Gaede, 1929
- Teragra conspersa Walker, 1855
- Teragra guttifera Hampson, 1910
- Teragra insignifica Gaede, 1929
- Teragra irvingi Janse, 1925
- Teragra lemairei Rougeot, 1977
- Teragra macroptera Mey, 2011
- Teragra ochreisticta Gaede, 1929
- Teragra orphnina Hering, 1932
- Teragra punctana Mey, 2011
- Teragra quadrangula Gaede, 1929
- Teragra simplicius Le Cerf
- Teragra trimaculata Gaede, 1929
- Teragra tristicha Hampson, 1920
- Teragra umbrifera Hampson, 1910
- Teragra villiersi Rougeot, 1977
- Teragra vogti Bethune-Baker, 1927

== Former species ==
- Teragra basiplaga Gaede, 1929
- Teragra fuscoradiata Gaede, 1929
- Teragra leucostigma Hampson, 1910
- Teragra neurosticta Hampson, 1910
- Teragra ochreicosta Gaede, 1929
- Teragra simillima Hampson, 1910
- Teragra sticticosta Hampson, 1910
