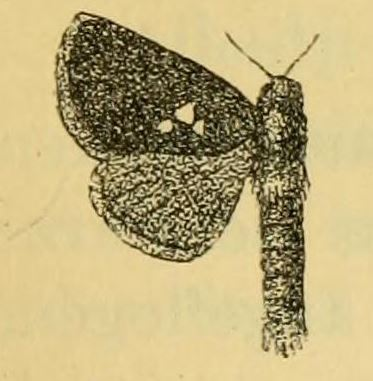
- Metarbela triguttata

Scientific classification
- Domain: Eukaryota
- Kingdom: Animalia
- Phylum: Arthropoda
- Class: Insecta
- Order: Lepidoptera
- Family: Cossidae
- Subfamily: Metarbelinae
- Genus: Metarbela; Holland, 1893

= Metarbela =

Genus of moths

Metarbela is a genus of moths in the family Cossidae described by William Jacob Holland in 1893.

== Species ==
- Metarbela abdulrahmani Lehmann, 2008
- Metarbela alluaudi Le Cerf, 1914
- Metarbela bifasciata Gaede, 1929
- Metarbela bipuncta Hampson, 1920
- Metarbela bueana Strand, 1912
- Metarbela chidzingai Lehmann, 2008
- Metarbela cinereolimbata Le Cerf, 1914
- Metarbela costistrigata Hampson, 1920
- Metarbela cremorna Hampson, 1920
- Metarbela cymaphora Hampson, 1910
- Metarbela dialeuca Hampson, 1910
- Metarbela diodonta Hampson, 1916
- Metarbela distincta Le Cerf
- Metarbela erecta Gaede, 1929
- Metarbela fumida Karsch, 1896
- Metarbela funebris Gaede, 1929
- Metarbela haberlandorum Lehmann, 1997
- Metarbela inconspicua Gaede, 1929
- Metarbela kobesi Lehmann, 2007
- Metarbela laguna Hampson, 1920
- Metarbela latifasciata Gaede, 1929
- Metarbela leucostigma (Hampson, 1910)
- Metarbela lornadepewae Lehmann, 2009
- Metarbela micra Karsch, 1896
- Metarbela naumanni Mey, 2005
- Metarbela nubifera Bethune-Baker, 1909
- Metarbela ochracea Gaede, 1929
- Metarbela onusta Karsch, 1896
- Metarbela perstriata Hampson, 1916
- Metarbela plagifera Gaede, 1929
- Metarbela pygatula Strand, 1912
- Metarbela quadriguttata Aurivillius, 1925
- Metarbela rava Karsch, 1896
- Metarbela reticulosana Strand, 1912
- Metarbela rufa Gaede, 1929
- Metarbela shimonii Lehmann, 2008
- Metarbela simillima (Hampson, 1910)
- Metarbela sphacobapta Tams, 1929
- Metarbela stivafer Holland, 1893
- Metarbela taifensis Wiltshire, 1988
- Metarbela triangularis Gaede, 1929
- Metarbela triguttata Aurivillius, 1905
- Metarbela trisignata Gaede, 1929
- Metarbela tuckeri Butler, 1875
- Metarbela vaualba Hampson, 1920
- Metarbela weinmanni Lehmann, 2007

== Former species ==
- Metarbela albitorquata Hampson, 1910
- Metarbela arcifera Hampson, 1909
- Metarbela flavicolor Janse, 1925
- Metarbela heringi Janse, 1930
- Metarbela iridescens Janse, 1925
- Metarbela marginemaculata Gaede
- Metarbela neurosticta (Hampson, 1910)
- Metarbela pagana Strand, 1909
- Metarbela pallescens Le Cerf, 1914
- Metarbela splendida D. S. Fletcher, 1968
