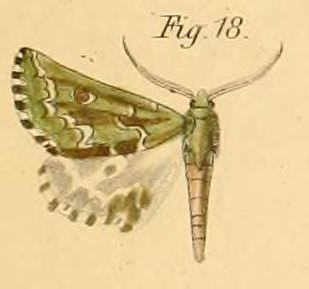
- Drepanogynis bifasciata

Scientific classification
- Kingdom: Animalia
- Phylum: Arthropoda
- Clade: Pancrustacea
- Class: Insecta
- Order: Lepidoptera
- Family: Geometridae
- Subfamily: Ennominae
- Genus: Drepanogynis; Guenée in Boisduval & Guenée, 1857

Type species
- Drepanogynis mixtaria Guenée in Boisduval & Guenée, 1857

Diversity
- Over 150 species

Synonyms
- Apleroneura Warren, 1898; Lissodes Warren, 1914 (non Berthold, 1827: preoccupied); Phrudochorda Warren, 1898

= Drepanogynis =

Genus of moths

Drepanogynis is a genus in the geometer moth family (Geometridae). Long considered to hold about 5 dozen species, this number has been doubled after the last major revision. They are stout-bodied and hairy by geometer moth standards, usually have pale hindwings and rest with their wings angled upwards like a roof, as Nacophorini do. The genus is by and large restricted to Africa south of the Equator, with most species occurring in southern Africa.

This genus belongs to the subfamily Ennominae. Therein, its relationships are not quite clear, but they may indeed belong into the tribe Nacophorini. These they resemble in general appearance as mentioned above, as well as having an anellus with lateral processes, a simple rodlike uncus, a strong gnathos, simple valvae and an aedeagus with separate cornuti. Closely related genera seem to be Argyrophora, Hebdomophruda, Microligia and Pseudomaenas.

== Selected species ==
Species of Drepanogynis include:

- Drepanogynis bifasciata (Dewitz, 1881)
- Drepanogynis cervina (Warren, 1894)
- Drepanogynis curvaria (Dewitz, 1881)
- Drepanogynis fuscimargo (Warren, 1898)
- Drepanogynis herbuloti Viette, 1970
- Drepanogynis hypoplea Prout, 1938
- Drepanogynis hypopyrrha (Prout, 1932)
- Drepanogynis incogitata Prout, 1915
- Drepanogynis itremo Viette, 1974
- Drepanogynis miltodes Krüger, 2005
- Drepanogynis mixtaria Guenée, 1857
- Drepanogynis nephelochroa Krüger, 2005
- Drepanogynis nicotiana Viette, 1977
- Drepanogynis peyrierasi Viette, 1974
- Drepanogynis protactosema Prout, 1932
- Drepanogynis styx Krüger, 2005
- Drepanogynis subrosea Krüger, 2002
- Drepanogynis synclinia (Prout, 1938)
- Drepanogynis tabacicolor Krüger, 2002
- Drepanogynis tenoris (Prout, 1934)
- Drepanogynis tigrinata Viette, 1972
- Drepanogynis tornimacula Herbulot, 1957
- Drepanogynis trachyacta (Prout, 1922)
- Drepanogynis tripartita (Warren, 1898)
- Drepanogynis tsaratanana Viette, 1980
- Drepanogynis unilineata (Warren, 1897)
- Drepanogynis valida (Warren, 1914)
- Drepanogynis vara Prout, 1922
- Drepanogynis variciliata Krüger, 2002
- Drepanogynis villaria (Felder & Rogenhofer, 1875)
- Drepanogynis viridipennis Krüger, 2002
- Drepanogynis viridipilosa Krüger, 2002
- Drepanogynis xanthographa Krüger, 2002
- Drepanogynis xylophanes Krüger, 2002
