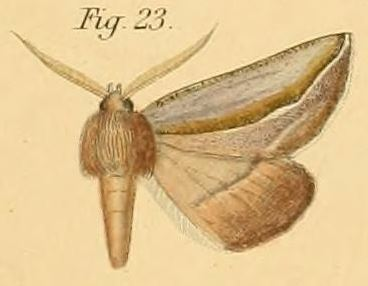

Scientific classification
- Domain: Eukaryota
- Kingdom: Animalia
- Phylum: Arthropoda
- Class: Insecta
- Order: Lepidoptera
- Family: Geometridae
- Genus: Drepanogynis
- Species: D. curvaria

Binomial name
- Drepanogynis curvaria (Dewitz, 1881)

Synonyms
- Ligia curvaria Dewitz, 1881

= Drepanogynis curvaria =

Species of moth

Drepanogynis curvaria is a species of moth of the family Geometridae first described by Hermann Dewitz in 1881. It is found in South Africa.
