= Teragra cammae =

Scientific classification
- Kingdom: Animalia
- Phylum: Arthropoda
- Clade: Pancrustacea
- Class: Insecta
- Order: Lepidoptera
- Family: Cossidae
- Genus: Teragra
- Species: T. cammae

Binomial name
- Teragra cammae Lehmann, 2007

Species of moth

Teragra cammae is a moth in the family Cossidae. It is found in Namibia.
