= Teragra vogti =

Scientific classification
- Domain: Eukaryota
- Kingdom: Animalia
- Phylum: Arthropoda
- Class: Insecta
- Order: Lepidoptera
- Family: Cossidae
- Genus: Teragra
- Species: T. vogti

Binomial name
- Teragra vogti Bethune-Baker, 1927

Species of moth

Teragra vogti is a moth in the family Cossidae. It is found in South Africa.

The wingspan is about 35 mm. The forewings are very pale greyish with a dark brown subbasal area much broken up and extending below the cell to the middle of the inner margin and likewise more or less to the costa. There is a broad, indefinite, dark brown postmedian stripe which is very slightly oblique. The whole wing has a rather mottled appearance. The hindwings are pale grey, somewhat finely irrorated with darker brown.
