= Metarbela kobesi =

Scientific classification
- Domain: Eukaryota
- Kingdom: Animalia
- Phylum: Arthropoda
- Class: Insecta
- Order: Lepidoptera
- Family: Cossidae
- Genus: Metarbela
- Species: M. kobesi

Binomial name
- Metarbela kobesi Lehmann, 2007

Species of moth

Metarbela kobesi is a moth in the family Cossidae. It is found in Namibia.
