= Anoba ovalis =

Scientific classification
- Kingdom: Animalia
- Phylum: Arthropoda
- Clade: Pancrustacea
- Class: Insecta
- Order: Lepidoptera
- Superfamily: Noctuoidea
- Family: Erebidae
- Genus: Anoba
- Species: A. ovalis

Binomial name
- Anoba ovalis Rothschild, 1917

Species of moth

Anoba ovalis is a species of moth in the family Erebidae. It is found in South America.
