= Arbelodes sebelensis =

Scientific classification
- Domain: Eukaryota
- Kingdom: Animalia
- Phylum: Arthropoda
- Class: Insecta
- Order: Lepidoptera
- Family: Cossidae
- Genus: Arbelodes
- Species: A. sebelensis

Binomial name
- Arbelodes sebelensis Lehmann, 2010

Species of moth

Arbelodes sebelensis is a moth in the family Metarbelidae. It is found in south-eastern Botswana and possibly extends eastwards into South Africa. The habitat consists of legume-dominated savanna.

The length of the forewings is about 11 mm.

== Etymology ==
The species name refers to Sebele, the type locality.
