= Metarbela quadriguttata =

Scientific classification
- Domain: Eukaryota
- Kingdom: Animalia
- Phylum: Arthropoda
- Class: Insecta
- Order: Lepidoptera
- Family: Cossidae
- Genus: Metarbela
- Species: M. quadriguttata

Binomial name
- Metarbela quadriguttata Aurivillius, 1925

Species of moth

Metarbela quadriguttata is a moth in the family Cossidae. It is found in Equatorial Guinea (Bioko).
