= Teragra angulifascia =

Scientific classification
- Kingdom: Animalia
- Phylum: Arthropoda
- Clade: Pancrustacea
- Class: Insecta
- Order: Lepidoptera
- Family: Cossidae
- Genus: Teragra
- Species: T. angulifascia

Binomial name
- Teragra angulifascia Gaede, 1929

Species of moth

Teragra angulifascia is a moth in the family Cossidae. It is found in Sierra Leone.
