= Micragrotis intendens =

Scientific classification
- Kingdom: Animalia
- Phylum: Arthropoda
- Class: Insecta
- Order: Lepidoptera
- Superfamily: Noctuoidea
- Family: Noctuidae
- Genus: Micragrotis
- Species: M. intendens

Binomial name
- Micragrotis intendens Walker, 1857

Species of moth

Micragrotis intendens is a species of moth of the family Noctuidae first described by Francis Walker in 1857. It is found in Africa, including South Africa.
