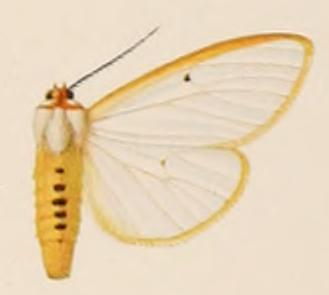

Scientific classification
- Kingdom: Animalia
- Phylum: Arthropoda
- Class: Insecta
- Order: Lepidoptera
- Superfamily: Noctuoidea
- Family: Erebidae
- Subfamily: Arctiinae
- Genus: Amsacta
- Species: A. aureolimbata

Binomial name
- Amsacta aureolimbata Rothschild, 1910

= Amsacta aureolimbata =

Species of moth

Amsacta aureolimbata is a moth of the family Erebidae. It is found in Angola, the Democratic Republic of Congo and Zambia.
