= Teragra quadrangula =

Scientific classification
- Kingdom: Animalia
- Phylum: Arthropoda
- Class: Insecta
- Order: Lepidoptera
- Family: Cossidae
- Genus: Teragra
- Species: T. quadrangula

Binomial name
- Teragra quadrangula Gaede, 1929

Species of moth

Teragra quadrangula is a moth in the family Cossidae. It is found in Tanzania.
