= Metarbela chidzingai =

Scientific classification
- Kingdom: Animalia
- Phylum: Arthropoda
- Class: Insecta
- Order: Lepidoptera
- Family: Cossidae
- Genus: Metarbela
- Species: M. chidzingai

Binomial name
- Metarbela chidzingai Lehmann, 2008

Species of moth

Metarbela chidzingai is a moth in the family Cossidae. It is found in Tanzania. The habitat consists of lowland and submontane woodlands.

The length of the forewings is about 10.5 mm.

== Etymology ==
The species is named for Saidi Ali Chidzinga of the Coastal Forest Conservation Unit.
