= Arbelodes prochesi =

Scientific classification
- Domain: Eukaryota
- Kingdom: Animalia
- Phylum: Arthropoda
- Class: Insecta
- Order: Lepidoptera
- Family: Cossidae
- Genus: Arbelodes
- Species: A. prochesi

Binomial name
- Arbelodes prochesi Lehmann, 2010

Species of moth

Arbelodes prochesi is a moth in the family Cossidae. It is found in south-central Zambia and on the Eastern Highlands of Zimbabwe, possibly extending into Mozambique. The habitat consists of legume-dominated woodland.

The length of the forewings is about 12 mm.

== Etymology ==
The species is named in honour of Dr Serban Proches.
