= Arbelodes =

Scientific classification
- Domain: Eukaryota
- Kingdom: Animalia
- Phylum: Arthropoda
- Class: Insecta
- Order: Lepidoptera
- Family: Cossidae
- Subfamily: Metarbelinae
- Genus: Arbelodes; Karsch, 1896

Genus of moths

Arbelodes is a genus of moths in the family Metarbelidae. The genus occurs in Sub-Saharan Africa, with the greatest diversity in South Africa.

== Species ==
There are 23 recognized species:

- Arbelodes agassizi Lehmann, 2010
- Arbelodes albitorquata (Hampson, 1910)
- Arbelodes claudiae Lehmann, 2010
- Arbelodes collaris Aurivillius, 1921
- Arbelodes deprinsi Lehmann, 2010
- Arbelodes dicksoni Lehmann, 2010
- Arbelodes dupreezi Lehmann, 2010
- Arbelodes flavicolor (Janse, 1925)
- Arbelodes franziskae Lehmann, 2010
- Arbelodes goellnerae Mey, 2012
- Arbelodes griseata Janse, 1925
- Arbelodes haberlandorum Lehmann, 2010
- Arbelodes heringi (Janse, 1930)
- Arbelodes iridescens (Janse, 1925)
- Arbelodes kroonae Lehmann, 2007
- Arbelodes kruegeri Lehmann, 2010
- Arbelodes meridialis Karsch, 1896 (= Arbelodes meridionalis von Dalla Torre & Strand, 1923)
- Arbelodes mondeensis Lehmann, 2010
- Arbelodes prochesi Lehmann, 2010
- Arbelodes sebelensis Lehmann, 2010
- Arbelodes shimonii Lehmann, 2010
- Arbelodes sticticosta (Hampson, 1910)
- Arbelodes varii Lehmann, 2010
