= Teragra tristicha =

Scientific classification
- Kingdom: Animalia
- Phylum: Arthropoda
- Class: Insecta
- Order: Lepidoptera
- Family: Cossidae
- Genus: Teragra
- Species: T. tristicha

Binomial name
- Teragra tristicha Hampson, 1920

Species of moth

Teragra tristicha is a moth in the family Cossidae. It is found in Malawi.
