= Amsacta nivea =

Scientific classification
- Kingdom: Animalia
- Phylum: Arthropoda
- Class: Insecta
- Order: Lepidoptera
- Superfamily: Noctuoidea
- Family: Erebidae
- Subfamily: Arctiinae
- Genus: Amsacta
- Species: A. nivea

Binomial name
- Amsacta nivea Hampson, 1916

Species of moth

Amsacta nivea is a moth of the family Erebidae. It was described by George Hampson in 1916. It is found in South Africa.
