= Anoba rigida =

Scientific classification
- Kingdom: Animalia
- Phylum: Arthropoda
- Clade: Pancrustacea
- Class: Insecta
- Order: Lepidoptera
- Superfamily: Noctuoidea
- Family: Erebidae
- Genus: Anoba
- Species: A. rigida

Binomial name
- Anoba rigida Swinhoe, 1895

Species of moth

Anoba rigida is a species of moth in the family Erebidae. It is found in Borneo.
