= Teragra conspersa =

Scientific classification
- Kingdom: Animalia
- Phylum: Arthropoda
- Class: Insecta
- Order: Lepidoptera
- Family: Cossidae
- Genus: Teragra
- Species: T. conspersa

Binomial name
- Teragra conspersa Walker, 1855

Species of moth

Teragra conspersa is a moth in the family Cossidae. It is found in South Africa.
