= Metarbela bifasciata =

Scientific classification
- Domain: Eukaryota
- Kingdom: Animalia
- Phylum: Arthropoda
- Class: Insecta
- Order: Lepidoptera
- Family: Cossidae
- Genus: Metarbela
- Species: M. bifasciata

Binomial name
- Metarbela bifasciata Gaede, 1929

Species of moth

Metarbela bifasciata is a moth in the family Metarbelidae. It is found in Nigeria.
