= Metarbela triguttata =

Scientific classification
- Kingdom: Animalia
- Phylum: Arthropoda
- Class: Insecta
- Order: Lepidoptera
- Family: Cossidae
- Genus: Metarbela
- Species: M. triguttata

Binomial name
- Metarbela triguttata Aurivillius, 1905

Species of moth

Metarbela triguttata is a moth in the family Cossidae. It is found in Cameroon.

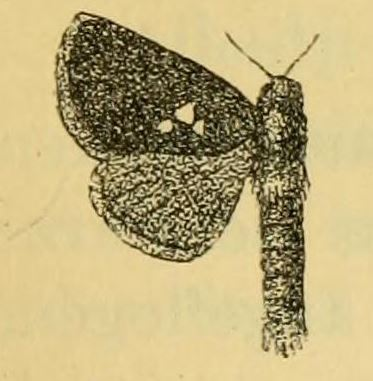
Metarbela triguttata
