= Metarbela funebris =

Scientific classification
- Domain: Eukaryota
- Kingdom: Animalia
- Phylum: Arthropoda
- Class: Insecta
- Order: Lepidoptera
- Family: Cossidae
- Genus: Metarbela
- Species: M. funebris

Binomial name
- Metarbela funebris Gaede, 1929

Species of moth

Metarbela funebris is a moth in the family Cossidae. It is found in Nigeria.
