= Metarbela shimonii =

Scientific classification
- Domain: Eukaryota
- Kingdom: Animalia
- Phylum: Arthropoda
- Class: Insecta
- Order: Lepidoptera
- Family: Cossidae
- Genus: Metarbela
- Species: M. shimonii

Binomial name
- Metarbela shimonii Lehmann, 2008

Species of moth

Metarbela shimonii is a moth in the family Cossidae. It is found in Kenya, where it has been recorded from Gogoni Forest and Kaya Muhaka. The habitat consists of legume-dominated lowland coastal forests.

The length of the forewings is about 9 mm.

== Etymology ==
The species is named for Shimoni Lehmann, the son of the author.
