= Metarbela bueana =

Scientific classification
- Kingdom: Animalia
- Phylum: Arthropoda
- Class: Insecta
- Order: Lepidoptera
- Family: Cossidae
- Genus: Metarbela
- Species: M. bueana

Binomial name
- Metarbela bueana Strand, 1912

Species of carpenter miller moth

Metarbela bueana is a moth in the family Cossidae. It is found in Cameroon.
