= Drepanogynis hypopyrrha =

Scientific classification
- Kingdom: Animalia
- Phylum: Arthropoda
- Clade: Pancrustacea
- Class: Insecta
- Order: Lepidoptera
- Family: Geometridae
- Genus: Drepanogynis
- Species: D. hypopyrrha

Binomial name
- Drepanogynis hypopyrrha Prout, 1932

Synonyms
- Derrioides hypopyrrha Prout, 1932

Species of moth

Drepanogynis hypopyrrha is a species of moth of the family Geometridae. It is found in East Madagascar.

The wingspan of this species is 40mm, it is of Prussian red colour, much suffused with some dull purple. The underside is orange-red.
