= Anoba mexicana =

Scientific classification
- Kingdom: Animalia
- Phylum: Arthropoda
- Clade: Pancrustacea
- Class: Insecta
- Order: Lepidoptera
- Superfamily: Noctuoidea
- Family: Erebidae
- Genus: Anoba
- Species: A. mexicana

Binomial name
- Anoba mexicana Walker, 1865

Species of moth

Anoba mexicana is a species of moth in the family Erebidae. It is found in Trinidad and Tobago.
