= Anoba pectinata =

Scientific classification
- Kingdom: Animalia
- Phylum: Arthropoda
- Clade: Pancrustacea
- Class: Insecta
- Order: Lepidoptera
- Superfamily: Noctuoidea
- Family: Erebidae
- Genus: Anoba
- Species: A. pectinata

Binomial name
- Anoba pectinata (Hampson 1896)

Synonyms
- Baniana pectinata, Bessacta javensis

Species of moth

Anoba pectinata is a species of moth of the family Erebidae. First described by Hampson, 1896.

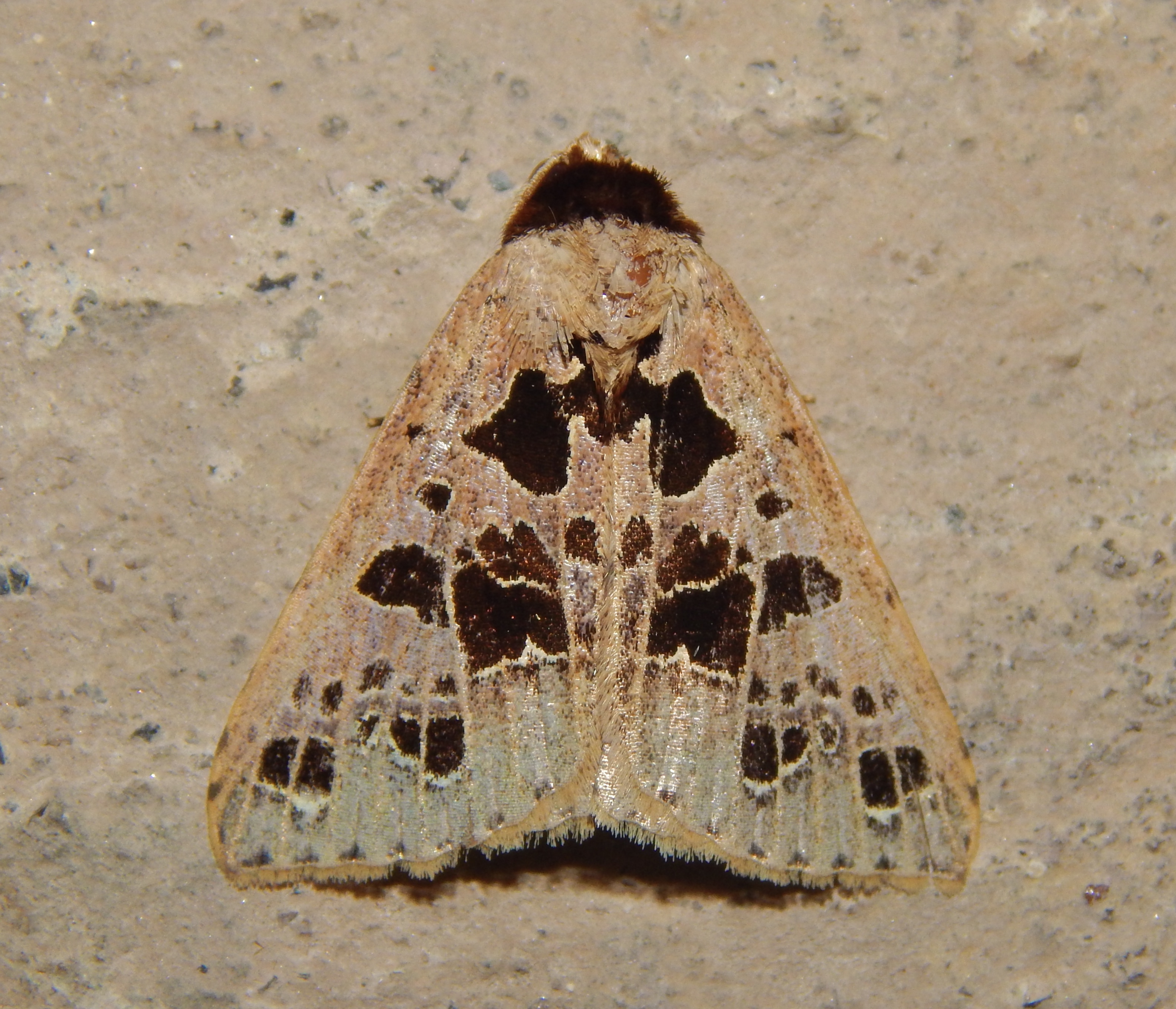
