= Anoba disjuncta =

Scientific classification
- Kingdom: Animalia
- Phylum: Arthropoda
- Clade: Pancrustacea
- Class: Insecta
- Order: Lepidoptera
- Superfamily: Noctuoidea
- Family: Erebidae
- Genus: Anoba
- Species: A. disjuncta

Binomial name
- Anoba disjuncta Walker, 1865

Species of moth

Anoba disjuncta is a species of moth in the family Erebidae. It is found in Africa, including South Africa, Eswatini, and Mozambique.
