= Metarbela bipuncta =

Scientific classification
- Kingdom: Animalia
- Phylum: Arthropoda
- Class: Insecta
- Order: Lepidoptera
- Family: Cossidae
- Genus: Metarbela
- Species: M. bipuncta

Binomial name
- Metarbela bipuncta Hampson, 1920

Species of moth

Metarbela bipuncta is a moth in the family Cossidae. It is found in Malawi.
