= Teragra ochreisticta =

Scientific classification
- Domain: Eukaryota
- Kingdom: Animalia
- Phylum: Arthropoda
- Class: Insecta
- Order: Lepidoptera
- Family: Cossidae
- Genus: Teragra
- Species: T. ochreisticta

Binomial name
- Teragra ochreisticta Gaede, 1929

Species of moth

Teragra ochreisticta is a moth in the family Cossidae. It is found in Ghana.
