= Teragra villiersi =

Scientific classification
- Kingdom: Animalia
- Phylum: Arthropoda
- Class: Insecta
- Order: Lepidoptera
- Family: Cossidae
- Genus: Teragra
- Species: T. villiersi

Binomial name
- Teragra villiersi Rougeot, 1977

Species of moth

Teragra villiersi is a moth in the family Cossidae. It is found in Ethiopia.
