= Metarbela perstriata =

Scientific classification
- Kingdom: Animalia
- Phylum: Arthropoda
- Class: Insecta
- Order: Lepidoptera
- Family: Cossidae
- Genus: Metarbela
- Species: M. perstriata

Binomial name
- Metarbela perstriata Hampson, 1916

Species of moth

Metarbela perstriata is a moth in the family Cossidae. It is found in Kenya.
