= Amsacta nigrisignata =

Scientific classification
- Kingdom: Animalia
- Phylum: Arthropoda
- Class: Insecta
- Order: Lepidoptera
- Superfamily: Noctuoidea
- Family: Erebidae
- Subfamily: Arctiinae
- Genus: Amsacta
- Species: A. nigrisignata

Binomial name
- Amsacta nigrisignata Gaede, 1923

Species of moth

Amsacta nigrisignata is a moth of the family Erebidae. It was described by Max Gaede in 1923. It is found mainly in Ethiopia, but also other parts of Africa.
