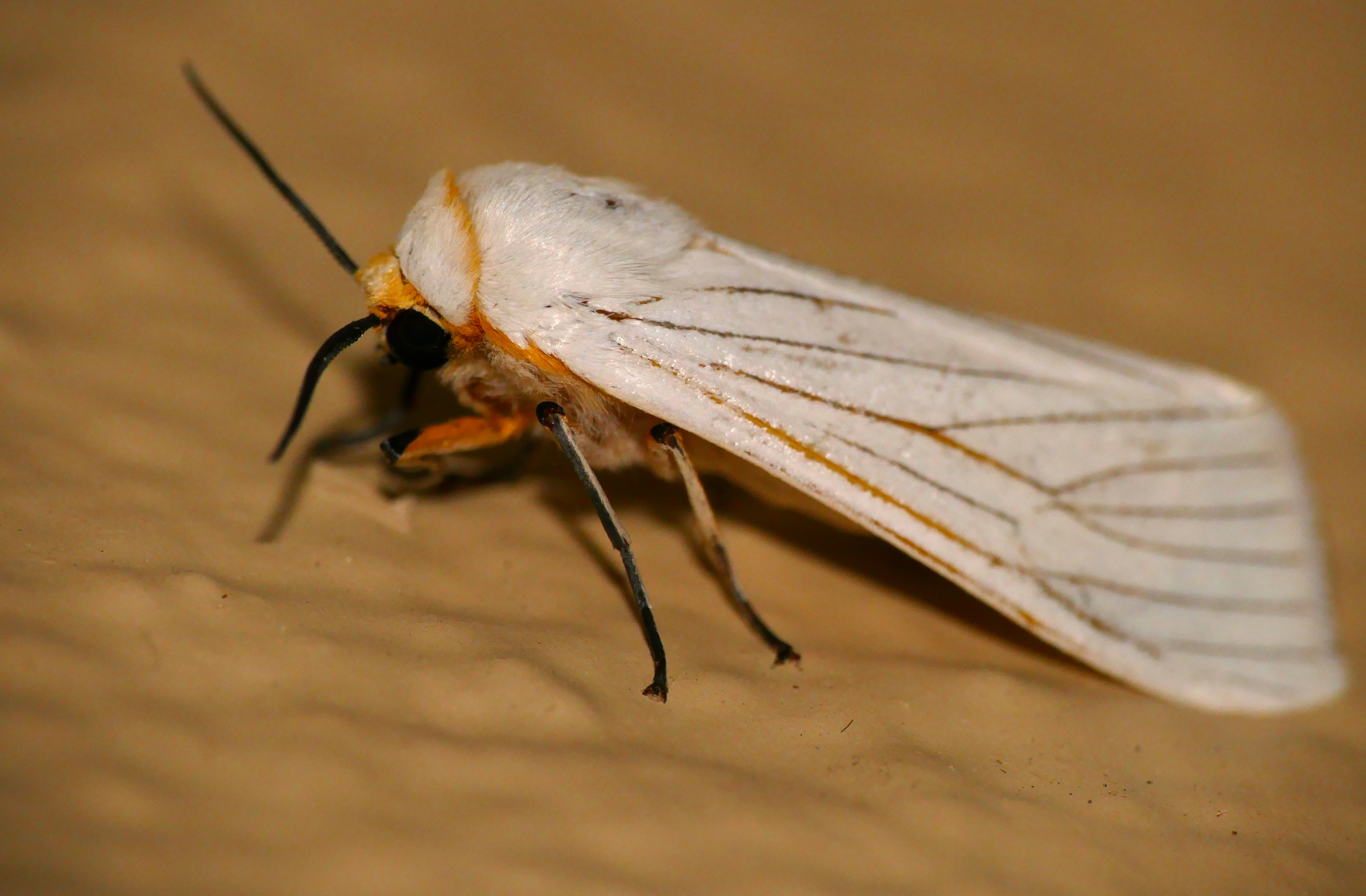
- Amsacta grammiphlebia

Scientific classification
- Kingdom: Animalia
- Phylum: Arthropoda
- Class: Insecta
- Order: Lepidoptera
- Superfamily: Noctuoidea
- Family: Erebidae
- Subfamily: Arctiinae
- Subtribe: Spilosomina
- Genus: Amsacta; Walker, 1855

Type species
- Amsacta marginalis Walker, 1855

= Amsacta =

Genus of moths

Amsacta is a genus of tiger moths in the family Erebidae erected by Francis Walker in 1855. The genus contains several species that need a review.

== Species congeneric to the type species ==
- Amsacta fuscosa (Bartel, 1903)
- Amsacta latimarginalis Rothschild, 1933
- Amsacta marginalis Walker, 1855

=== Amsacta sensu lato ===
- Amsacta aureolimbata Rothschild, 1910
- Amsacta duberneti Toulgoët, 1968
- Amsacta flavicostata (Gaede, 1916)
- Amsacta grammiphlebia Hampson, 1901
- Amsacta moloneyi Druce, 1887
- Amsacta nigrisignata Gaede, 1923
- Amsacta nivea Hampson, 1916
- Amsacta paolii Berio, 1936
