= Metarbela nubifera =

Scientific classification
- Domain: Eukaryota
- Kingdom: Animalia
- Phylum: Arthropoda
- Class: Insecta
- Order: Lepidoptera
- Family: Cossidae
- Genus: Metarbela
- Species: M. nubifera

Binomial name
- Metarbela nubifera (Bethune-Baker, 1909)

Synonyms
- Marshalliana nubifera Bethune-Baker, 1909

Species of moth

Metarbela nubifera is a moth in the family Cossidae. It is found in Kenya and Uganda.
