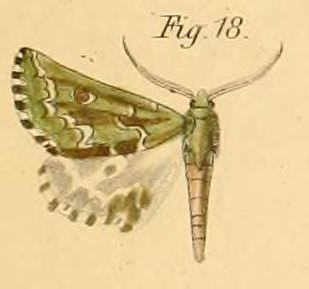

Scientific classification
- Domain: Eukaryota
- Kingdom: Animalia
- Phylum: Arthropoda
- Class: Insecta
- Order: Lepidoptera
- Family: Geometridae
- Genus: Drepanogynis
- Species: D. bifasciata

Binomial name
- Drepanogynis bifasciata (Dewitz, 1881)

Synonyms
- Argyrophora bifasciata Dewitz, 1881; Axiodes bifasciata Warren, 1894

= Drepanogynis bifasciata =

Sargasso Emerald

Species of moth

Drepanogynis bifasciata, the Sargasso Emerald, is a species of moth of the family Geometridae first described by Hermann Dewitz in 1881. It is found in South Africa, Lesotho, and Zimbabwe.

== Description ==
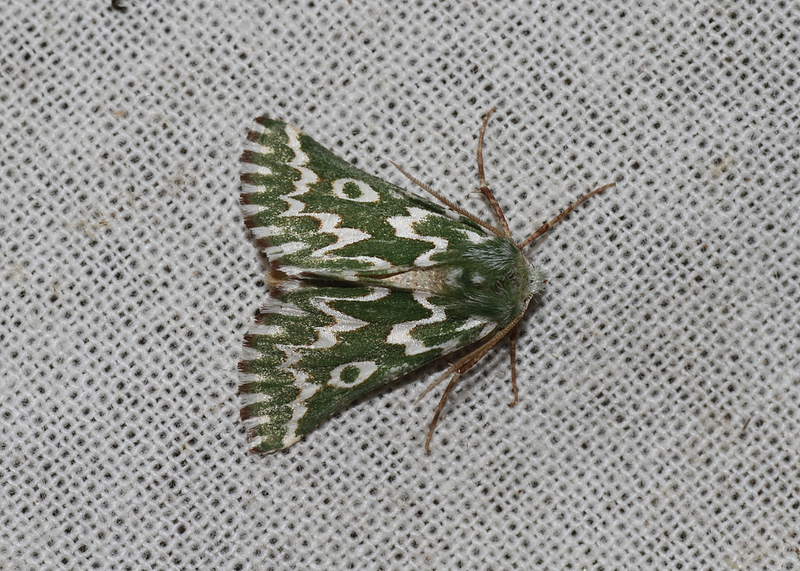
In Karoo National Park, South Africa

"Forewing 13-16mm. Thorax green, abdomen brown; forewings green, marked with 2 wide, meandering white lines (edged with brown in some specimens) and white ring between, margins with white flashes, sometimes brown between these; hindwings white basally with central brown cell spot, wide light brown margin often chequered brown and white." (Staude et al., 2023, p. 206)
