= Agylloides problematica =

Scientific classification
- Kingdom: Animalia
- Phylum: Arthropoda
- Class: Insecta
- Order: Lepidoptera
- Superfamily: Noctuoidea
- Family: Erebidae
- Subfamily: Arctiinae
- Genus: Agylloides
- Species: A. problematica

Binomial name
- Agylloides problematica Strand, 1912

Species of moth

Agylloides problematica is a moth of the subfamily Arctiinae. It was described by Strand in 1912. It is found in Cameroon.
