= Arbelodes dupreezi =

Scientific classification
- Domain: Eukaryota
- Kingdom: Animalia
- Phylum: Arthropoda
- Class: Insecta
- Order: Lepidoptera
- Family: Cossidae
- Genus: Arbelodes
- Species: A. dupreezi

Binomial name
- Arbelodes dupreezi Lehmann, 2010

Species of moth

Arbelodes dupreezi is a moth in the family Cossidae. It is found in Namibia, where it has been recorded from the Karas Region. The habitat consists of montane desert shrublands.

The length of the forewings is about 14 mm.

== Etymology ==
The species is named for Peter du Preez.
