= Anoba piriformis =

Scientific classification
- Kingdom: Animalia
- Phylum: Arthropoda
- Clade: Pancrustacea
- Class: Insecta
- Order: Lepidoptera
- Superfamily: Noctuoidea
- Family: Erebidae
- Genus: Anoba
- Species: A. piriformis

Binomial name
- Anoba piriformis Gaede, 1939

Species of moth

Anoba piriformis is a species of moth in the family Erebidae.
