= Anoba excurvata =

Scientific classification
- Kingdom: Animalia
- Phylum: Arthropoda
- Clade: Pancrustacea
- Class: Insecta
- Order: Lepidoptera
- Superfamily: Noctuoidea
- Family: Erebidae
- Genus: Anoba
- Species: A. excurvata

Binomial name
- Anoba excurvata Gaede, 1939

Species of moth

Anoba excurvata is a species of moth in the family Erebidae. It is found in Tanzania.
