= Metarbela ochracea =

Scientific classification
- Kingdom: Animalia
- Phylum: Arthropoda
- Class: Insecta
- Order: Lepidoptera
- Family: Cossidae
- Genus: Metarbela
- Species: M. ochracea

Binomial name
- Metarbela ochracea Gaede, 1929

Species of moth

Metarbela ochracea is a moth in the family Cossidae. It is found in Africa.
