= Anoba gobar =

Scientific classification
- Kingdom: Animalia
- Phylum: Arthropoda
- Clade: Pancrustacea
- Class: Insecta
- Order: Lepidoptera
- Superfamily: Noctuoidea
- Family: Erebidae
- Genus: Anoba
- Species: A. gobar

Binomial name
- Anoba gobar Druce, 1898

Species of moth

Anoba gobar is a species of moth in the family Erebidae.
