= Arbelodes dicksoni =

Scientific classification
- Domain: Eukaryota
- Kingdom: Animalia
- Phylum: Arthropoda
- Class: Insecta
- Order: Lepidoptera
- Family: Cossidae
- Genus: Arbelodes
- Species: A. dicksoni

Binomial name
- Arbelodes dicksoni Lehmann, 2010

Species of moth

Arbelodes dicksoni is a moth in the family Cossidae. It is found in South Africa, where it has been recorded from Cape Town. The habitat consists of subtropical thickets.

The length of the forewings is about 10 mm.

== Etymology ==
The species is named for Charles Gordon Campbell Dickson who collected the holotype.
