= Teragra orphnina =

Scientific classification
- Kingdom: Animalia
- Phylum: Arthropoda
- Class: Insecta
- Order: Lepidoptera
- Family: Cossidae
- Genus: Teragra
- Species: T. orphnina

Binomial name
- Teragra orphnina Hering, 1932

Species of moth

Teragra orphnina is a moth in the family Cossidae. It is found in the Democratic Republic of Congo.
