= Metarbela distincta =

Scientific classification
- Domain: Eukaryota
- Kingdom: Animalia
- Phylum: Arthropoda
- Class: Insecta
- Order: Lepidoptera
- Family: Cossidae
- Genus: Metarbela
- Species: M. distincta

Binomial name
- Metarbela distincta Le Cerf, 1922

Species of moth

Metarbela distincta is a moth in the family Cossidae. It is found in Kenya.
