= Micragrotis cinerosa =

Scientific classification
- Domain: Eukaryota
- Kingdom: Animalia
- Phylum: Arthropoda
- Class: Insecta
- Order: Lepidoptera
- Superfamily: Noctuoidea
- Family: Noctuidae
- Genus: Micragrotis
- Species: M. cinerosa

Binomial name
- Micragrotis cinerosa Bethune-Baker, 1911

Species of moth

Micragrotis cinerosa is a species of moth of the family Noctuidae first described by George Thomas Bethune-Baker in 1911. It is found in Africa, including South Africa.
