= Anoba sinuata =

Scientific classification
- Domain: Eukaryota
- Kingdom: Animalia
- Phylum: Arthropoda
- Class: Insecta
- Order: Lepidoptera
- Superfamily: Noctuoidea
- Family: Erebidae
- Genus: Anoba
- Species: A. sinuata

Binomial name
- Anoba sinuata (Fabricius, 1775)

Synonyms
- Baniana intorta Fabricius, 1775

Species of moth

Anoba sinuata is a moth of the family Erebidae. Formerly the genus was placed in the family Noctuidae. It is found in India, Sri Lanka, Ghana, Kenya, South Africa. Caterpillars are known to feed on Abrus precatorius.
