= Anoba atripuncta =

Scientific classification
- Kingdom: Animalia
- Phylum: Arthropoda
- Clade: Pancrustacea
- Class: Insecta
- Order: Lepidoptera
- Superfamily: Noctuoidea
- Family: Erebidae
- Genus: Anoba
- Species: A. atripuncta

Binomial name
- Anoba atripuncta Hampson, 1902

Species of moth

Anoba atripuncta is a species of moth in the family Erebidae. It is found in Africa, including South Africa, Eswatini, Zimbabwe, and Mozambique.
