= Metarbela haberlandorum =

Scientific classification
- Domain: Eukaryota
- Kingdom: Animalia
- Phylum: Arthropoda
- Class: Insecta
- Order: Lepidoptera
- Family: Cossidae
- Genus: Metarbela
- Species: M. haberlandorum

Binomial name
- Metarbela haberlandorum Lehmann, 1997

Species of moth

Metarbela haberlandorum is a moth in the family Cossidae. It is found in Kenya.
