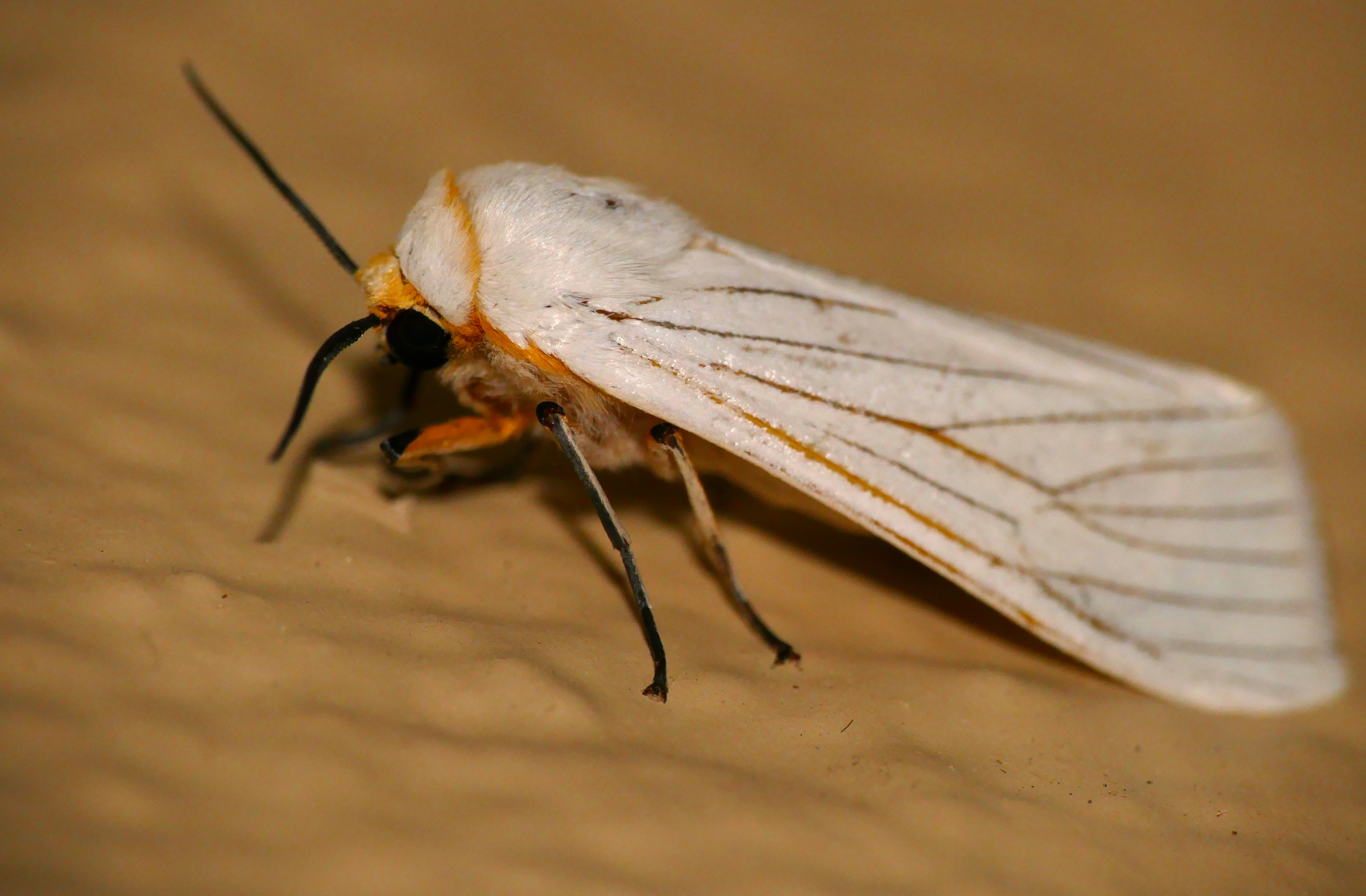

Scientific classification
- Kingdom: Animalia
- Phylum: Arthropoda
- Class: Insecta
- Order: Lepidoptera
- Superfamily: Noctuoidea
- Family: Erebidae
- Subfamily: Arctiinae
- Genus: Amsacta
- Species: A. grammiphlebia

Binomial name
- Amsacta grammiphlebia Hampson, 1901

= Amsacta grammiphlebia =

Species of moth

Amsacta grammiphlebia is a moth of the family Erebidae. It was described by George Hampson in 1901. It is found in the Democratic Republic of the Congo, Malawi, Zambia and Zimbabwe.
