= Metarbela taifensis =

Scientific classification
- Kingdom: Animalia
- Phylum: Arthropoda
- Class: Insecta
- Order: Lepidoptera
- Family: Cossidae
- Genus: Metarbela
- Species: M. taifensis

Binomial name
- Metarbela taifensis Wiltshire, 1988

Species of moth

Metarbela taifensis is a moth in the family Cossidae. It is found in Saudi Arabia.
