= Anoba suggesta =

Scientific classification
- Kingdom: Animalia
- Phylum: Arthropoda
- Clade: Pancrustacea
- Class: Insecta
- Order: Lepidoptera
- Superfamily: Noctuoidea
- Family: Erebidae
- Genus: Anoba
- Species: A. suggesta

Binomial name
- Anoba suggesta Walker, 1858

Species of moth

Anoba suggesta is a species of moth in the family Erebidae.
