= Metarbela reticulosana =

Scientific classification
- Domain: Eukaryota
- Kingdom: Animalia
- Phylum: Arthropoda
- Class: Insecta
- Order: Lepidoptera
- Family: Cossidae
- Genus: Metarbela
- Species: M. reticulosana

Binomial name
- Metarbela reticulosana Strand, 1913

Species of moth

Metarbela reticulosana is a moth in the family Cossidae described by Embrik Strand in 1913. It is found in Cameroon and Equatorial Guinea.
