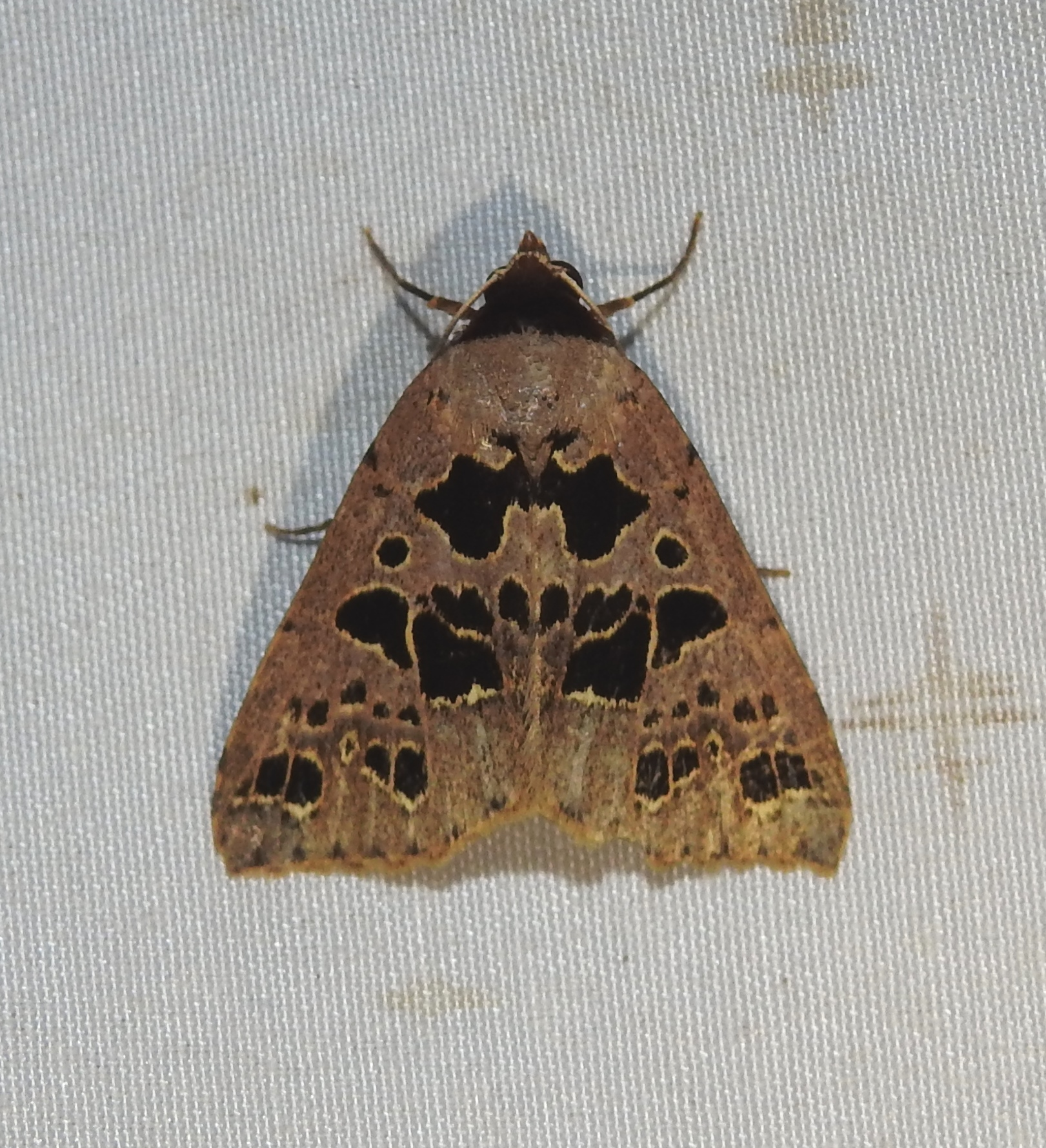

Scientific classification
- Kingdom: Animalia
- Phylum: Arthropoda
- Class: Insecta
- Order: Lepidoptera
- Superfamily: Noctuoidea
- Family: Erebidae
- Genus: Anoba
- Species: A. polyspila

Binomial name
- Anoba polyspila (Walker 1865)

Synonyms
- Athyrma polyspila Walker, 1865

= Anoba polyspila =

Species of moth

Anoba polyspila is a moth of the family Erebidae. It is found in Asia. The species is sometimes placed in the genus Bessacta Warren, 1912.
