= Metarbela pygatula =

Scientific classification
- Domain: Eukaryota
- Kingdom: Animalia
- Phylum: Arthropoda
- Class: Insecta
- Order: Lepidoptera
- Family: Cossidae
- Genus: Metarbela
- Species: M. pygatula

Binomial name
- Metarbela pygatula Strand, 1913

Species of moth

Metarbela pygatula is a moth in the family Cossidae. It is found in Equatorial Guinea.
