= Arbelodes griseata =

Scientific classification
- Domain: Eukaryota
- Kingdom: Animalia
- Phylum: Arthropoda
- Class: Insecta
- Order: Lepidoptera
- Family: Cossidae
- Genus: Arbelodes
- Species: A. griseata

Binomial name
- Arbelodes griseata (Janse, 1925)

Synonyms
- Metarbela griseata Janse, 1925

Species of moth

Arbelodes griseata is a moth in the family Cossidae. It is found in South Africa, where it has been recorded from Gauteng, the North-West Province and the Limpopo Province. The habitat consists of moist/dystrophic subtropical savannas and arid/eutrophic savannas.

The length of the forewings is about 10 mm.
