= Metarbela lornadepewae =

Scientific classification
- Kingdom: Animalia
- Phylum: Arthropoda
- Class: Insecta
- Order: Lepidoptera
- Family: Cossidae
- Genus: Metarbela
- Species: M. lornadepewae

Binomial name
- Metarbela lornadepewae Lehmann, 2009

Species of moth

Metarbela lornadepewae is a moth in the family Cossidae. It is found in Tanzania, where it has been recorded from the Udzungwa Mountains. The habitat consists of montane and upper montane forests.

The length of the forewings is about 10 mm.

== Etymology ==
The species is named for Lorna Anne Depew.
