= Micragrotis =

- Micragrotis interstriata

Scientific classification
- Kingdom: Animalia
- Phylum: Arthropoda
- Class: Insecta
- Order: Lepidoptera
- Superfamily: Noctuoidea
- Family: Noctuidae
- Subfamily: Noctuinae
- Genus: Micragrotis; Hampson, 1903

Genus of moths

Micragrotis is a genus of moths of the family Noctuidae. The genus was erected by George Hampson in 1903.

== Selected species ==
- Micragrotis lacteata Hampson, 1903
- Micragrotis puncticostata Hampson, 1902
- Micragrotis strigibasis Hampson, 1902
- Micragrotis cinerosa Bethune-Baker, 1911
- Micragrotis exusta Hampson, 1903
- Micragrotis intendens Walker, 1857
- Micragrotis interstriata Hampson, 1902
- Micragrotis marwitzi Gaede, 1935
- Micragrotis microstigma Hampson, 1903
- Micragrotis prosarca Hampson, 1903
- Micragrotis rufescens Hampson, 1903
Micragrotis lacteata

Micragrotis puncticostata
