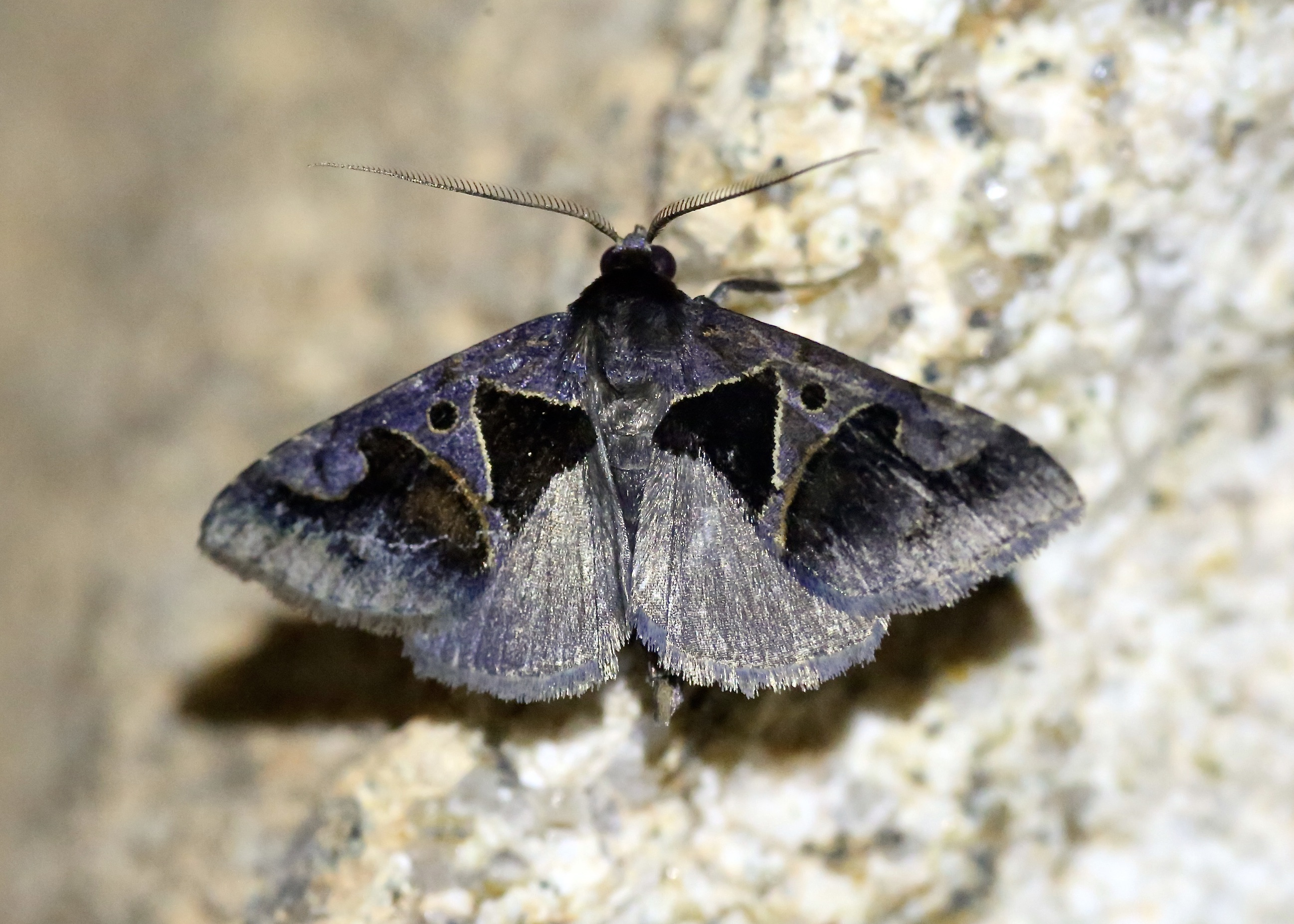
- The male from Zimbabwe highlands.

Scientific classification
- Domain: Eukaryota
- Kingdom: Animalia
- Phylum: Arthropoda
- Class: Insecta
- Order: Lepidoptera
- Superfamily: Noctuoidea
- Family: Erebidae
- Genus: Anoba
- Species: A. angulilinea

Binomial name
- Anoba angulilinea (Holland, 1894)

Synonyms
- Anoba unipuncta (Hampson, 1902)

= Anoba angulilinea =

Species of moth

Anoba angulilinea is a moth of the family Erebidae. Formerly the genus was placed in the family Noctuidae. It is found in West, Central, East, and South Africa.
