= Arbelodes mondeensis =

Scientific classification
- Domain: Eukaryota
- Kingdom: Animalia
- Phylum: Arthropoda
- Class: Insecta
- Order: Lepidoptera
- Family: Cossidae
- Genus: Arbelodes
- Species: A. mondeensis

Binomial name
- Arbelodes mondeensis Lehmann, 2010

Species of moth

Arbelodes mondeensis is a moth in the family Metarbelidae. It is found in South Africa, where it has been recorded from the Eastern Cape. The habitat consists of thickets and tree clumps.

The length of the forewings is about 8.5 mm.

== Etymology ==
The species name refers to Kleinemonde, the type locality.
