= Metarbela tuckeri =

Scientific classification
- Domain: Eukaryota
- Kingdom: Animalia
- Phylum: Arthropoda
- Class: Insecta
- Order: Lepidoptera
- Family: Cossidae
- Genus: Metarbela
- Species: M. tuckeri

Binomial name
- Metarbela tuckeri (Butler, 1875)

Synonyms
- Cryptothelea tuckeri Butler, 1875

Species of moth

Metarbela tuckeri is a moth in the family Cossidae. It is found in South Africa.
