= Metarbela dialeuca =

Scientific classification
- Kingdom: Animalia
- Phylum: Arthropoda
- Class: Insecta
- Order: Lepidoptera
- Family: Cossidae
- Genus: Metarbela
- Species: M. dialeuca

Binomial name
- Metarbela dialeuca Hampson, 1910

Species of moth

Metarbela dialeuca is a moth in the family Cossidae. It is found in Kenya, Malawi and South Africa.
