= Teragra trimaculata =

Scientific classification
- Domain: Eukaryota
- Kingdom: Animalia
- Phylum: Arthropoda
- Class: Insecta
- Order: Lepidoptera
- Family: Cossidae
- Genus: Teragra
- Species: T. trimaculata

Binomial name
- Teragra trimaculata Gaede, 1929

Species of moth

Teragra trimaculata is a moth in the family Cossidae. It is found in Kenya.
