= Arbelodes meridialis =

Scientific classification
- Domain: Eukaryota
- Kingdom: Animalia
- Phylum: Arthropoda
- Class: Insecta
- Order: Lepidoptera
- Family: Cossidae
- Genus: Arbelodes
- Species: A. meridialis

Binomial name
- Arbelodes meridialis Karsch, 1896

Synonyms
- Arbelodes meridionalis Dalla Torre & Strand, 1923

Species of moth

Arbelodes meridialis is a moth in the family Cossidae. It is found in south-eastern South Africa, where it has been recorded from the Orange Free State, the Eastern Cape and KwaZulu-Natal. The habitat consists of temperate and subtropical grasslands.

The length of the forewings is about 12 mm for males and 12.5 mm for females.
