= Teragra irvingi =

Scientific classification
- Domain: Eukaryota
- Kingdom: Animalia
- Phylum: Arthropoda
- Class: Insecta
- Order: Lepidoptera
- Family: Cossidae
- Genus: Teragra
- Species: T. irvingi

Binomial name
- Teragra irvingi Janse, 1925

Species of moth

Teragra irvingi is a moth in the family Cossidae. It is found in South Africa.
