= Anoba hamifera =

Scientific classification
- Kingdom: Animalia
- Phylum: Arthropoda
- Clade: Pancrustacea
- Class: Insecta
- Order: Lepidoptera
- Superfamily: Noctuoidea
- Family: Erebidae
- Genus: Anoba
- Species: A. hamifera

Binomial name
- Anoba hamifera Hampson, 1902

Species of moth

Anoba hamifera is a species of moth in the family Erebidae. It is found in Africa, including South Africa, Eswatini, and Mozambique.
