= Teragra althodes =

Scientific classification
- Kingdom: Animalia
- Phylum: Arthropoda
- Class: Insecta
- Order: Lepidoptera
- Family: Cossidae
- Genus: Teragra
- Species: T. althodes

Binomial name
- Teragra althodes Hampson, 1920

Species of moth

Teragra althodes is a moth in the family Cossidae. It is found in South Africa.
