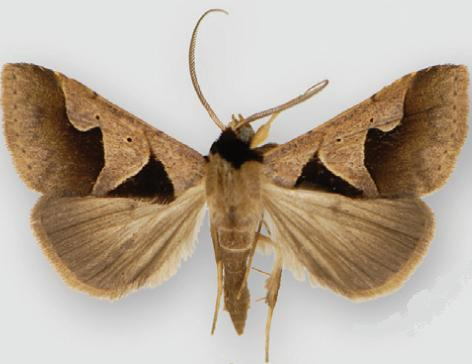
- Male
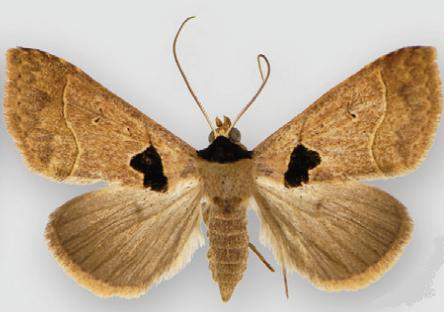
- Female

Scientific classification
- Kingdom: Animalia
- Phylum: Arthropoda
- Clade: Pancrustacea
- Class: Insecta
- Order: Lepidoptera
- Superfamily: Noctuoidea
- Family: Erebidae
- Genus: Anoba
- Species: A. trigonoides

Binomial name
- Anoba trigonoides Walker, 1858

= Anoba trigonoides =

Species of moth

Anoba trigonoides is a species of moth of the family Erebidae. It is found in South America and Central America, including Costa Rica, Paraguay and Brazil.
