= Arbelodes collaris =

Scientific classification
- Domain: Eukaryota
- Kingdom: Animalia
- Phylum: Arthropoda
- Class: Insecta
- Order: Lepidoptera
- Family: Cossidae
- Genus: Arbelodes
- Species: A. collaris

Binomial name
- Arbelodes collaris Aurivillius, 1921

Species of moth

Arbelodes collaris is a moth in the family Cossidae. It is found in South Africa, where it has been recorded from the Limpopo Province. The habitat consists of legume-dominated woodland.

The length of the forewings is about 12 mm.
