= Drepanogynis protactosema =

Scientific classification
- Kingdom: Animalia
- Phylum: Arthropoda
- Clade: Pancrustacea
- Class: Insecta
- Order: Lepidoptera
- Family: Geometridae
- Genus: Drepanogynis
- Species: D. protactosema

Binomial name
- Drepanogynis protactosema Prout, 1932

Synonyms
- Derrioides protactosema Prout, 1932

Species of moth

Drepanogynis protactosema is a species of moth of the family Geometridae. It is found in North & East Madagascar.

The wingspan of this species is 32–34 mm. The forewings are rather elongated, pallid purple or more violaceous, with quite sparse blackish irroration. The costal edge is narrowly reddish.
