= Metarbela latifasciata =

Scientific classification
- Domain: Eukaryota
- Kingdom: Animalia
- Phylum: Arthropoda
- Class: Insecta
- Order: Lepidoptera
- Family: Cossidae
- Genus: Metarbela
- Species: M. latifasciata

Binomial name
- Metarbela latifasciata Gaede, 1929

Species of moth

Metarbela latifasciata is a moth in the family Cossidae. It is found in Kenya and Tanzania.
