= Anoba malagasy =

Scientific classification
- Kingdom: Animalia
- Phylum: Arthropoda
- Clade: Pancrustacea
- Class: Insecta
- Order: Lepidoptera
- Superfamily: Noctuoidea
- Family: Erebidae
- Genus: Anoba
- Species: A. malagasy

Binomial name
- Anoba malagasy Viette, 1970

Species of moth

Anoba malagasy is a species of moth in the family Erebidae. It is found in Madagascar.
