= Metarbela diodonta =

Scientific classification
- Kingdom: Animalia
- Phylum: Arthropoda
- Class: Insecta
- Order: Lepidoptera
- Family: Cossidae
- Genus: Metarbela
- Species: M. diodonta

Binomial name
- Metarbela diodonta Hampson, 1916

Species of moth

Metarbela diodonta is a moth in the family Cossidae. It is found in Kenya.
