= Micragrotis exusta =

Scientific classification
- Kingdom: Animalia
- Phylum: Arthropoda
- Class: Insecta
- Order: Lepidoptera
- Superfamily: Noctuoidea
- Family: Noctuidae
- Genus: Micragrotis
- Species: M. exusta

Binomial name
- Micragrotis exusta Hampson, 1903

Species of moth

Micragrotis exusta is a species of moth of the family Noctuidae first described by George Hampson in 1903. It is found in Africa, including South Africa.
