= Anoba serpens =

Scientific classification
- Kingdom: Animalia
- Phylum: Arthropoda
- Clade: Pancrustacea
- Class: Insecta
- Order: Lepidoptera
- Superfamily: Noctuoidea
- Family: Erebidae
- Genus: Anoba
- Species: A. serpens

Binomial name
- Anoba serpens Schaus, 1914

Species of moth

Anoba serpens is a species of moth in the family Erebidae. It is found in South America, including French Guiana.
