= Amsacta latimarginalis =

Scientific classification
- Kingdom: Animalia
- Phylum: Arthropoda
- Class: Insecta
- Order: Lepidoptera
- Superfamily: Noctuoidea
- Family: Erebidae
- Subfamily: Arctiinae
- Genus: Amsacta
- Species: A. latimarginalis

Binomial name
- Amsacta latimarginalis Rothschild, 1933

Species of moth

Amsacta latimarginalis is a moth of the family Erebidae. It was described by Rothschild in 1933. It is found in the Central African Republic, Ghana, Malawi, Nigeria, Sierra Leone and Sudan.

== Subspecies ==
- Amsacta latimarginalis latimarginalis (Central African Republic, Sudan)
- Amsacta latimarginalis elongata Rothschild, 1933 (Malawi)
