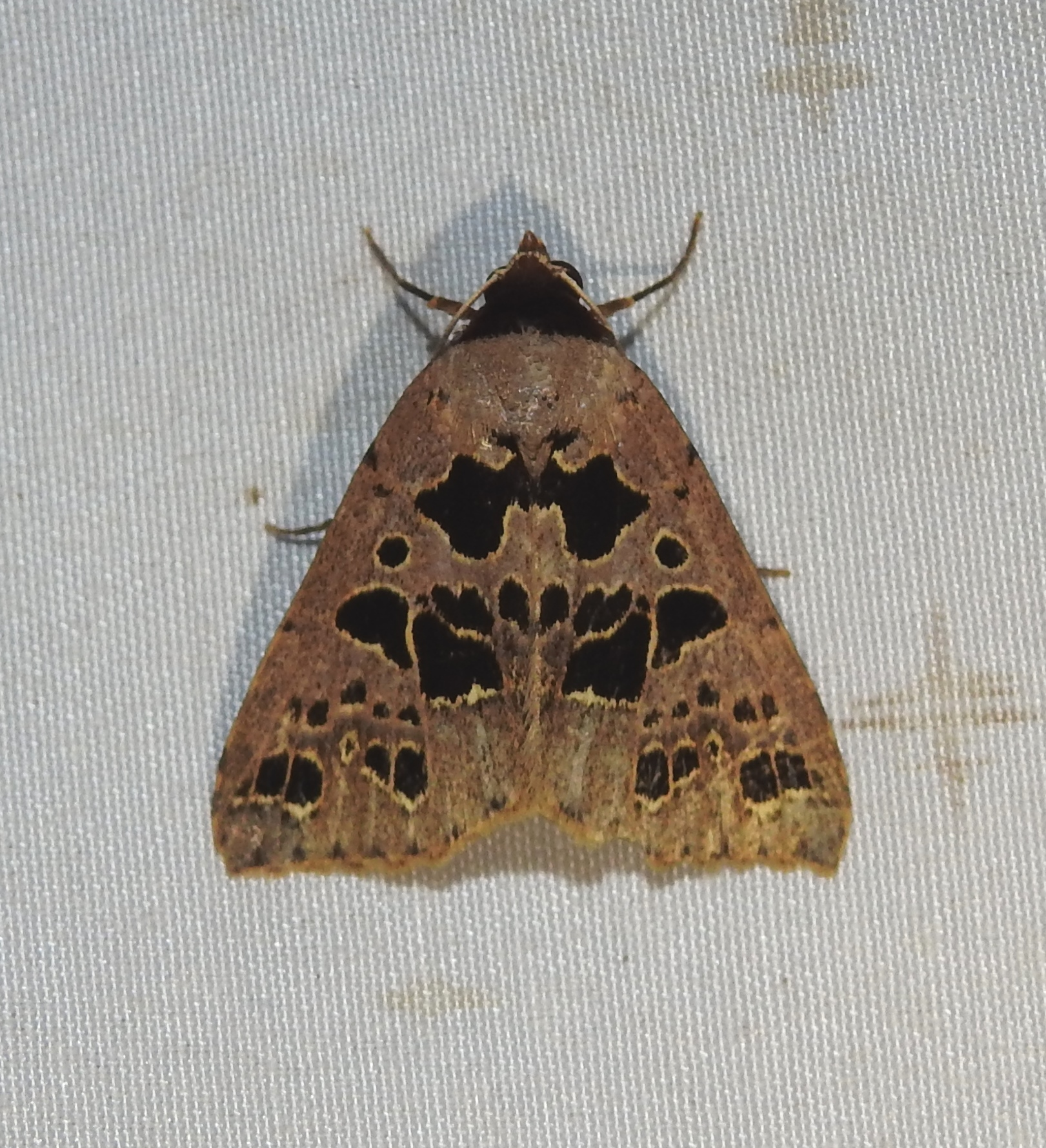
- Anoba polyspila

Scientific classification
- Kingdom: Animalia
- Phylum: Arthropoda
- Clade: Pancrustacea
- Class: Insecta
- Order: Lepidoptera
- Superfamily: Noctuoidea
- Family: Erebidae
- Subfamily: Anobinae
- Genus: Anoba; Walker, 1858

Synonyms
- Onoba Walker, 1858; Arctinia Möschler, 1880; Baxagha Walker, 1865; Bessacta Warren, 1912; Galapha Walker, 1858 (preocc.); Tephrias Wallengren, 1860

= Anoba =

Genus of moths

Anoba is a genus of moths of the family Erebidae. The genus was previously classified in the subfamily Calpinae of the family Noctuidae, but now is classified as part of the subfamily Anobinae, of which Anoba is the type genus.

== Species ==
- Anoba angulilinea (Holland 1894)
- Anoba atriplaga (Walker 1858)
- Anoba atripuncta (Hampson 1902)
- Anoba biangulata (Walker 1869)
- Anoba carcassoni (Berio 1971)
- Anoba cowani (Viette 1966)
- Anoba disjuncta (Walker 1865)
- Anoba dujardini (Viette 1970)
- Anoba endophaea (Hampson 1926)
- Anoba excurvata (Gaede 1939)
- Anoba firmalis (Guenée 1854)
- Anoba flavilinea (Hampson 1926)
- Anoba glyphica (Bethune-Baker 1911)
- Anoba gobar (Druce 1898)
- Anoba haga (Schaus 1912)
- Anoba hamifera (Hampson 1902)
- Anoba herceus (Schaus 1914)
- Anoba jaculifera (Holland 1894)
- Anoba kampfi (Berio 1971)
- Anoba ligondesi (Viette 1970)
- Anoba lunifera (Hampson 1894)
- Anoba malagasy (Viette 1970)
- Anoba mexicana (Walker 1865)
- Anoba microloba (Hampson 1926)
- Anoba microphaea (Hampson 1926)
- Anoba muffula (Guenée 1852)
- Anoba nigribasis (Holland 1894)
- Anoba noda (Swinhoe 1899)
- Anoba ovalis (Rothschild, 1917)
- Anoba pectinata (Hampson 1896)
- Anoba phaeotermesia (Hampson 1926)
- Anoba piriformis (Gaede 1939)
- Anoba plumipes (Wallengren 1860)
- Anoba polyspila (Walker 1865)
- Anoba praeusta (Herrich-Schäffer 1868)
- Anoba rigida (Swinhoe 1895)
- Anoba rufitermina (Hampson 1926)
- Anoba serpens (Schaus 1914)
- Anoba sinuata (Fabricius 1775)
- Anoba socotrensis (Hampson 1926)
- Anoba subatriplaga (D. S. Fletcher & Viette 1955)
- Anoba suffusa (Hampson 1924)
- Anoba suggesta (Walker 1858)
- Anoba tessellata (Moore 1867)
- Anoba triangularis (Warnecke 1938)
- Anoba triangulifera (Dognin 1912)
- Anoba trigonoides (Walker 1858)
- Anoba trigonosema (Hampson 1916)
- Anoba turlini (Viette 1970)
- Anoba uncifera (Hampson 1926)
- Anoba viossati (Viette 1970)
