= Metarbela rufa =

Scientific classification
- Kingdom: Animalia
- Phylum: Arthropoda
- Class: Insecta
- Order: Lepidoptera
- Family: Cossidae
- Genus: Metarbela
- Species: M. rufa

Binomial name
- Metarbela rufa Gaede, 1929

Species of moth

Metarbela rufa is a moth in the family Cossidae. It is found in Cameroon.
