= Arbelodes agassizi =

Scientific classification
- Domain: Eukaryota
- Kingdom: Animalia
- Phylum: Arthropoda
- Class: Insecta
- Order: Lepidoptera
- Family: Cossidae
- Genus: Arbelodes
- Species: A. agassizi

Binomial name
- Arbelodes agassizi Lehmann, 2010

Species of moth

Arbelodes agassizi is a moth in the family Cossidae. It is found in South Africa, where it has been recorded from the Cederberg.

== Etymology ==
The species is named for Dr David Agassiz.

== Description ==
The forewing length is 10 mm (0.39 in).
