= Agylloides =

Scientific classification
- Domain: Eukaryota
- Kingdom: Animalia
- Phylum: Arthropoda
- Class: Insecta
- Order: Lepidoptera
- Superfamily: Noctuoidea
- Family: Erebidae
- Subfamily: Arctiinae
- Tribe: Lithosiini
- Genus: Agylloides; Strand, 1912

Genus of moths

Agylloides is a genus of moths in the subfamily Arctiinae. The genus was described by Strand in 1912.

== Species ==
- Agylloides asurella Strand, 1912
- Agylloides problematica Strand, 1912
