= Arbelodes shimonii =

Scientific classification
- Domain: Eukaryota
- Kingdom: Animalia
- Phylum: Arthropoda
- Class: Insecta
- Order: Lepidoptera
- Family: Cossidae
- Genus: Arbelodes
- Species: A. shimonii

Binomial name
- Arbelodes shimonii Lehmann, 2010

Synonyms
- Metarbela iridescens Janse, 1925

Species of moth

Arbelodes shimonii is a moth in the family Cossidae. It is found in South Africa, where it has been recorded from the Cederberg. The habitat consists of submontane and montane woody riparian areas.

The length of the forewings is about 12 mm.

== Etymology ==
The species is named for Shimoni Lehmann, the son of the author.
