= Metarbela rava =

Scientific classification
- Domain: Eukaryota
- Kingdom: Animalia
- Phylum: Arthropoda
- Class: Insecta
- Order: Lepidoptera
- Family: Cossidae
- Genus: Metarbela
- Species: M. rava

Binomial name
- Metarbela rava Karsch, 1896

Species of moth

Metarbela rava is a moth in the family Cossidae. It is found in Cameroon and Uganda.

The larvae feed on Macaranga species.
