= Arbelodes kruegeri =

Scientific classification
- Domain: Eukaryota
- Kingdom: Animalia
- Phylum: Arthropoda
- Class: Insecta
- Order: Lepidoptera
- Family: Cossidae
- Genus: Arbelodes
- Species: A. kruegeri

Binomial name
- Arbelodes kruegeri Lehmann, 2010

Species of moth

Arbelodes kruegeri is a moth in the family Metarbelidae. It is found in South Africa, where it has been recorded from the Cederberg. The habitat consists of submontane and montane woody riparian areas.

The length of the forewings is about 13 mm.

== Etymology ==
The species is named for Dr Martin Krüger.
