= Anoba microloba =

Scientific classification
- Kingdom: Animalia
- Phylum: Arthropoda
- Clade: Pancrustacea
- Class: Insecta
- Order: Lepidoptera
- Superfamily: Noctuoidea
- Family: Erebidae
- Genus: Anoba
- Species: A. microloba

Binomial name
- Anoba microloba Hampson, 1926

Species of moth

Anoba microloba is a species of moth in the family Erebidae. It is found in Africa, including Eswatini and Malawi.
