= Metarbela cinereolimbata =

Scientific classification
- Kingdom: Animalia
- Phylum: Arthropoda
- Class: Insecta
- Order: Lepidoptera
- Family: Cossidae
- Genus: Metarbela
- Species: M. cinereolimbata

Binomial name
- Metarbela cinereolimbata Le Cerf, 1914

Species of moth

Metarbela cinereolimbata is a moth in the family Cossidae. It is found in Kenya.
