= Metarbela cremorna =

Scientific classification
- Kingdom: Animalia
- Phylum: Arthropoda
- Class: Insecta
- Order: Lepidoptera
- Family: Cossidae
- Genus: Metarbela
- Species: M. cremorna

Binomial name
- Metarbela cremorna Hampson, 1920

Species of moth

Metarbela cremorna is a moth in the family Cossidae. It is found in Ghana.
