= Metarbela sphacobapta =

Scientific classification
- Kingdom: Animalia
- Phylum: Arthropoda
- Clade: Pancrustacea
- Class: Insecta
- Order: Lepidoptera
- Family: Cossidae
- Genus: Metarbela
- Species: M. sphacobapta

Binomial name
- Metarbela sphacobapta Tams, 1929

Species of moth

Metarbela sphacobapta is a moth in the family Cossidae. It is found in Angola.
