= Teragra simplicius =

Scientific classification
- Domain: Eukaryota
- Kingdom: Animalia
- Phylum: Arthropoda
- Class: Insecta
- Order: Lepidoptera
- Family: Cossidae
- Genus: Teragra
- Species: T. simplicius

Binomial name
- Teragra simplicius Le Cerf, 1922

Species of moth

Teragra simplicius is a moth in the family Cossidae. It is found in Kenya.
