= Anoba firmalis =

Scientific classification
- Kingdom: Animalia
- Phylum: Arthropoda
- Clade: Pancrustacea
- Class: Insecta
- Order: Lepidoptera
- Superfamily: Noctuoidea
- Family: Erebidae
- Genus: Anoba
- Species: A. firmalis

Binomial name
- Anoba firmalis Guenée, 1854

Species of moth

Anoba firmalis is a species of moth in the family Erebidae. It is found in French Guiana.
