= Micragrotis lacteata =

Scientific classification
- Kingdom: Animalia
- Phylum: Arthropoda
- Class: Insecta
- Order: Lepidoptera
- Superfamily: Noctuoidea
- Family: Noctuidae
- Genus: Micragrotis
- Species: M. lacteata

Binomial name
- Micragrotis lacteata Hampson, 1903

Species of moth

Micragrotis lacteata is a species of moth of the family Noctuidae. It is found in Africa, including Kenya.
