= Metarbela costistrigata =

Scientific classification
- Kingdom: Animalia
- Phylum: Arthropoda
- Class: Insecta
- Order: Lepidoptera
- Family: Cossidae
- Genus: Metarbela
- Species: M. costistrigata

Binomial name
- Metarbela costistrigata Hampson, 1920

Species of moth

Metarbela costistrigata is a moth in the family Cossidae. It is found in South Africa.
