= Teragra guttifera =

Scientific classification
- Kingdom: Animalia
- Phylum: Arthropoda
- Clade: Pancrustacea
- Class: Insecta
- Order: Lepidoptera
- Family: Cossidae
- Genus: Teragra
- Species: T. guttifera

Binomial name
- Teragra guttifera Hampson, 1910

Species of moth

Teragra guttifera is a moth in the family Cossidae. It is found in South Africa.
