= Arbelodes kroonae =

Scientific classification
- Domain: Eukaryota
- Kingdom: Animalia
- Phylum: Arthropoda
- Class: Insecta
- Order: Lepidoptera
- Family: Cossidae
- Genus: Arbelodes
- Species: A. kroonae

Binomial name
- Arbelodes kroonae Lehmann, 2007

Species of moth

Arbelodes kroonae is a moth in the family Cossidae. It is found in south-eastern Namibia, where it has been recorded from the Richtersberg Mountain Desert. The habitat consists of submontane and montane areas.
