= Arbelodes haberlandorum =

Scientific classification
- Domain: Eukaryota
- Kingdom: Animalia
- Phylum: Arthropoda
- Class: Insecta
- Order: Lepidoptera
- Family: Cossidae
- Genus: Arbelodes
- Species: A. haberlandorum

Binomial name
- Arbelodes haberlandorum Lehmann, 2010

Species of moth

Arbelodes haberlandorum is a moth in the family Metarbelidae. It is found in South Africa, where it has been recorded from the Cederberg. The habitat consists of submontane and montane riparian areas.

The length of the forewings is about 11 mm.

== Etymology ==
The species is named for the grandparents of the author.
