= Amsacta duberneti =

Scientific classification
- Kingdom: Animalia
- Phylum: Arthropoda
- Class: Insecta
- Order: Lepidoptera
- Superfamily: Noctuoidea
- Family: Erebidae
- Subfamily: Arctiinae
- Genus: Amsacta
- Species: A. duberneti

Binomial name
- Amsacta duberneti Toulgoët, 1968

Species of moth

Amsacta duberneti is a moth of the family Erebidae. It was described by Hervé de Toulgoët in 1968. It is found on Madagascar.
