= Arbelodes franziskae =

Scientific classification
- Domain: Eukaryota
- Kingdom: Animalia
- Phylum: Arthropoda
- Class: Insecta
- Order: Lepidoptera
- Family: Cossidae
- Genus: Arbelodes
- Species: A. franziskae

Binomial name
- Arbelodes franziskae Lehmann, 2010

Species of moth

Arbelodes franziskae is a moth in the family Cossidae. It is found in South Africa, where it has been recorded from the Cederberg. The habitat consists of submontane and montane woody riparian areas.

The length of the forewings is about 9 mm.
