= Teragra umbrifera =

Scientific classification
- Kingdom: Animalia
- Phylum: Arthropoda
- Clade: Pancrustacea
- Class: Insecta
- Order: Lepidoptera
- Family: Cossidae
- Genus: Teragra
- Species: T. umbrifera

Binomial name
- Teragra umbrifera Hampson, 1910

Species of moth

Teragra umbrifera is a moth in the family Cossidae. It is found in Sierra Leone.
