= Arbelodes varii =

Scientific classification
- Domain: Eukaryota
- Kingdom: Animalia
- Phylum: Arthropoda
- Class: Insecta
- Order: Lepidoptera
- Family: Cossidae
- Genus: Arbelodes
- Species: A. varii

Binomial name
- Arbelodes varii Lehmann, 2010

Species of moth

Arbelodes varii is a moth in the family Cossidae. It is found in South Africa, where it has been recorded from the Western Cape Province.
