= Anoba plumipes =

Scientific classification
- Kingdom: Animalia
- Phylum: Arthropoda
- Clade: Pancrustacea
- Class: Insecta
- Order: Lepidoptera
- Superfamily: Noctuoidea
- Family: Erebidae
- Genus: Anoba
- Species: A. plumipes

Binomial name
- Anoba plumipes Wallengren, 1860

Species of moth

Anoba plumipes is a species of moth in the family Erebidae. It is found in Africa, including South Africa, Eswatini, and Mozambique.
