= Micragrotis interstriata =

Scientific classification
- Kingdom: Animalia
- Phylum: Arthropoda
- Class: Insecta
- Order: Lepidoptera
- Superfamily: Noctuoidea
- Family: Noctuidae
- Genus: Micragrotis
- Species: M. interstriata

Binomial name
- Micragrotis interstriata Hampson, 1902

Synonyms
- Agrotis interstriata Hampson, 1902

Species of moth

Micragrotis interstriata is a species of moth of the family Noctuidae first described by George Hampson in 1902. It is found in Africa, including Zimbabwe and South Africa.
