= Metarbela abdulrahmani =

Scientific classification
- Kingdom: Animalia
- Phylum: Arthropoda
- Class: Insecta
- Order: Lepidoptera
- Family: Cossidae
- Genus: Metarbela
- Species: M. abdulrahmani

Binomial name
- Metarbela abdulrahmani Lehmann, 2008

Species of moth

Metarbela abdulrahmani is a moth in the family Cossidae. It is found in Tanzania, where it has been recorded from the East Usambara Mountains. The habitat consists of submontane forests.

The length of the forewings is about 15 mm.

== Etymology ==
The species is named for Matano Abdulrahman of the Coastal Forest Conservation Unit.
