= Micragrotis marwitzi =

Scientific classification
- Domain: Eukaryota
- Kingdom: Animalia
- Phylum: Arthropoda
- Class: Insecta
- Order: Lepidoptera
- Superfamily: Noctuoidea
- Family: Noctuidae
- Genus: Micragrotis
- Species: M. marwitzi

Binomial name
- Micragrotis marwitzi Gaede, 1935

Species of moth

Micragrotis marwitzi is a species of moth of the family Noctuidae first described by Max Gaede in 1935. It is found in Africa, including South Africa.
