= Teragra punctana =

Scientific classification
- Kingdom: Animalia
- Phylum: Arthropoda
- Clade: Pancrustacea
- Class: Insecta
- Order: Lepidoptera
- Family: Cossidae
- Genus: Teragra
- Species: T. punctana

Binomial name
- Teragra punctana Mey, 2011

Species of moth

Teragra punctana is a moth in the family Cossidae. It is found in South Africa.
