= Arbelodes goellnerae =

Scientific classification
- Kingdom: Animalia
- Phylum: Arthropoda
- Clade: Pancrustacea
- Class: Insecta
- Order: Lepidoptera
- Family: Cossidae
- Genus: Arbelodes
- Species: A. goellnerae

Binomial name
- Arbelodes goellnerae Mey, 2012

Species of moth

Arbelodes goellnerae is a moth in the family Cossidae. It is found in southern Namibia.
