= Arbelodes claudiae =

Scientific classification
- Domain: Eukaryota
- Kingdom: Animalia
- Phylum: Arthropoda
- Class: Insecta
- Order: Lepidoptera
- Family: Cossidae
- Genus: Arbelodes
- Species: A. claudiae

Binomial name
- Arbelodes claudiae Lehmann, 2010

Species of moth

Arbelodes claudiae is a moth in the family Cossidae. It is found in northern Malawi and north-eastern Zambia. The habitat consists of Juniperus forests and legume-dominated miombo.

The length of the forewings is about 11 mm for males and 14 mm for females.

== Etymology ==
The species is named for Dr Claudia Meyer.
