= Arbelodes flavicolor =

Scientific classification
- Domain: Eukaryota
- Kingdom: Animalia
- Phylum: Arthropoda
- Class: Insecta
- Order: Lepidoptera
- Family: Cossidae
- Genus: Arbelodes
- Species: A. flavicolor

Binomial name
- Arbelodes flavicolor (Janse, 1925)

Synonyms
- Metarbela flavicolor Janse, 1925

Species of moth

Arbelodes flavicolor is a moth in the family Cossidae. It is found in south-eastern South Africa, where it has been recorded from the Impetyeni Forest in the Eastern Cape and KwaZulu-Natal.
