= Arbelodes heringi =

Scientific classification
- Domain: Eukaryota
- Kingdom: Animalia
- Phylum: Arthropoda
- Class: Insecta
- Order: Lepidoptera
- Family: Cossidae
- Genus: Arbelodes
- Species: A. heringi

Binomial name
- Arbelodes heringi (Janse, 1930)

Synonyms
- Metarbela heringi Janse, 1930

Species of moth

Arbelodes heringi is a moth in the family Cossidae. It is found in Namibia, where it has been recorded from Windhoek. The habitat consists of montane wooded grasslands.

The length of the forewings is about 10 mm.
