= Metarbela simillima =

Scientific classification
- Kingdom: Animalia
- Phylum: Arthropoda
- Class: Insecta
- Order: Lepidoptera
- Family: Cossidae
- Genus: Metarbela
- Species: M. simillima

Binomial name
- Metarbela simillima (Hampson, 1910)

Synonyms
- Teragra simillima Hampson, 1910

Species of moth

Metarbela simillima is a moth in the family Cossidae. It is found in Kenya and Uganda.
