= Agylloides asurella =

Scientific classification
- Domain: Eukaryota
- Kingdom: Animalia
- Phylum: Arthropoda
- Class: Insecta
- Order: Lepidoptera
- Superfamily: Noctuoidea
- Family: Erebidae
- Subfamily: Arctiinae
- Genus: Agylloides
- Species: A. asurella

Binomial name
- Agylloides asurella Strand, 1912

Synonyms
- Agylloides asurella ab. obscurella Strand, 1912

Species of moth

Agylloides asurella is a moth of the subfamily Arctiinae. It was described by Strand in 1912. It is found in Ghana and Togo.
