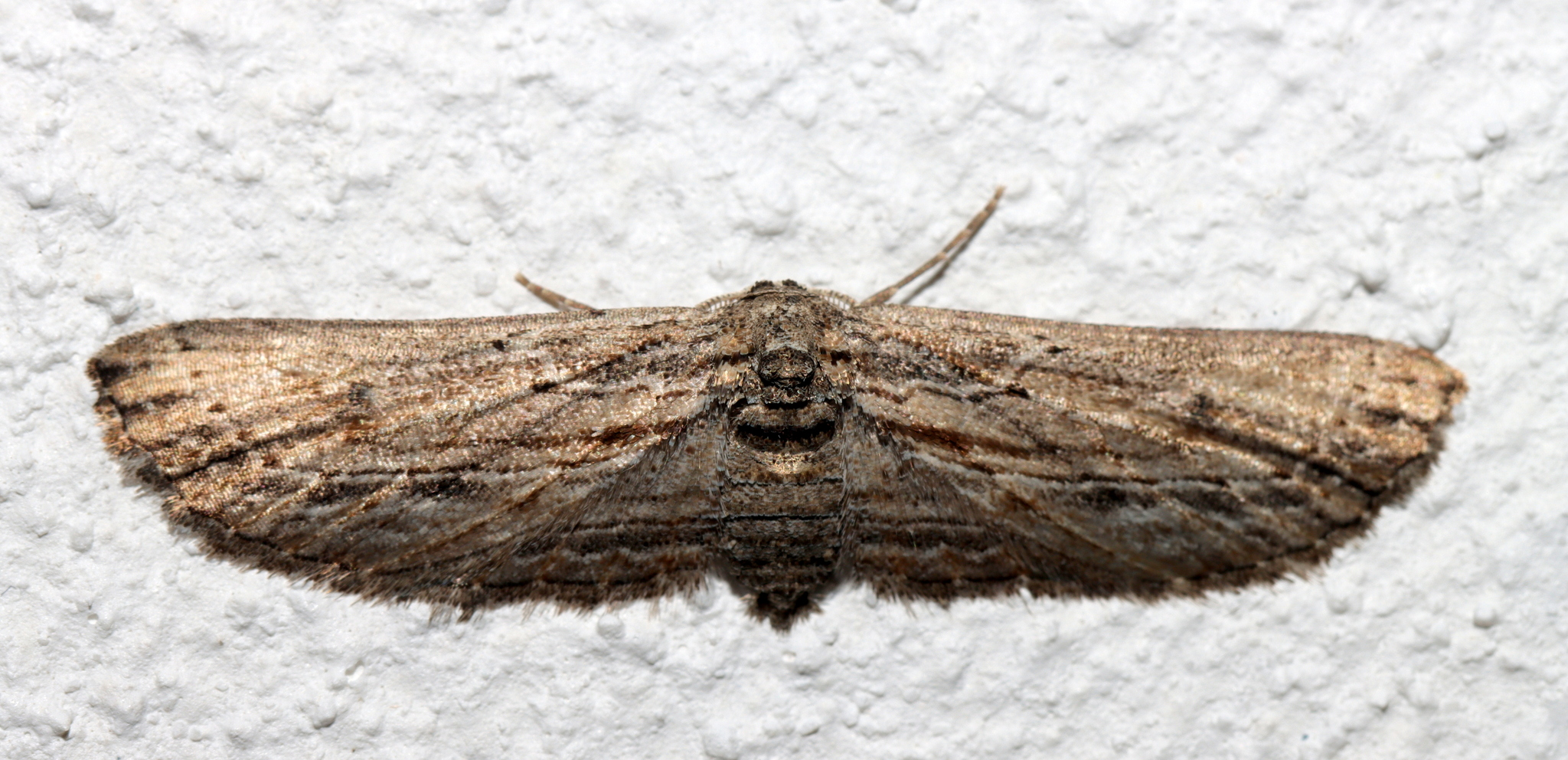
- Hebdomophruda confusatrix

Scientific classification
- Kingdom: Animalia
- Phylum: Arthropoda
- Class: Insecta
- Order: Lepidoptera
- Family: Geometridae
- Genus: Hebdomophruda; Warren, 1897

Synonyms
- Hedromophruda (lapsus); Stenoptilotis Warren, 1914

= Hebdomophruda =

Genus of moths

Hebdomophruda is a genus of moths in the family Geometridae.

== Species ==
The following species are recognised in the genus Hebdomophruda:

- Hebdomophruda apicata Warren, 1897
- Hebdomophruda complicatrix Krüger, 1998
- Hebdomophruda confusatrix Krüger, 1998
- Hebdomophruda crassipuncta Krüger, 1997
- Hebdomophruda crenilinea Prout, 1917
- Hebdomophruda curvilinea Warren, 1897
- Hebdomophruda diploschema Prout, 1915
- Hebdomophruda disconnecta Krüger, 1997
- Hebdomophruda endroedyi Krüger, 1998
- Hebdomophruda errans Prout, 1917
- Hebdomophruda eupitheciata (Warren, 1914)
- Hebdomophruda hamata Krüger, 1997
- Hebdomophruda imitatrix Krüger, 1998
- Hebdomophruda irritatrix Krüger, 1998
- Hebdomophruda kekonimena Krüger, 1997
- Hebdomophruda nigroviridis Krüger, 1997
- Hebdomophruda ortholinea Krüger, 1998
- Hebdomophruda sculpta Janse, 1932
- Hebdomophruda southeyae Krüger, 1997
- Hebdomophruda tephrinata Krüger, 1997
