= Amsacta fuscosa =

Scientific classification
- Kingdom: Animalia
- Phylum: Arthropoda
- Class: Insecta
- Order: Lepidoptera
- Superfamily: Noctuoidea
- Family: Erebidae
- Subfamily: Arctiinae
- Genus: Amsacta
- Species: A. fuscosa

Binomial name
- Amsacta fuscosa (Bartel, 1903)

Synonyms
- Acantharctia fuscosa Bartel, 1903

Species of moth

Amsacta fuscosa is a moth of the family Erebidae. It was described by Max Bartel in 1903. It is found in Ghana and Togo.
