= Arbelodes iridescens =

Scientific classification
- Domain: Eukaryota
- Kingdom: Animalia
- Phylum: Arthropoda
- Class: Insecta
- Order: Lepidoptera
- Family: Cossidae
- Genus: Arbelodes
- Species: A. iridescens

Binomial name
- Arbelodes iridescens (Janse, 1925)

Synonyms
- Metarbela iridescens Janse, 1925

Species of moth

Arbelodes iridescens is a moth in the family Cossidae. It is found in north-eastern South Africa, where it has been recorded from Gauteng and Mpumalanga. The habitat consists of Afromontane forests and thickets.

The length of the forewings is about 12.5 mm.
