= Metarbela fumida =

Scientific classification
- Domain: Eukaryota
- Kingdom: Animalia
- Phylum: Arthropoda
- Class: Insecta
- Order: Lepidoptera
- Family: Cossidae
- Genus: Metarbela
- Species: M. fumida

Binomial name
- Metarbela fumida Karsch, 1896

Species of moth

Metarbela fumida is a moth in the family Cossidae. It is found in Togo.
