= Anoba biangulata =

Scientific classification
- Kingdom: Animalia
- Phylum: Arthropoda
- Clade: Pancrustacea
- Class: Insecta
- Order: Lepidoptera
- Superfamily: Noctuoidea
- Family: Erebidae
- Genus: Anoba
- Species: A. biangulata

Binomial name
- Anoba biangulata Walker, 1869

Species of moth

Anoba biangulata is a species of moth in the family Erebidae. It is found in Africa, including Uganda, Cameroon, and Ghana.
