= Amsacta marginalis =

Scientific classification
- Kingdom: Animalia
- Phylum: Arthropoda
- Class: Insecta
- Order: Lepidoptera
- Superfamily: Noctuoidea
- Family: Erebidae
- Subfamily: Arctiinae
- Genus: Amsacta
- Species: A. marginalis

Binomial name
- Amsacta marginalis Walker, 1855

Species of moth

Amsacta marginalis is a moth of the family Erebidae. It was described by Francis Walker in 1855. It is found in Ghana, Malawi, Nigeria, Sierra Leone and Togo.
