= Metarbela onusta =

Scientific classification
- Kingdom: Animalia
- Phylum: Arthropoda
- Clade: Pancrustacea
- Class: Insecta
- Order: Lepidoptera
- Family: Cossidae
- Genus: Metarbela
- Species: M. onusta

Binomial name
- Metarbela onusta Karsch, 1896

Species of moth

Metarbela onusta is a moth in the family Cossidae. It is found in Guinea and Togo.
