= Amsacta flavicostata =

Scientific classification
- Kingdom: Animalia
- Phylum: Arthropoda
- Class: Insecta
- Order: Lepidoptera
- Superfamily: Noctuoidea
- Family: Erebidae
- Subfamily: Arctiinae
- Genus: Amsacta
- Species: A. flavicostata

Binomial name
- Amsacta flavicostata (Gaede, 1916)

Synonyms
- Acantharctia flavicostata Gaede, 1916; Acantharctia flavicostata var. baumanni Gaede, 1916

Species of moth

Amsacta flavicostata is a moth of the family Erebidae. It was described by Max Gaede in 1916. It is found in Cameroon and Togo.
