= Arbelodes deprinsi =

Scientific classification
- Domain: Eukaryota
- Kingdom: Animalia
- Phylum: Arthropoda
- Class: Insecta
- Order: Lepidoptera
- Family: Cossidae
- Genus: Arbelodes
- Species: A. deprinsi

Binomial name
- Arbelodes deprinsi Lehmann, 2010

Species of moth

Arbelodes deprinsi is a moth in the family Cossidae. It is found in South Africa, where it has been recorded from the forest-grassland mosaic of the Dragon Peaks Mountain Resort.

The length of the forewings is about 15 mm.
