= Euxoa crassilinea =

Scientific classification
- Kingdom: Animalia
- Phylum: Arthropoda
- Class: Insecta
- Order: Lepidoptera
- Superfamily: Noctuoidea
- Family: Noctuidae
- Genus: Euxoa
- Species: E. crassilinea

Binomial name
- Euxoa crassilinea (Wallengren, 1860)

Synonyms
- Agrotis crassilinea Wallengren, 1860

Species of moth

Euxoa crassilinea is a moth of the family Noctuidae first described by Hans Daniel Johan Wallengren in 1860. It is found in South Africa.
