= Micragrotis strigibasis =

Scientific classification
- Kingdom: Animalia
- Phylum: Arthropoda
- Class: Insecta
- Order: Lepidoptera
- Superfamily: Noctuoidea
- Family: Noctuidae
- Genus: Micragrotis
- Species: M. strigibasis

Binomial name
- Micragrotis strigibasis Hampson, 1902

Species of moth

Micragrotis strigibasis is a species of moth of the family Noctuidae first described by George Hampson in 1902. It is found in Africa, including South Africa.
