= Metarbela cymaphora =

Scientific classification
- Kingdom: Animalia
- Phylum: Arthropoda
- Class: Insecta
- Order: Lepidoptera
- Family: Cossidae
- Genus: Metarbela
- Species: M. cymaphora

Binomial name
- Metarbela cymaphora Hampson, 1910

Synonyms
- Teragra neurosticta Hampson, 1910

Species of moth

Metarbela cymaphora is a moth in the family Cossidae. It is found in Angola, South Africa and Zimbabwe.
