= Arbelodes sticticosta =

Scientific classification
- Kingdom: Animalia
- Phylum: Arthropoda
- Class: Insecta
- Order: Lepidoptera
- Family: Cossidae
- Genus: Arbelodes
- Species: A. sticticosta

Binomial name
- Arbelodes sticticosta (Hampson, 1910)

Synonyms
- Teragra sticticosta Hampson, 1910; Metarbela sticticosta; Metarbelodes sticticosta

Species of moth

Arbelodes sticticosta is a moth in the family Cossidae. It is found in south-eastern South Africa, where it has been recorded from the northern Eastern Cape Province, KwaZulu-Natal and Mpumalanga.

The length of the forewings is about 15 mm.
