= Hermann Dewitz =

German lepidopterist

Hermann Dewitz (5 November 1848, Obelischken, Insterburg – 15 May 1890 Berlin) was a German entomologist who specialized in Lepidoptera.

He was "Custos" or curator of the Department of Entomology at the Museum für Naturkunde in Berlin. Dewitz was interested in world butterflies especially those of South America, West and Central Africa and in 1882 he published Beschreibungen von Jugendstadien exotischer Lepidopteren (Nova acta Leopoldina Bd. 44, Nr. 2. Halle - E. Blockmann & Sohn), a work on the early stages of Lepidoptera.

He also wrote a number of scientific papers on a wide variety of entomological subjects, notably a series of articles on the motion of insects on smooth vertical surfaces.

== Publications ==
- 1879. Mittheilungen des Münchener Entomologischen Vereins
- 1881. Afrikanische Nachtschmetterlinge. Nova Acta Acad. Caesar. Leop. Carol. 42:
