= Arbelodes albitorquata =

Scientific classification
- Domain: Eukaryota
- Kingdom: Animalia
- Phylum: Arthropoda
- Class: Insecta
- Order: Lepidoptera
- Family: Cossidae
- Genus: Arbelodes
- Species: A. albitorquata

Binomial name
- Arbelodes albitorquata (Hampson, 1910)

Synonyms
- Metarbela albitorquata Hampson, 1910

Species of moth

Arbelodes albitorquata is a moth in the family Cossidae. It is found in South Africa in association with the Drakensberg/Great Escarpment, possibly including the Lesotho Highlands. The habitat consists of Afromontane grassland-forests and grassland-thicket mosaics.

The length of the forewings is about 12.5 mm.
