= Metarbela leucostigma =

Scientific classification
- Kingdom: Animalia
- Phylum: Arthropoda
- Class: Insecta
- Order: Lepidoptera
- Family: Cossidae
- Genus: Metarbela
- Species: M. leucostigma

Binomial name
- Metarbela leucostigma (Hampson, 1910)

Synonyms
- Teragra leucostigma Hampson, 1910

Species of moth

Metarbela leucostigma is a moth in the family Cossidae. It is found in Lesotho.
