= Moyencharia ochreicosta =

Scientific classification
- Kingdom: Animalia
- Phylum: Arthropoda
- Class: Insecta
- Order: Lepidoptera
- Family: Cossidae
- Genus: Moyencharia
- Species: M. ochreicosta

Binomial name
- Moyencharia ochreicosta (Gaede, 1929)

Synonyms
- Teragra ochreicosta Gaede, 1929; Teragra basiplaga Gaede, 1929; Teragra basiplaga f. fuscoradiata Gaede, 1929

Species of moth

Moyencharia ochreicosta is a moth of the family Cossidae. It is found from western Burkina Faso south through north-eastern and south-eastern Ghana to south-eastern and east-central Nigeria. It is probably also present in Togo and Benin. The habitat consists of rain forests and riparian forests at low elevations.

The wingspan is about 23.5 mm for males and 21 mm for males.
