= Cinnamomea =

Cinnamomea, cinnamomeus, or cinnamomeum is a Neo-Latin adjective meaning cinnamon-colored that occurs in the species names of many organisms. It may refer to:

== Birds ==
- Anthus cinnamomeus, the African pipit
- Attila cinnamomeus, the cinnamon attila
- Bradypterus cinnamomeus, the cinnamon bracken warbler
- Certhiaxis cinnamomeus, the yellow-chinned spinetail
- Cinclosoma cinnamomeum, the cinnamon quail-thrush
- Cisticola cinnamomeus, the pale-crowned cisticola
- Crypturellus cinnamomeus, the thicket tinamou or rufescent tinamou
- Hypocryptadius cinnamomeus, the cinnamon ibon
- Ixobrychus cinnamomeus, the cinnamon bittern or chestnut bittern
- Pachyramphus cinnamomeus, the cinnamon becard
- Pericrocotus cinnamomeus, the small minivet
- Picumnus cinnamomeus, the chestnut piculet
- Pyrrhomyias cinnamomeus, the cinnamon flycatcher
- Passer cinnamomeus, the russet sparrow

== Fungi ==
- Microglossum cinnamomeum
- Physocystidium cinnamomeum
- Trichoderma cinnamomeum

== Insects ==
- Copelatus cinnamomeus, a diving beetle
- Eublemma cinnamomeum, a moth
- Heteragrion cinnamomeum, a dragonfly
- Hoplogrammicosum cinnamomeum, a beetle
- Marasmarcha cinnamomeus, a moth
- Orthomegas cinnamomeus, a beetle

== Plants ==
- Odontoglossum cinnamomeum, an orchid
- Oncidium cinnamomeum, an orchid
- Osmundastrum cinnamomeum, a fern
- Rhododendron arboreum subsp. cinnamomeum, a flowering shrub
- Solanum cinnamomeum, a tomato species

== See also ==
- Cinnamomum
