= E. cinnamomea =

E. cinnamomea may refer to:

- Eublemma cinnamomea, a moth species found in the New World tropics, from the southern United States south to Argentina
- Euphaedra cinnamomea, a butterfly species found in the Democratic Republic of Congo

== See also ==
- Cinnamomea (disambiguation)
