= P. cinnamomea =

P. cinnamomea may refer to:

- Phragmataecia cinnamomea, a moth species found in Taiwan and southern China
- Pouteria cinnamomea, a plant species endemic to Peru

== See also ==
- Cinnamomea (disambiguation)
