= Orthomegas frischeiseni =

Scientific classification
- Kingdom: Animalia
- Phylum: Arthropoda
- Clade: Pancrustacea
- Class: Insecta
- Order: Coleoptera
- Suborder: Polyphaga
- Infraorder: Cucujiformia
- Family: Cerambycidae
- Genus: Orthomegas
- Species: O. frischeiseni

Binomial name
- Orthomegas frischeiseni (Lackerbeck, 1998)

Species of beetle

Orthomegas frischeiseni is a species of beetle in the family Cerambycidae. It is found in Peru, Bolivia and Brazil.
