= Phragmataecia terebrifer =

Scientific classification
- Domain: Eukaryota
- Kingdom: Animalia
- Phylum: Arthropoda
- Class: Insecta
- Order: Lepidoptera
- Family: Cossidae
- Genus: Phragmataecia
- Species: P. terebrifer

Binomial name
- Phragmataecia terebrifer T. B. Fletcher, 1927

Species of moth

Phragmataecia terebrifer is a species of moth of the family Cossidae. It was described by Thomas Bainbrigge Fletcher and is found in India.
