= Phragmataecia pectinicornis =

Scientific classification
- Domain: Eukaryota
- Kingdom: Animalia
- Phylum: Arthropoda
- Class: Insecta
- Order: Lepidoptera
- Family: Cossidae
- Genus: Phragmataecia
- Species: P. pectinicornis

Binomial name
- Phragmataecia pectinicornis (Strand, 1914)

Synonyms
- Phragmatoecioides pectinicornis Strand, 1914

Species of moth

Phragmataecia pectinicornis is a species of moth of the family Cossidae. It is found in South Sudan.
