= Phragmataecia andarana =

Scientific classification
- Kingdom: Animalia
- Phylum: Arthropoda
- Clade: Pancrustacea
- Class: Insecta
- Order: Lepidoptera
- Family: Cossidae
- Genus: Phragmataecia
- Species: P. andarana

Binomial name
- Phragmataecia andarana Clench, 1959

Species of moth

Phragmataecia andarana is a species of moth of the family Cossidae. It is found in Namibia and South Africa.
