= Phragmataecia gurkoi =

Scientific classification
- Kingdom: Animalia
- Phylum: Arthropoda
- Clade: Pancrustacea
- Class: Insecta
- Order: Lepidoptera
- Family: Cossidae
- Genus: Phragmataecia
- Species: P. gurkoi

Binomial name
- Phragmataecia gurkoi Yakovlev, 2007

Species of moth

Phragmataecia gurkoi is a species of moth of the family Cossidae. It is found in north-western Pakistan.

The length of the forewings is about 13 mm.
