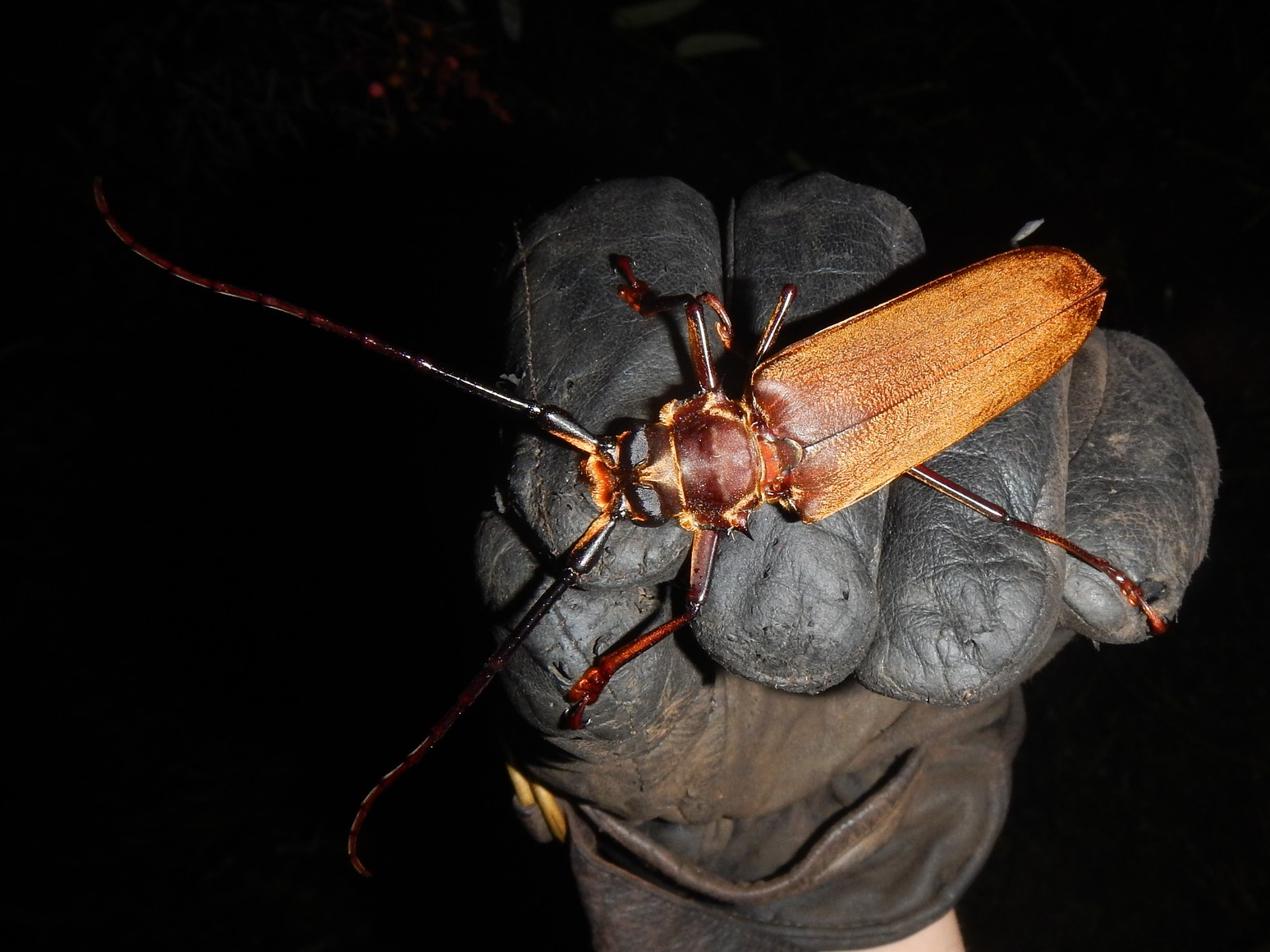

Scientific classification
- Kingdom: Animalia
- Phylum: Arthropoda
- Clade: Pancrustacea
- Class: Insecta
- Order: Coleoptera
- Suborder: Polyphaga
- Infraorder: Cucujiformia
- Family: Cerambycidae
- Genus: Orthomegas
- Species: O. maryae

Binomial name
- Orthomegas maryae (Schmid, 2011)

= Orthomegas maryae =

Species of beetle

Orthomegas maryae is a species of beetle in the family Cerambycidae. It is found in French Guiana.
