= Phragmataecia sericeata =

Scientific classification
- Domain: Eukaryota
- Kingdom: Animalia
- Phylum: Arthropoda
- Class: Insecta
- Order: Lepidoptera
- Family: Cossidae
- Genus: Phragmataecia
- Species: P. sericeata

Binomial name
- Phragmataecia sericeata Hampson, 1910

Species of insect

Phragmataecia sericeata is a species of moth of the family Cossidae. It is found in Ghana and Nigeria.
