= Phragmataecia pygmaea =

Scientific classification
- Domain: Eukaryota
- Kingdom: Animalia
- Phylum: Arthropoda
- Class: Insecta
- Order: Lepidoptera
- Family: Cossidae
- Genus: Phragmataecia
- Species: P. pygmaea

Binomial name
- Phragmataecia pygmaea Graeser, 1888

Species of moth

Phragmataecia pygmaea is a species of moth of the family Cossidae. It is found in south-eastern Russia, Korea and north-eastern China (Charbin).
