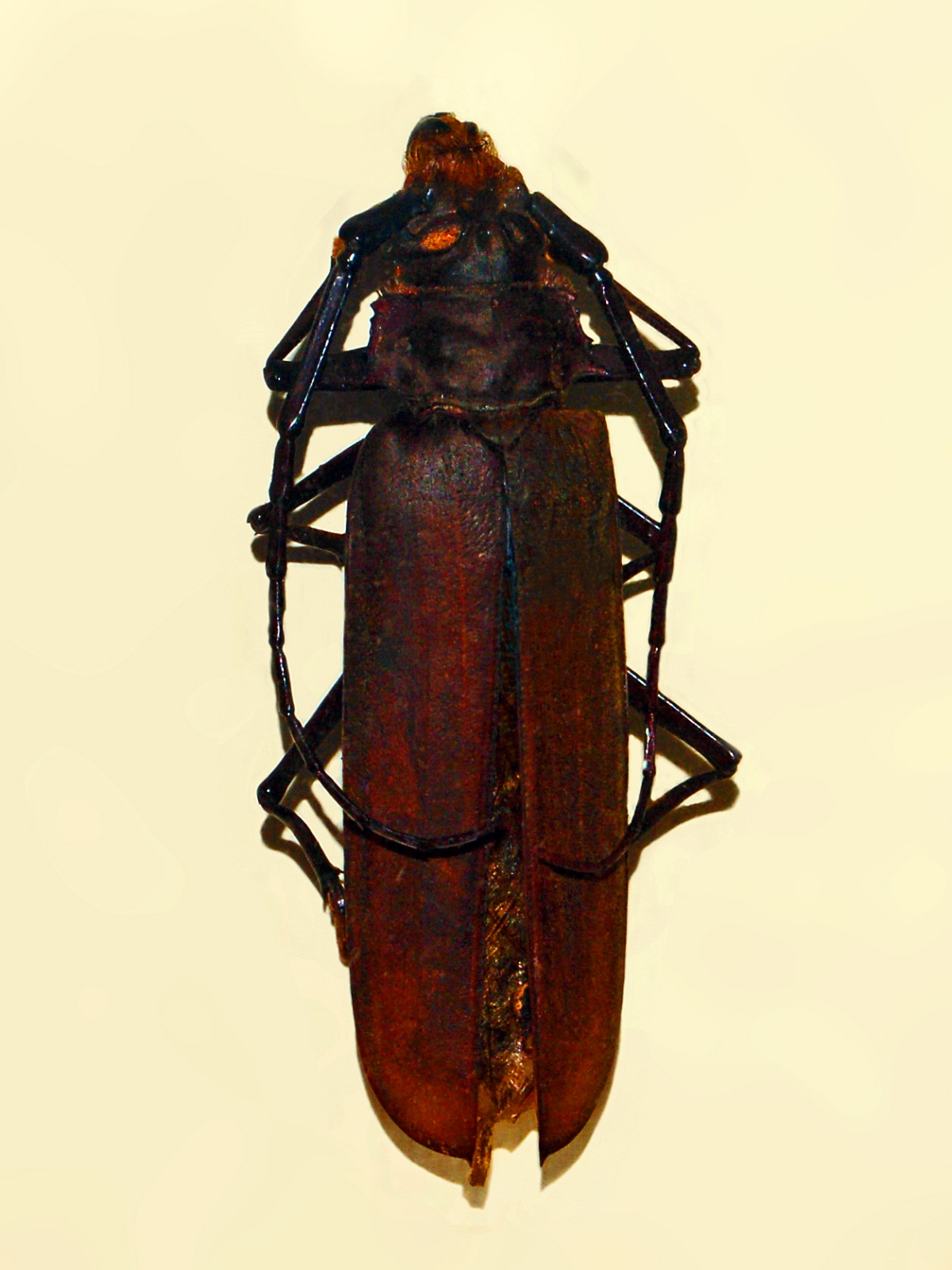
- From Brazil

Scientific classification
- Kingdom: Animalia
- Phylum: Arthropoda
- Clade: Pancrustacea
- Class: Insecta
- Order: Coleoptera
- Suborder: Polyphaga
- Infraorder: Cucujiformia
- Family: Cerambycidae
- Genus: Orthomegas
- Species: O. similis

Binomial name
- Orthomegas similis Gahan, 1894

Synonyms
- Callipogon similis (Gahan, 1894); Callipogon (Orthomegas) similis (Gahan, 1894); Callipogon joinvillei Ribeiro, 1935

= Orthomegas similis =

Species of beetle

Orthomegas similis is a species of longhorn beetle belonging to the family Cerambycidae. It is found in south-eastern Brazil and in Peru.

== Description ==
Orthomegas similis can reach a length of about 59–78.5 millimetres (2.32–3.09 in).
