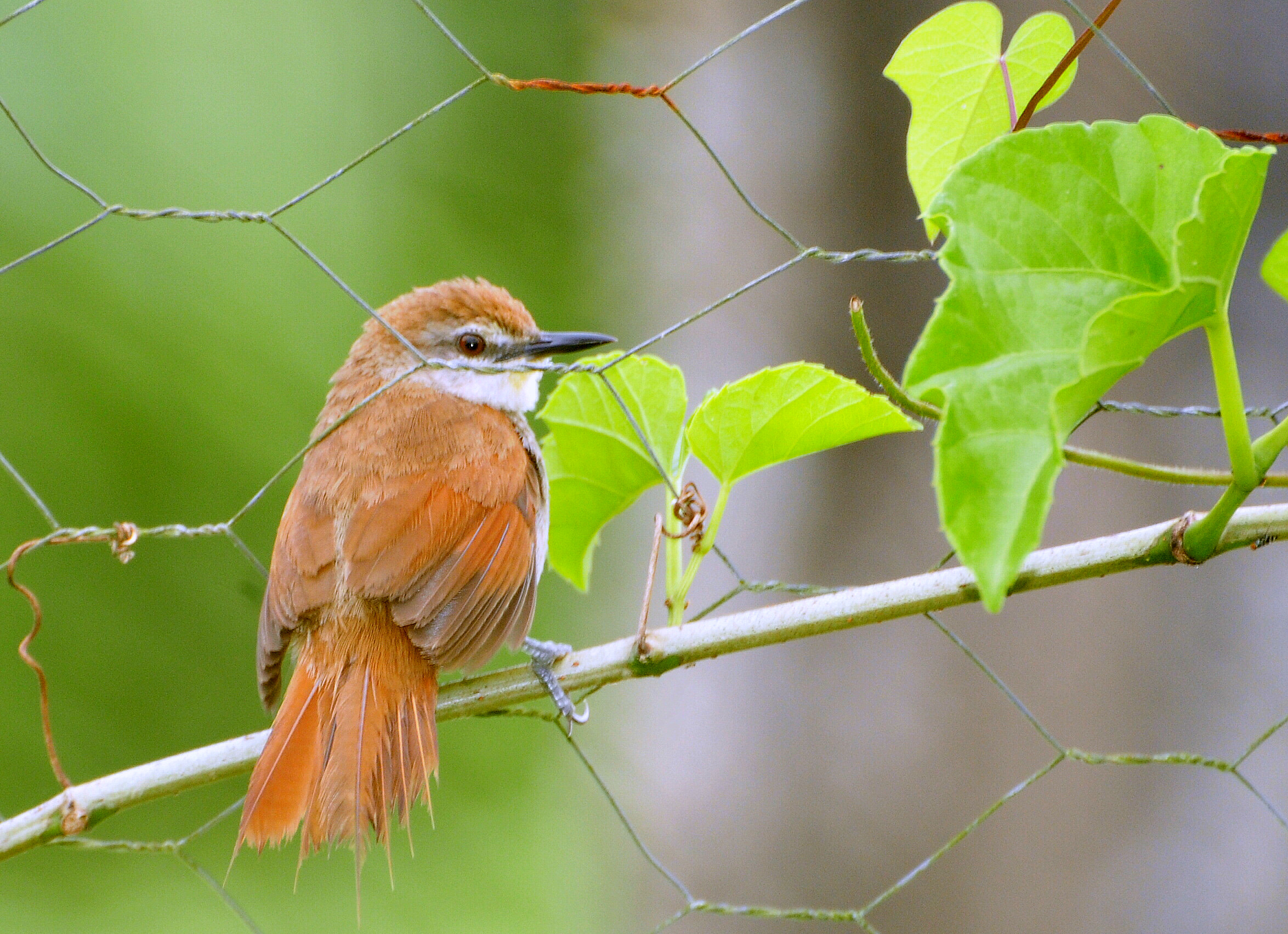
- Yellow-chinned spinetail (Certhiaxis cinnamomeus)

Scientific classification
- Kingdom: Animalia
- Phylum: Chordata
- Class: Aves
- Order: Passeriformes
- Family: Furnariidae
- Genus: Certhiaxis; Lesson, 1844

Type species
- Certhia cinnamomea Gmelin, JF, 1788

= Certhiaxis =

Genus of birds

Certhiaxis is a genus of Neotropical birds in the ovenbird family Furnariidae.

== Taxonomy ==
The genus Certhiaxis was introduced in 1844 by the French naturalist René Lesson with the yellow-chinned spinetail as the type species. The name is a combination of the genus Certhia that was introduced by Carl Linnaeus in 1758 for the treecreepers and the genus Synallaxis that was introduced by Louis Pierre Vieillot in 1818 for the spinetails.

The genus contains two species:

Image	Scientific name	Common name	Distribution
	Certhiaxis mustelinus	Red-and-white spinetail	Amazon Basin of Brazil and Peru; also the southern Amazon River border of Colombia and the headwaters of the Madeira River in Bolivia.
	Certhiaxis cinnamomeus	Yellow-chinned spinetail	Trinidad and Colombia south to Argentina and Uruguay
