= Phragmataecia saccharum =

Scientific classification
- Domain: Eukaryota
- Kingdom: Animalia
- Phylum: Arthropoda
- Class: Insecta
- Order: Lepidoptera
- Family: Cossidae
- Genus: Phragmataecia
- Species: P. saccharum

Binomial name
- Phragmataecia saccharum Moore, 1879

Species of moth

Phragmataecia saccharum is a species of moth of the family Cossidae. It is found in India.
