= Phragmataecia minor =

Scientific classification
- Domain: Eukaryota
- Kingdom: Animalia
- Phylum: Arthropoda
- Class: Insecta
- Order: Lepidoptera
- Family: Cossidae
- Genus: Phragmataecia
- Species: P. minor

Binomial name
- Phragmataecia minor Moore, 1879

Species of moth

Phragmataecia minor is a species of moth of the family Cossidae. It is found in Bangladesh, China (Lingping) and possibly Myanmar.
