= Phragmataecia sumatrensis =

Scientific classification
- Kingdom: Animalia
- Phylum: Arthropoda
- Class: Insecta
- Order: Lepidoptera
- Family: Cossidae
- Genus: Phragmataecia
- Species: P. sumatrensis

Binomial name
- Phragmataecia sumatrensis Snellen, 1892

Species of moth

Phragmataecia sumatrensis is a species of moth of the family Cossidae. It is found on Sumatra in Indonesia.
