= Phragmataecia itremo =

Scientific classification
- Kingdom: Animalia
- Phylum: Arthropoda
- Class: Insecta
- Order: Lepidoptera
- Family: Cossidae
- Genus: Phragmataecia
- Species: P. itremo

Binomial name
- Phragmataecia itremo Viette, 1974

Species of moth

Phragmataecia itremo is a species of moth of the family Cossidae. It is found on Madagascar.
