= Phragmataecia furia =

Scientific classification
- Domain: Eukaryota
- Kingdom: Animalia
- Phylum: Arthropoda
- Class: Insecta
- Order: Lepidoptera
- Family: Cossidae
- Genus: Phragmataecia
- Species: P. furia

Binomial name
- Phragmataecia furia Grum-Grshimailo, 1890

Species of moth

Phragmataecia furia is a species of moth of the family Cossidae. It is found in Uzbekistan, Afghanistan and possibly Tajikistan.
