= Phragmataecia minima =

Scientific classification
- Kingdom: Animalia
- Phylum: Arthropoda
- Class: Insecta
- Order: Lepidoptera
- Family: Cossidae
- Genus: Phragmataecia
- Species: P. minima

Binomial name
- Phragmataecia minima Hampson, 1891

Species of moth

Phragmataecia minima is a species of moth of the family Cossidae. It is found in southern India.
