= Phragmataecia innotata =

Scientific classification
- Kingdom: Animalia
- Phylum: Arthropoda
- Class: Insecta
- Order: Lepidoptera
- Family: Cossidae
- Genus: Phragmataecia
- Species: P. innotata

Binomial name
- Phragmataecia innotata (Walker, 1865)

Synonyms
- Zeuzera innotata Walker, 1865

Species of moth

Phragmataecia innotata is a species of moth of the family Cossidae.

The moth is found in China, Vietnam, Laos, and Thailand.
