= Phragmataecia longivitta =

Scientific classification
- Domain: Eukaryota
- Kingdom: Animalia
- Phylum: Arthropoda
- Class: Insecta
- Order: Lepidoptera
- Family: Cossidae
- Genus: Phragmataecia
- Species: P. longivitta

Binomial name
- Phragmataecia longivitta Ćandèze, 1926

Species of moth

Phragmataecia longivitta is a species of moth of the family Cossidae. It is found in Laos.
