= Phragmataecia psyche =

Scientific classification
- Domain: Eukaryota
- Kingdom: Animalia
- Phylum: Arthropoda
- Class: Insecta
- Order: Lepidoptera
- Family: Cossidae
- Genus: Phragmataecia
- Species: P. psyche

Binomial name
- Phragmataecia psyche (Le Cerf, 1919)

Synonyms
- Azygophleps psyche Le Cerf, 1919

Species of moth

Phragmataecia psyche is a species of moth of the family Cossidae. It is found in Benin, Niger and Senegal.
