= Phragmataecia gummata =

Scientific classification
- Kingdom: Animalia
- Phylum: Arthropoda
- Clade: Pancrustacea
- Class: Insecta
- Order: Lepidoptera
- Family: Cossidae
- Genus: Phragmataecia
- Species: P. gummata

Binomial name
- Phragmataecia gummata Swinhoe, 1892

Synonyms
- Phragmatoecia lata Snellen, 1895; Phragmataecia lata; Phragmatoecia sordida Snellen, 1901; Phragmataecia sordida

Species of moth

Phragmataecia gummata is a species of moth of the family Cossidae. It is found in China (Fujien, Lingping), Vietnam, Thailand, and Indonesia (Java, Sumatra).
