= Phragmataecia roborowskii =

Scientific classification
- Domain: Eukaryota
- Kingdom: Animalia
- Phylum: Arthropoda
- Class: Insecta
- Order: Lepidoptera
- Family: Cossidae
- Genus: Phragmataecia
- Species: P. roborowskii

Binomial name
- Phragmataecia roborowskii Alpheraky, 1897

Synonyms
- Phragmataecia longialatus Hua, Chou, Fang & Chen, 1990

Species of moth

Phragmataecia roborowskii is a species of moth of the family Cossidae. It is found in north-western China and southern Mongolia.
