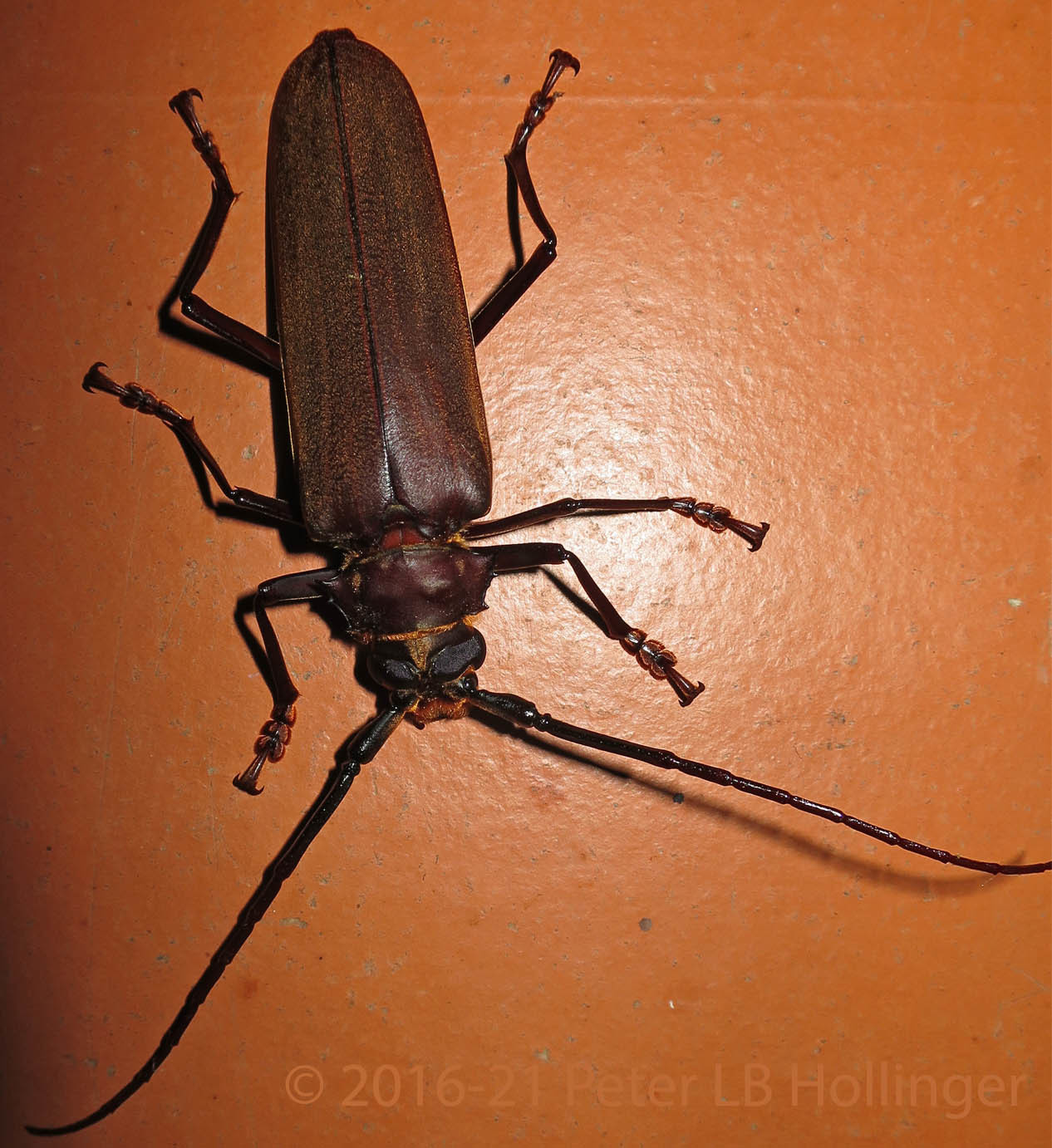

Scientific classification
- Kingdom: Animalia
- Phylum: Arthropoda
- Clade: Pancrustacea
- Class: Insecta
- Order: Coleoptera
- Suborder: Polyphaga
- Infraorder: Cucujiformia
- Family: Cerambycidae
- Genus: Orthomegas
- Species: O. pehlkei

Binomial name
- Orthomegas pehlkei (Lameere, 1904)

= Orthomegas pehlkei =

Species of beetle

Orthomegas pehlkei is a species of beetle in the genus Orthomegas of the family Cerambycidae. It is found in Colombia and Peru.
