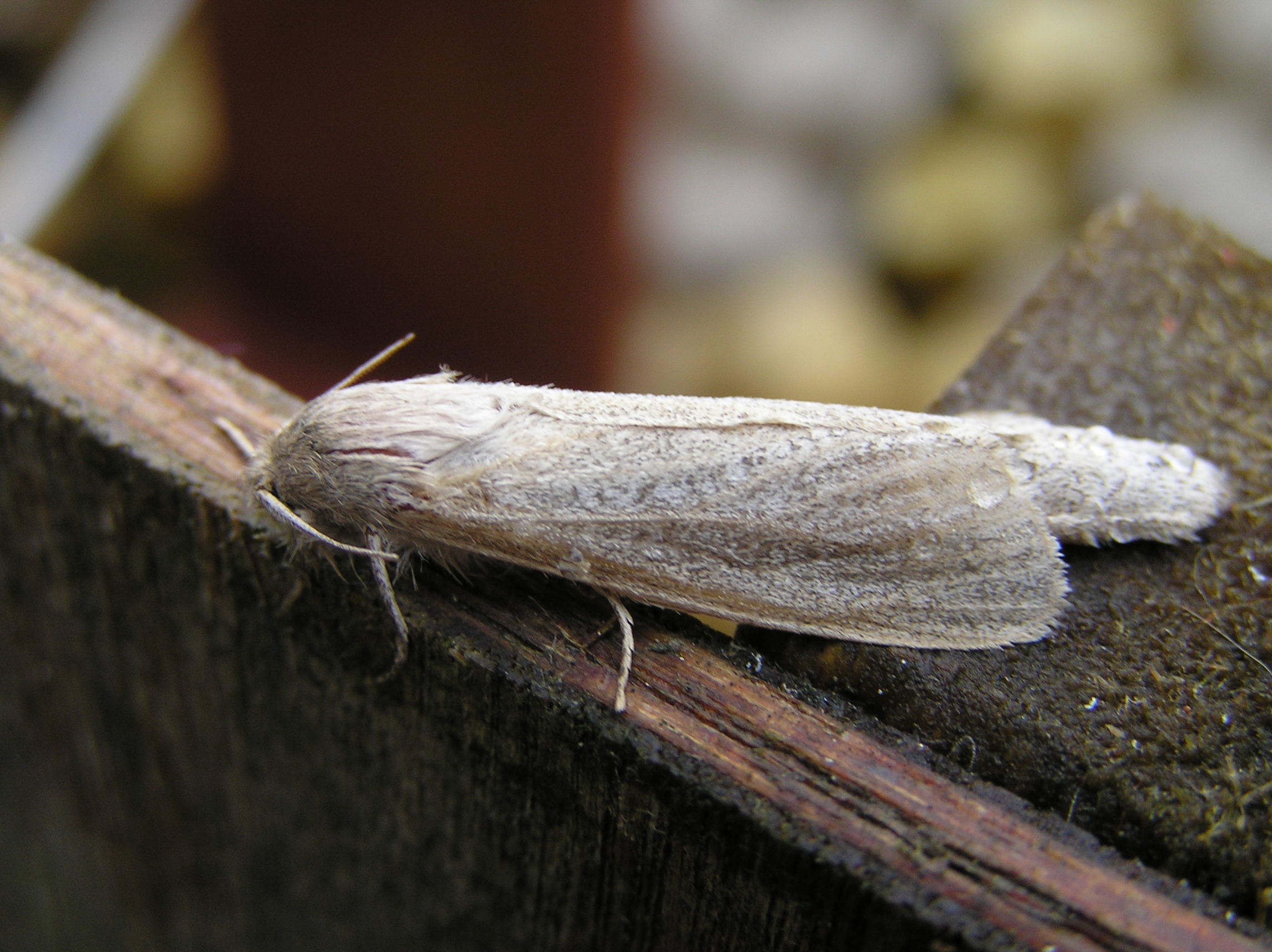
- Reed leopard (Phragmataecia castaneae)

Scientific classification
- Domain: Eukaryota
- Kingdom: Animalia
- Phylum: Arthropoda
- Class: Insecta
- Order: Lepidoptera
- Family: Cossidae
- Subfamily: Zeuzerinae
- Genus: Phragmataecia; Newman, 1950

Species
- See text

Synonyms
- Synaptophleps Hering, 1923; Phragmatoecioides Strand, 1915; Macrogaster Duponchel, [1845]; Rhizona Herrich-Schafer, 1854; Rhizoma Walker, 1856; Synatophlebs Aurivillius, 1925

= Phragmataecia =

Genus of moths

Phragmataecia is a genus of moths belonging to the family Cossidae. Members of this genus are found in the Old World.

== Description ==
Members of this genus are generally medium-sized with very long abdomens, especially in females, and long bipectinate antennae. In males the length of pecten abruptly shortens to the distal part of tip, while in females pecten length is short to the tip of antenna as near invisible papilla. Coloration is white to black with unexpressed wing patterns except small black dots between the vein of the forewing in females.

== Distribution ==
As of 2012, the genus had 39 species distributed in the Old World.

== Species ==
- Phragmataecia albida
- Phragmataecia andarana
- Phragmataecia anikini
- Phragmataecia annapurna
- Phragmataecia brunni
- Phragmataecia castaneae
- Phragmataecia cinnamomea
- Phragmataecia dushman
- Phragmataecia furia
- Phragmataecia fusca
- Phragmataecia fuscifusa
- Phragmataecia geisha
- Phragmataecia gummata
- Phragmataecia gurkoi
- Phragmataecia hummeli
- Phragmataecia impura
- Phragmataecia innominata
- Phragmataecia innotata
- Phragmataecia irrorata
- Phragmataecia itremo
- Phragmataecia laszloi
- Phragmataecia longivitta
- Phragmataecia minima
- Phragmataecia minor
- Phragmataecia monika
- Phragmataecia okovangae
- Phragmataecia pacifica
- Phragmataecia parvipuncta
- Phragmataecia pectinicornis
- Phragmataecia pelostema
- Phragmataecia psyche
- Phragmataecia purpureus
- Phragmataecia pygmaea
- Phragmataecia roborowskii
- Phragmataecia saccharum
- Phragmataecia sericeata
- Phragmataecia sumatrensis
- Phragmataecia terebrifer
- Phragmataecia turkmenbashi
