= Phragmataecia albida =

Scientific classification
- Kingdom: Animalia
- Phylum: Arthropoda
- Clade: Pancrustacea
- Class: Insecta
- Order: Lepidoptera
- Family: Cossidae
- Genus: Phragmataecia
- Species: P. albida

Binomial name
- Phragmataecia albida Erschoff, 1874

Synonyms
- Phragmataecia castanea var. albida Erschoff, 1874; Phragmatoecia albida; Phragmacossia albida; Phragamataecia erschoffi Reisser, 1962

Species of moth

Phragmataecia albida is a species of moth of the family Cossidae. It is found in Iran, Afghanistan, Central Asia, southeastern European Russia, and northwestern China.
