= Orthomegas folschveilleri =

Scientific classification
- Kingdom: Animalia
- Phylum: Arthropoda
- Clade: Pancrustacea
- Class: Insecta
- Order: Coleoptera
- Suborder: Polyphaga
- Infraorder: Cucujiformia
- Family: Cerambycidae
- Genus: Orthomegas
- Species: O. folschveilleri

Binomial name
- Orthomegas folschveilleri Audureau, 2011

Species of beetle

Orthomegas folschveilleri is a species of beetle in the family Cerambycidae. It is found in Mexico (Guerrero, Oaxaca).

Orthomegas folschveilleri measure 56–77 mm (2.2–3.0 in).
