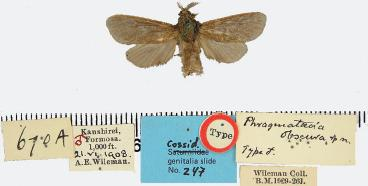

Scientific classification
- Domain: Eukaryota
- Kingdom: Animalia
- Phylum: Arthropoda
- Class: Insecta
- Order: Lepidoptera
- Family: Cossidae
- Genus: Phragmataecia
- Species: P. fusca

Binomial name
- Phragmataecia fusca Wileman, 1911

Synonyms
- Phragamataecia fusca; Phragmataecia obscura Wileman, 1911

= Phragmataecia fusca =

Species of moth

Phragmataecia fusca is a species of moth of the family Cossidae. It is found in Taiwan, Thailand and Hong Kong.
