= Phragmataecia geisha =

Scientific classification
- Kingdom: Animalia
- Phylum: Arthropoda
- Clade: Pancrustacea
- Class: Insecta
- Order: Lepidoptera
- Family: Cossidae
- Genus: Phragmataecia
- Species: P. geisha

Binomial name
- Phragmataecia geisha Yakovlev, 2011

Species of moth

Phragmataecia geisha is a species of moth of the family Cossidae. It is found in Japan.
