= Phragmataecia fuscifusa =

Scientific classification
- Kingdom: Animalia
- Phylum: Arthropoda
- Class: Insecta
- Order: Lepidoptera
- Family: Cossidae
- Genus: Phragmataecia
- Species: P. fuscifusa

Binomial name
- Phragmataecia fuscifusa Hampson, 1910

Species of moth

Phragmataecia fuscifusa is a species of moth of the family Cossidae. It is found in Sierra Leone and Nigeria.
