= Phragmataecia innominata =

Scientific classification
- Domain: Eukaryota
- Kingdom: Animalia
- Phylum: Arthropoda
- Class: Insecta
- Order: Lepidoptera
- Family: Cossidae
- Genus: Phragmataecia
- Species: P. innominata

Binomial name
- Phragmataecia innominata Dalla Torre, 1923

Synonyms
- Phragmatoecia reticulata Hampson, 1910

Species of moth

Phragmataecia innominata is a species of moth of the family Cossidae. It is found in South Africa, Mozambique and Malawi.
