= Phragmataecia purpureus =

Scientific classification
- Domain: Eukaryota
- Kingdom: Animalia
- Phylum: Arthropoda
- Class: Insecta
- Order: Lepidoptera
- Family: Cossidae
- Genus: Phragmataecia
- Species: P. purpureus

Binomial name
- Phragmataecia purpureus T. B. Fletcher, 1927

Species of moth

Phragmataecia purpureus is a species of moth of the family Cossidae described by Thomas Bainbrigge Fletcher in 1927. It is found in Bihar, India.
