= Orthomegas sylvainae =

Scientific classification
- Kingdom: Animalia
- Phylum: Arthropoda
- Clade: Pancrustacea
- Class: Insecta
- Order: Coleoptera
- Suborder: Polyphaga
- Infraorder: Cucujiformia
- Family: Cerambycidae
- Genus: Orthomegas
- Species: O. sylvainae

Binomial name
- Orthomegas sylvainae Audureau, 2011

Species of beetle

Orthomegas sylvainae is a species of beetle in the family Cerambycidae. It is found in French Guiana and Venezuela.

Orthomegas sylvainae measure 54–78 mm (2.1–3.1 in).
