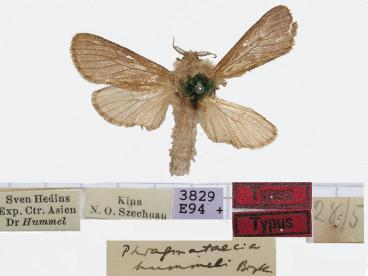

Scientific classification
- Kingdom: Animalia
- Phylum: Arthropoda
- Class: Insecta
- Order: Lepidoptera
- Family: Cossidae
- Genus: Phragmataecia
- Species: P. hummeli

Binomial name
- Phragmataecia hummeli Bryk, 1942

= Phragmataecia hummeli =

Species of moth

Phragmataecia hummeli is a species of moth of the family Cossidae. It is found in China (north-eastern Sichuan).
