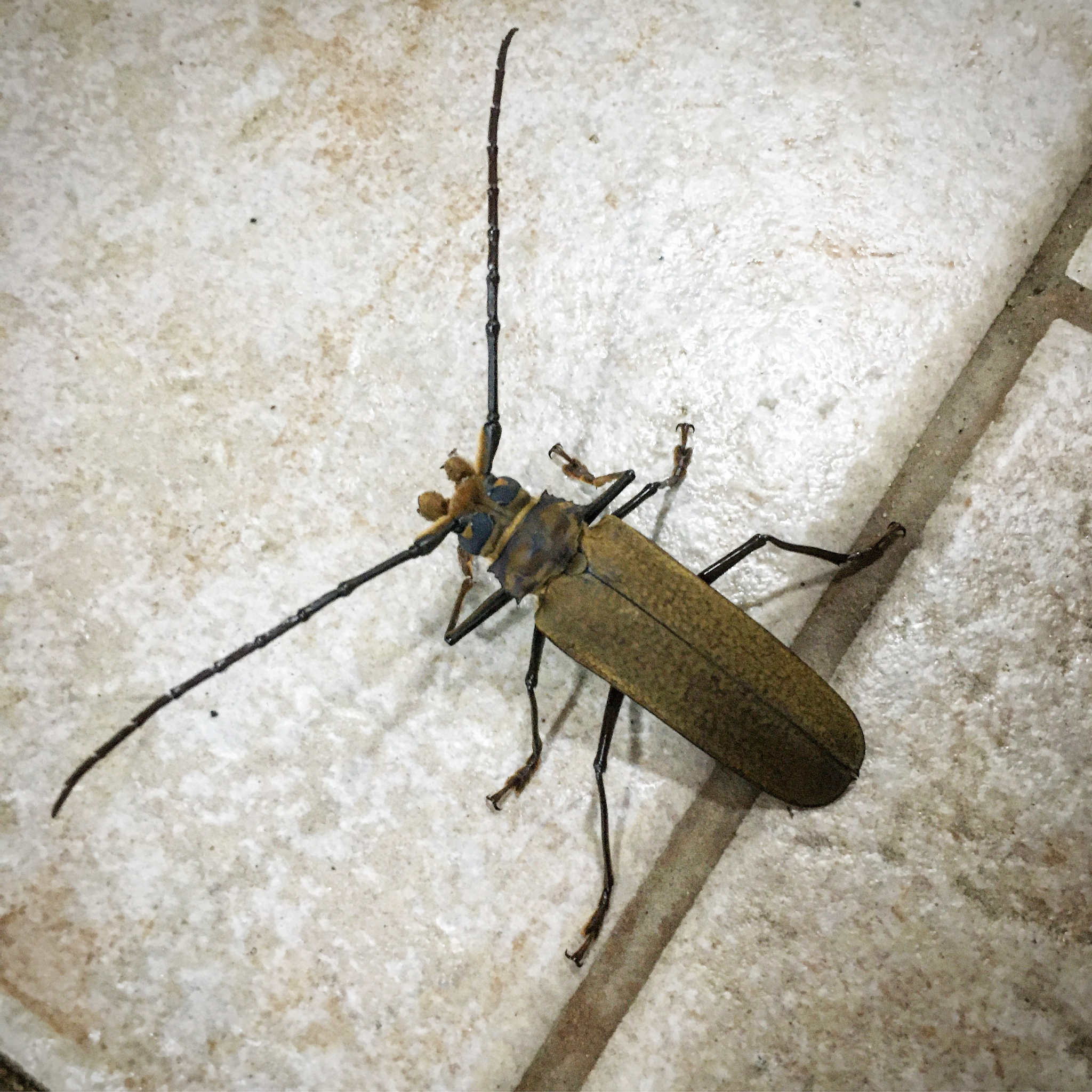

Scientific classification
- Kingdom: Animalia
- Phylum: Arthropoda
- Clade: Pancrustacea
- Class: Insecta
- Order: Coleoptera
- Suborder: Polyphaga
- Infraorder: Cucujiformia
- Family: Cerambycidae
- Genus: Orthomegas
- Species: O. jaspideus

Binomial name
- Orthomegas jaspideus Buquet in Guérin-Méneville, 1844

= Orthomegas jaspideus =

Species of beetle

Orthomegas jaspideus is a species of beetle in the family Cerambycidae. It is found in Brazil, Paraguay and Argentina.
