= Phragmataecia annapurna =

Scientific classification
- Kingdom: Animalia
- Phylum: Arthropoda
- Clade: Pancrustacea
- Class: Insecta
- Order: Lepidoptera
- Family: Cossidae
- Genus: Phragmataecia
- Species: P. annapurna

Binomial name
- Phragmataecia annapurna Yakovlev, 2009

Species of moth

Phragmataecia annapurna is a species of moth of the family Cossidae. It is found in Annapurna Himal in Nepal.
