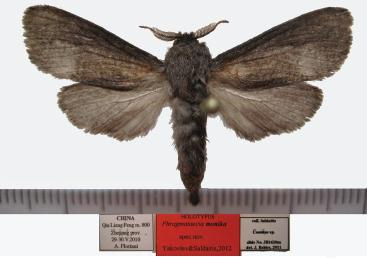

Scientific classification
- Kingdom: Animalia
- Phylum: Arthropoda
- Clade: Pancrustacea
- Class: Insecta
- Order: Lepidoptera
- Family: Cossidae
- Genus: Phragmataecia
- Species: P. monika

Binomial name
- Phragmataecia monika Yakovlev & Saldaitis, 2012

= Phragmataecia monika =

Species of moth

Phragmataecia monika is a species of moth of the family Cossidae. It is known only from the Qinliangfeng mountain in Zhejiang province of eastern China.

The wingspan is about 31 mm. The ground color of the forewings is blackish brown, but the median part of the wing (from the base to the inner edge) is yellow brown extending to the j-shaped wing edge. The hindwings are yellow.

The single known male specimen was attracted to light in late May at an altitude of 800 meters in mountainous virgin mixed forest habitat dominated by various broad-leaved trees. The suspected host plants are Phragmites species.

== Etymology ==
The species is named after Monika Rimsaite, daughter of one of the authors.
