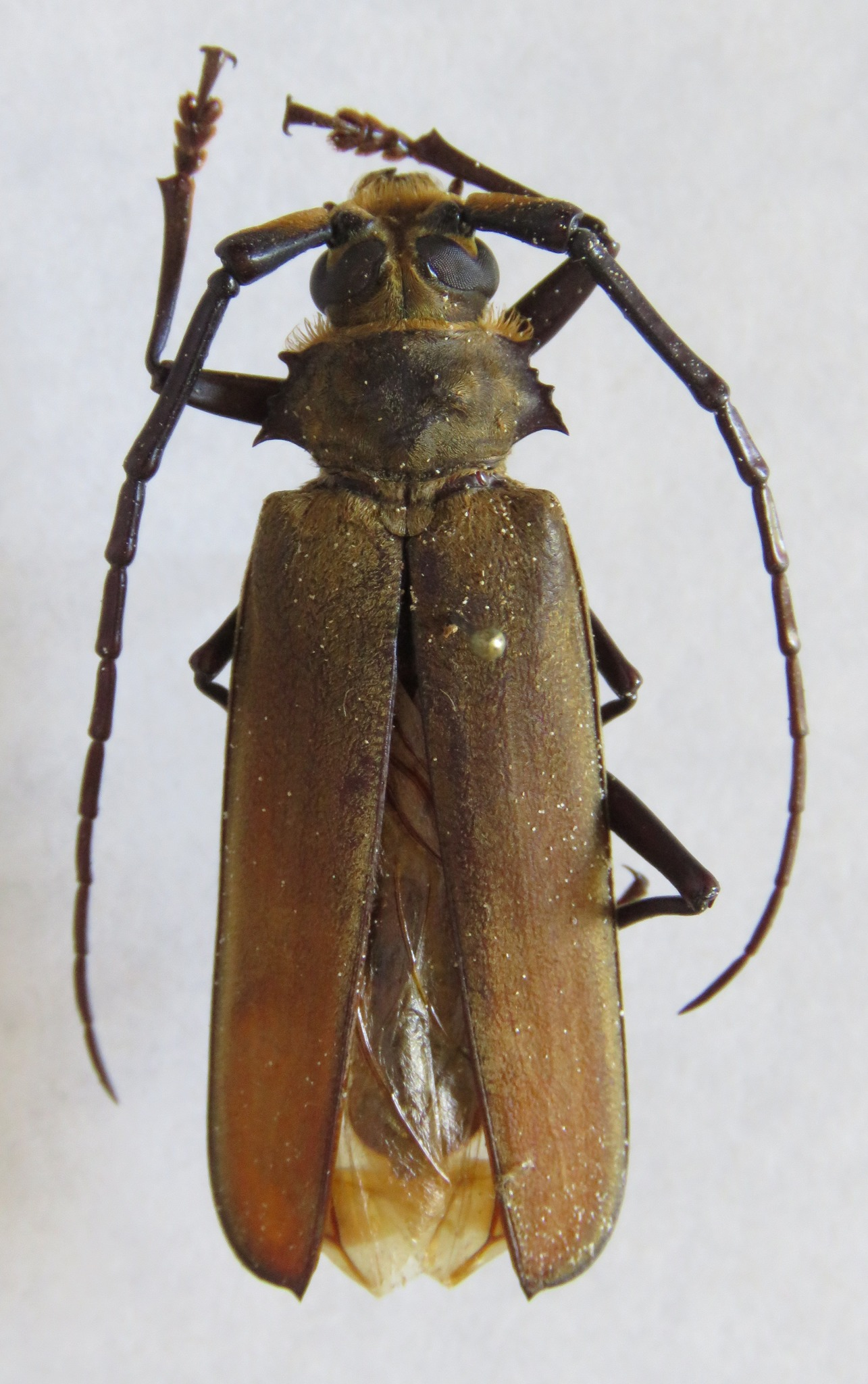

Scientific classification
- Kingdom: Animalia
- Phylum: Arthropoda
- Clade: Pancrustacea
- Class: Insecta
- Order: Coleoptera
- Suborder: Polyphaga
- Infraorder: Cucujiformia
- Family: Cerambycidae
- Genus: Orthomegas
- Species: O. marechali

Binomial name
- Orthomegas marechali (Bleuzen, 1993)

= Orthomegas marechali =

Species of beetle

Orthomegas marechali is a species of beetle in the family Cerambycidae. It is found in Nicaragua, Costa Rica, Panama and Colombia.
