= Phragmataecia anikini =

Scientific classification
- Kingdom: Animalia
- Phylum: Arthropoda
- Clade: Pancrustacea
- Class: Insecta
- Order: Lepidoptera
- Family: Cossidae
- Genus: Phragmataecia
- Species: P. anikini

Binomial name
- Phragmataecia anikini Yakovlev, 2011

Species of moth

Phragmataecia anikini is a species of moth of the family Cossidae. It is found in south-western Mongolia (Hovd aimak, Dzhungarian Gobi desert).
