= Phragmataecia pacifica =

Scientific classification
- Kingdom: Animalia
- Phylum: Arthropoda
- Clade: Pancrustacea
- Class: Insecta
- Order: Lepidoptera
- Family: Cossidae
- Genus: Phragmataecia
- Species: P. pacifica

Binomial name
- Phragmataecia pacifica Yakovlev, 2007

Species of moth

Phragmataecia pacifica is a species of moth of the family Cossidae. It is found in Russia, the Caucasus and Dagestan.

The length of the forewings is about 18.5 mm.
