= Phragmataecia dushman =

Scientific classification
- Kingdom: Animalia
- Phylum: Arthropoda
- Clade: Pancrustacea
- Class: Insecta
- Order: Lepidoptera
- Family: Cossidae
- Genus: Phragmataecia
- Species: P. dushman

Binomial name
- Phragmataecia dushman Yakovlev, 2009

Species of moth

Phragmataecia dushman is a species of moth of the family Cossidae. It is found in Afghanistan.
