= Orthomegas monnei =

Scientific classification
- Kingdom: Animalia
- Phylum: Arthropoda
- Clade: Pancrustacea
- Class: Insecta
- Order: Coleoptera
- Suborder: Polyphaga
- Infraorder: Cucujiformia
- Family: Cerambycidae
- Genus: Orthomegas
- Species: O. monnei

Binomial name
- Orthomegas monnei (Bleuzen, 1993)

Species of beetle

Orthomegas monnei is a species of beetle in the family Cerambycidae. It is found in south-eastern Mexico and Costa Rica.
