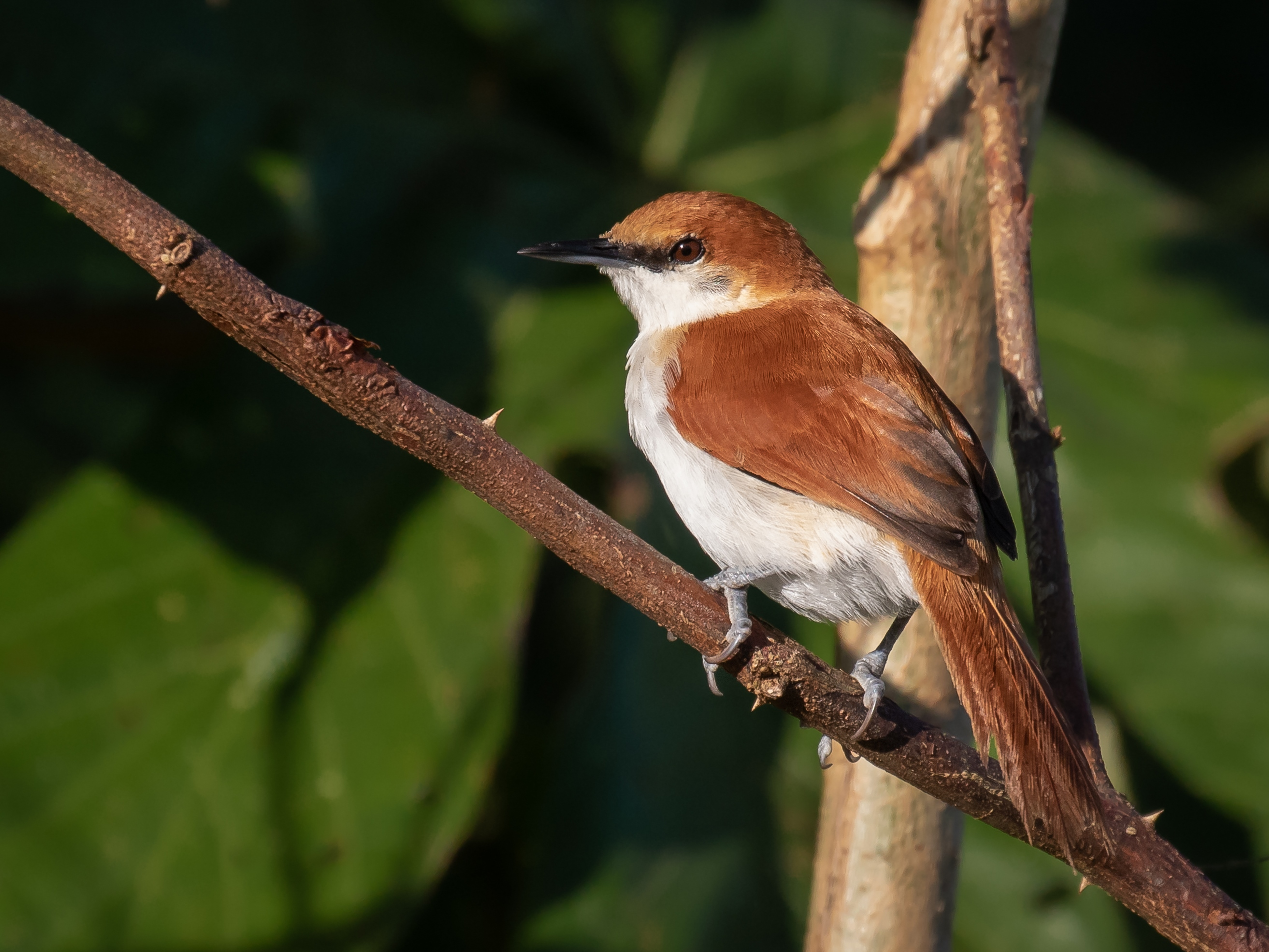
- At Iranduba, Amazonas, Brazil

Conservation status
- Least Concern (IUCN 3.1)

Scientific classification
- Kingdom: Animalia
- Phylum: Chordata
- Class: Aves
- Order: Passeriformes
- Family: Furnariidae
- Genus: Certhiaxis
- Species: C. mustelinus

Binomial name
- Certhiaxis mustelinus (Sclater, PL, 1874)

= Red-and-white spinetail =

Species of bird

The red-and-white spinetail (Certhiaxis mustelinus) is a species of bird in the Furnariinae subfamily of the ovenbird family Furnariidae. It is found in Brazil, Colombia, and Peru.

== Taxonomy and systematics ==
The red-and-white spinetail shares genus Certhiaxis with the yellow-chinned spinetail (C. cinnamomeus). It is monotypic.

== Description ==
The red-and-white spinetail is 14 to 15 cm (5.5 to 5.9 in) long and weighs 14 to 16 g (0.49 to 0.56 oz). The sexes have the same plumage. Adults have black lores and a dusky brown line through the eye on an otherwise reddish brown face. Their crown and back are also reddish brown, with the back being slightly lighter. Their rump is a paler rufescent brown. Their wings are mostly bright rufous with dark fuscous tips on the flight feathers. Their tail is mostly rufous with duller brown inner webs on the central pair of feathers; the feathers have few barbs on their ends giving a spiny appearance. Their chin and throat are white. Their underparts are white with a pale buff wash on the belly, flanks, and undertail coverts. Their iris is brown, their maxilla gray to blackish, their mandible dark gray, and their legs and feet light gray. Juveniles have less uniform rufous upperparts than adults, with a dusky crown and some faint mottling on the breast.

== Distribution and habitat ==
The red-and-white spinetail is found along river corridors in the central Amazon Basin, mostly in Brazil but also in extreme southeastern Colombia and in northeastern Peru. The major rivers are Peru's Ucayali and Brazil's Madeira, Juruá, Purús, and the Amazon itself to the Atlantic Ocean. It primarily inhabits freshwater marshes, especially those around old river islands where there is a mix of bushes, grasses, and emergent vegetation. In its small Colombian range it occurs very locally in seasonally flooded grasslands. In elevation it ranges from near sea level to 150 m (500 ft).

== Behavior ==
=== Movement ===
The red-and-white spinetail is essentially resident throughout its range, though it probably makes local movements from flooded islands during the rainy season.

=== Feeding ===
The red-and-white spinetail feeds on arthropods. It forages singly and in pairs, gleaning prey from foliage and small branches close to the ground.

=== Breeding ===
The red-and-white spinetail is thought to be monogamous. Its nest is a ball of thorny sticks built in low vegetation over water. Nothing else is known about its breeding biology.

=== Vocalization ===
The red-and-white spinetail's song is a "loud, dry, irregularly undulating rattle": "tch-t-t-t-t-t-t-t-t-t-t-t-t-t". Its call is "chuk-cheh" or "chuck-chuck-chuck".

== Status ==
The IUCN has assessed the red-and-white spinetail as being of Least Concern. It has a large range and an unknown population size that is believed to be stable. No immediate threats have been identified. It is considered rare to uncommon; "[o]wing to linear nature of habitat, global population almost certainly rather small".
