= Phragmataecia parvipuncta =

Scientific classification
- Kingdom: Animalia
- Phylum: Arthropoda
- Class: Insecta
- Order: Lepidoptera
- Family: Cossidae
- Genus: Phragmataecia
- Species: P. parvipuncta

Binomial name
- Phragmataecia parvipuncta (Hampson, 1892)

Synonyms
- Cossus parvipuncta Hampson, 1892

Species of moth

Phragmataecia parvipuncta is a species of moth of the family Cossidae. It is found in India, Sri Lanka and Vietnam.
