= Orthomegas irroratus =

Scientific classification
- Kingdom: Animalia
- Phylum: Arthropoda
- Clade: Pancrustacea
- Class: Insecta
- Order: Coleoptera
- Suborder: Polyphaga
- Infraorder: Cucujiformia
- Family: Cerambycidae
- Genus: Orthomegas
- Species: O. irroratus

Binomial name
- Orthomegas irroratus (Lameere, 1915)

Species of beetle

Orthomegas irroratus is a species of beetle in the family Cerambycidae. It is found in Colombia.

== Description ==
The average length of the Orthomegas irroratus is 62.7 to 65.2 millimetres long. The colour is usually dark-brown or reddish brown. The area behind its eyes are reddish yellow, along with its seta.
