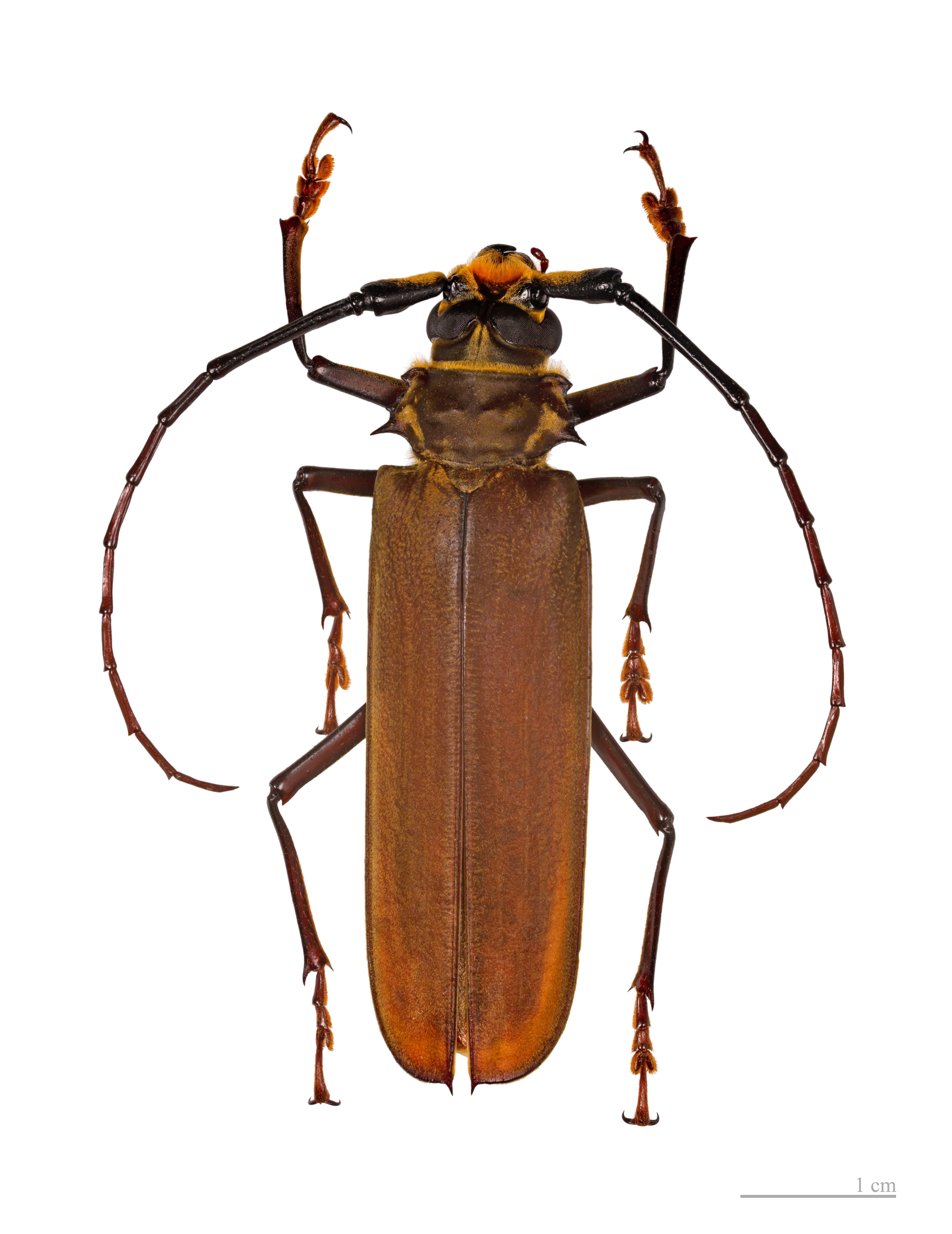
- Orthomegas cinnamomeus

Scientific classification
- Kingdom: Animalia
- Phylum: Arthropoda
- Clade: Pancrustacea
- Class: Insecta
- Order: Coleoptera
- Suborder: Polyphaga
- Infraorder: Cucujiformia
- Family: Cerambycidae
- Subfamily: Prioninae
- Tribe: Callipogonini
- Genus: Orthomegas; Audinet-Serville, 1832

= Orthomegas =

Genus of beetles

Orthomegas is a genus of beetles in the family Cerambycidae, containing the following species:

- Orthomegas cinnamomeus (Linnaeus, 1758)
- Orthomegas folschveilleri Audureau, 2011
- Orthomegas fragosoi (Bleuzen, 1993)
- Orthomegas frischeiseni (Lackerbeck, 1998)
- Orthomegas haxairei (Bleuzen, 1993)
- Orthomegas irroratus (Lameere, 1915)
- Orthomegas jaspideus Buquet in Guérin-Méneville, 1844
- Orthomegas marechali (Bleuzen, 1993)
- Orthomegas maryae (Schmid, 2011)
- Orthomegas monnei (Bleuzen, 1993)
- Orthomegas pehlkei (Lameere, 1904)
- Orthomegas similis (Gahan, 1894)
- Orthomegas sylvainae Audureau, 2011
