= Phragmataecia turkmenbashi =

Scientific classification
- Kingdom: Animalia
- Phylum: Arthropoda
- Clade: Pancrustacea
- Class: Insecta
- Order: Lepidoptera
- Family: Cossidae
- Genus: Phragmataecia
- Species: P. turkmenbashi

Binomial name
- Phragmataecia turkmenbashi Yakovlev, 2008

Species of moth

Phragmataecia turkmenbashi is a species of moth of the family Cossidae. It is found in Turkmenistan (the Kopetdagh Mountains, Valley of Ipay-Kala).
