= Phragmataecia impura =

Scientific classification
- Kingdom: Animalia
- Phylum: Arthropoda
- Class: Insecta
- Order: Lepidoptera
- Family: Cossidae
- Genus: Phragmataecia
- Species: P. impura

Binomial name
- Phragmataecia impura Hampson, 1891

Species of moth

Phragmataecia impura is a species of moth of the family Cossidae. It is found in India, Nepal, southern China (Hainan, Zhejiang and Guangxi), Vietnam, Laos, Thailand and Java.
