= Phragmataecia pelostema =

Scientific classification
- Kingdom: Animalia
- Phylum: Arthropoda
- Clade: Pancrustacea
- Class: Insecta
- Order: Lepidoptera
- Family: Cossidae
- Genus: Phragmataecia
- Species: P. pelostema

Binomial name
- Phragmataecia pelostema (Hering, 1923)

Synonyms
- Synaptophleps pelostema Hering, 1923

Species of moth

Phragmataecia pelostema is a species of moth of the family Cossidae. It is found in Togo, Nigeria, Cameroon, and the Democratic Republic of the Congo. It was described by German entomologist Erich Martin Hering in 1923.
