= Phragmataecia irrorata =

Scientific classification
- Kingdom: Animalia
- Phylum: Arthropoda
- Class: Insecta
- Order: Lepidoptera
- Family: Cossidae
- Genus: Phragmataecia
- Species: P. irrorata

Binomial name
- Phragmataecia irrorata Hampson, 1910

Species of moth

Phragmataecia irrorata is a species of moth of the family Cossidae. It is found in Zimbabwe, South Africa, Namibia, Botswana, Mozambique, Zambia and Malawi.
