= Phragmataecia brunni =

Scientific classification
- Kingdom: Animalia
- Phylum: Arthropoda
- Class: Insecta
- Order: Lepidoptera
- Family: Cossidae
- Genus: Phragmataecia
- Species: P. brunni

Binomial name
- Phragmataecia brunni Pagenstecher, 1892

Species of moth

Phragmataecia brunni is a species of moth of the family Cossidae. It is found in Tanzania.
