= Hoplogrammicosum =

Hoplogrammicosum cinnamomeum

Scientific classification
- Kingdom: Animalia
- Phylum: Arthropoda
- Class: Insecta
- Order: Coleoptera
- Suborder: Polyphaga
- Infraorder: Cucujiformia
- Family: Cerambycidae
- Genus: Hoplogrammicosum
- Species: H. cinnamomeum

Binomial name
- Hoplogrammicosum cinnamomeum Gounelle, 1913

Genus of beetles

Hoplogrammicosum cinnamomeum is a species of beetle in the family Cerambycidae, the only species in the genus Hoplogrammicosum.
