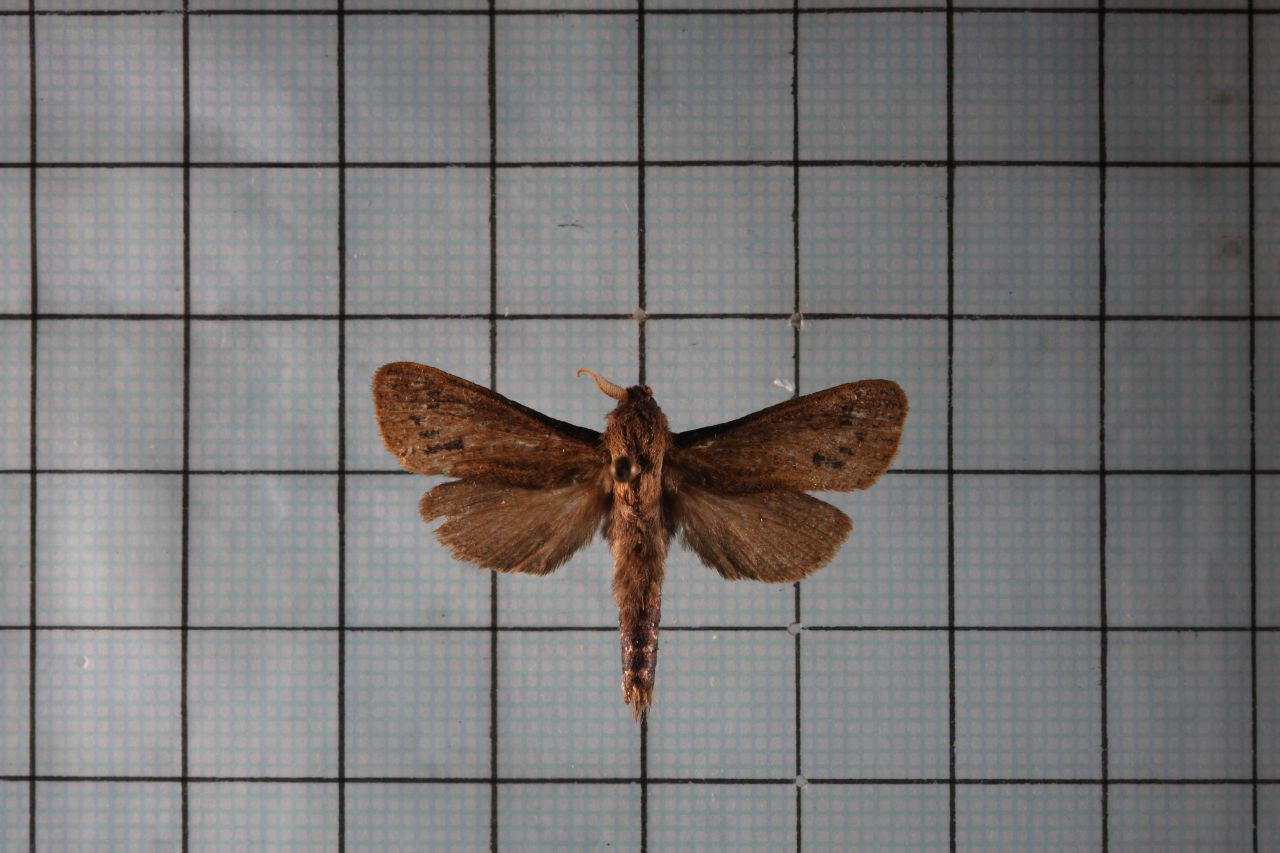

Scientific classification
- Domain: Eukaryota
- Kingdom: Animalia
- Phylum: Arthropoda
- Class: Insecta
- Order: Lepidoptera
- Family: Cossidae
- Genus: Phragmataecia
- Species: P. cinnamomea

Binomial name
- Phragmataecia cinnamomea Wileman, 1911

Synonyms
- Phragamataecia cinnamomea; Xyleutes hansi Strand, 1915

= Phragmataecia cinnamomea =

Species of moth

Phragmataecia cinnamomea is a species of moth of the family Cossidae. It is found in Taiwan and southern China (the Jianxi-Fujian border).
