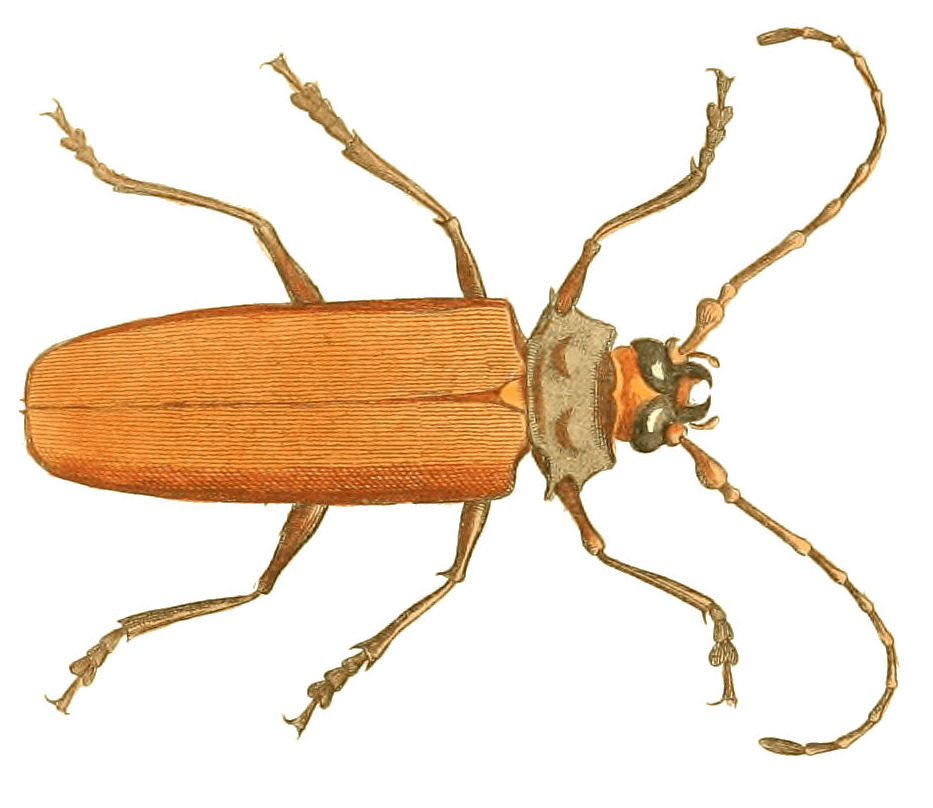

Scientific classification
- Kingdom: Animalia
- Phylum: Arthropoda
- Clade: Pancrustacea
- Class: Insecta
- Order: Coleoptera
- Suborder: Polyphaga
- Infraorder: Cucujiformia
- Family: Cerambycidae
- Genus: Orthomegas
- Species: O. cinnamomeus

Binomial name
- Orthomegas cinnamomeus (Linnaeus, 1758)

Synonyms
- Orthomegas cinctus Voet, 1778; Orthomegas corticanum Williams, 1929; Orthomegas corticinus Olivier, 1790; Orthomegas mucronatus Fabricius, 1775; Orthomegas spadiceus Dalman in Schoenherr, 1817

= Orthomegas cinnamomeus =

Species of beetle

Orthomegas cinnamomeus is a species of beetle in the genus Orthomegas of the family Cerambycidae. It was described by Carl Linnaeus in his landmark 1758 10th edition of Systema Naturae. It is found in Hispaniola, Trinidad, Colombia, Venezuela, the Guianas, Brazil, Ecuador, Peru and Bolivia.

== Description ==
General colour like that of cinnamon. Head covered with hair in front. Eyes black, extending almost round the head, being only separated both above and beneath by a narrow space. Antennae shorter than the body; flattened towards the tips. Thorax thin on the sides, and margined; having two spines, the posterior largest; and on the top are two round tubercles, covered with very short fine hairs or down. Scutellum small and rounded. Elytra margined deeply on the sides, but more faintly at the suture, extending beyond the anus; having a small spine at their extremities, where they are nearly as broad as at the thorax; clothed with exceedingly short fine hairs, as are likewise the abdomen and breast. Tibiae with two spurs. Body length 2 1/4 inches (57 mm).
