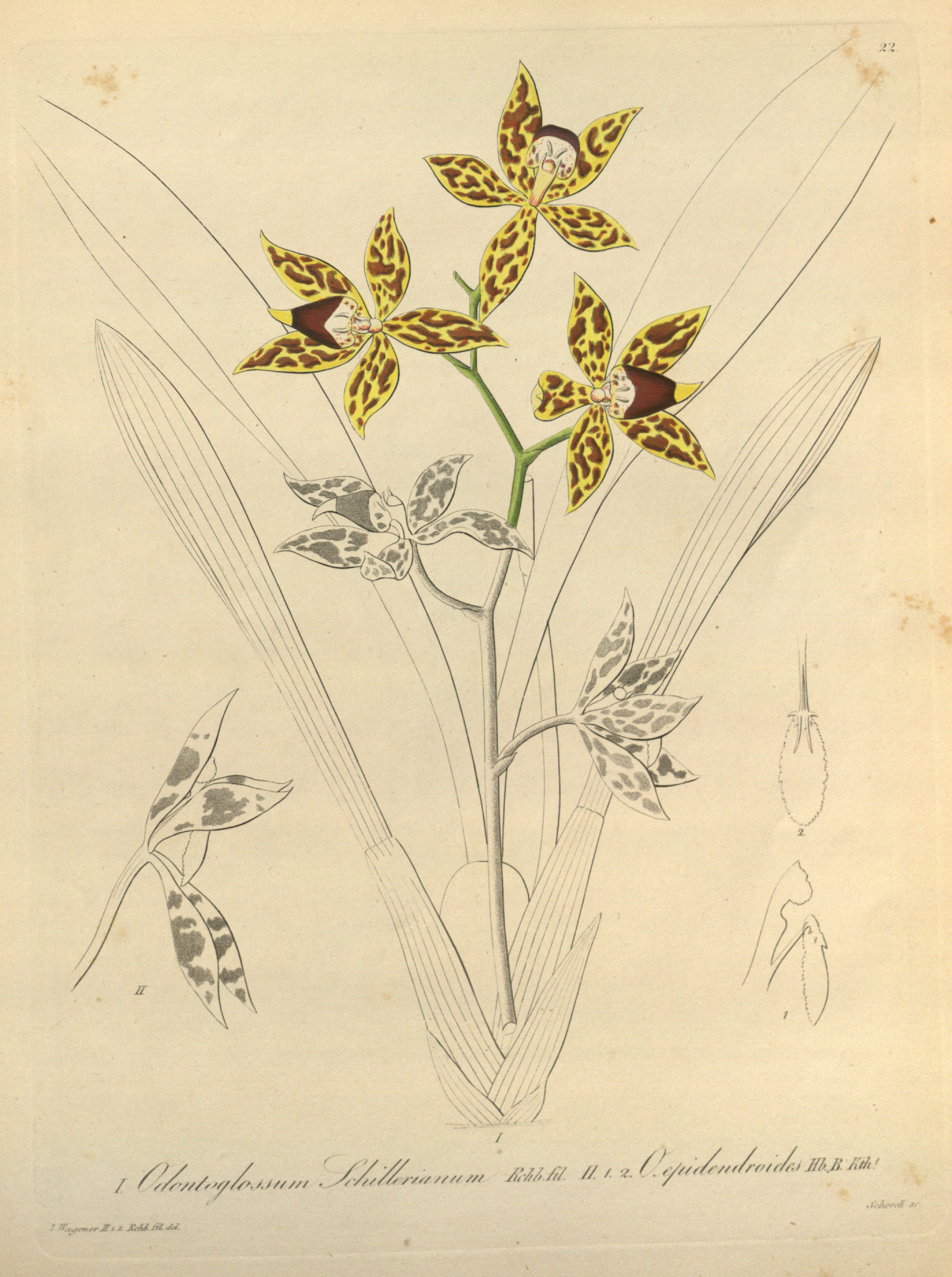

Scientific classification
- Kingdom: Plantae
- Clade: Tracheophytes
- Clade: Angiosperms
- Clade: Monocots
- Order: Asparagales
- Family: Orchidaceae
- Subfamily: Epidendroideae
- Genus: Oncidium
- Species: O. cinnamomeum

Binomial name
- Oncidium cinnamomeum Rchb.f.

Synonyms
- Odontoglossum cinnamomeum R.Warner & B.S.Williams; Odontoglossum schillerianum Rchb.f.

= Oncidium cinnamomeum =

Species of orchid

Oncidium cinnamomeum is a species of orchid endemic to northwestern Venezuela.
