= Solanum cinnamomeum =

Conservation status
- Conservation Dependent (IUCN 2.3)

Scientific classification
- Kingdom: Plantae
- Clade: Tracheophytes
- Clade: Angiosperms
- Clade: Eudicots
- Clade: Asterids
- Order: Solanales
- Family: Solanaceae
- Genus: Solanum
- Species: S. cinnamomeum

Binomial name
- Solanum cinnamomeum Sendtn.

Species of flowering plant

Solanum cinnamomeum is a species of flowering plant in the family Solanaceae. It is endemic to Brazil. Although considered to be at low risk of extinction, its survival depends on conservation.
