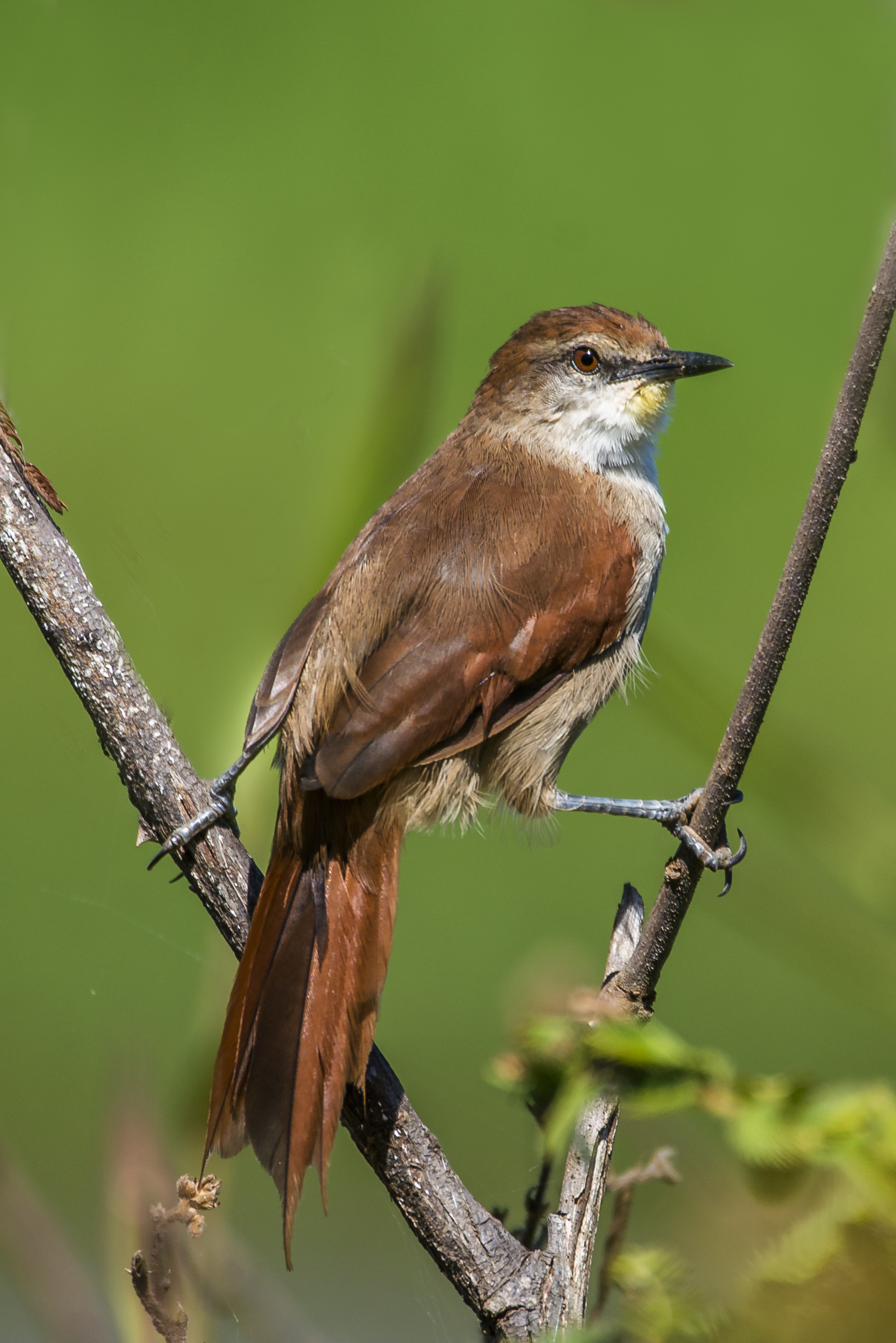
- In Brazil. Note spiny tail feathers.

Conservation status
- Least Concern (IUCN 3.1)

Scientific classification
- Kingdom: Animalia
- Phylum: Chordata
- Class: Aves
- Order: Passeriformes
- Family: Furnariidae
- Genus: Certhiaxis
- Species: C. cinnamomeus

Binomial name
- Certhiaxis cinnamomeus (Gmelin, JF, 1788)

Synonyms
- Certhiaxis cinnamomea (lapsus)

= Yellow-chinned spinetail =

Species of bird

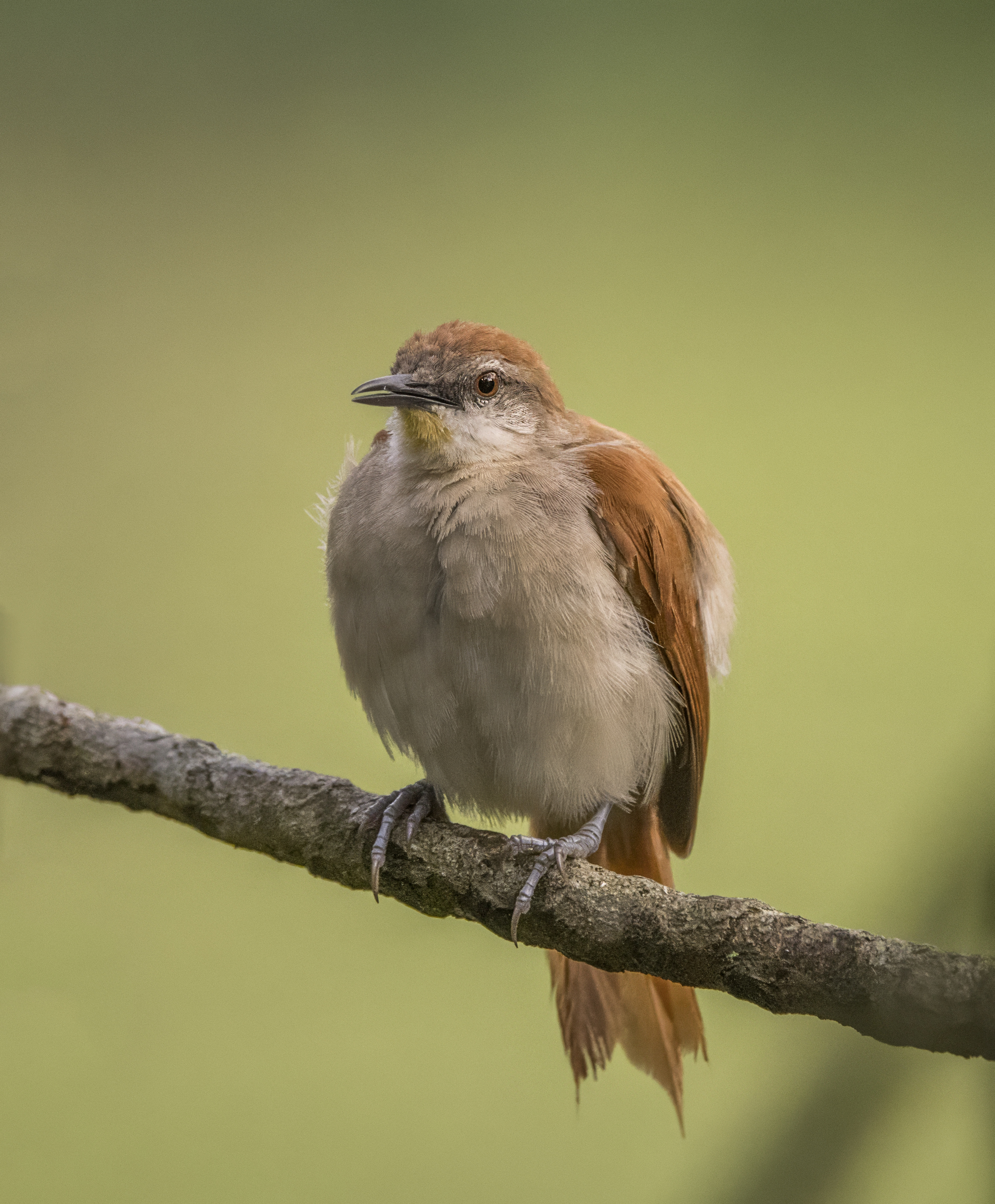
C. c. marabinus, Colombia

The yellow-chinned spinetail (Certhiaxis cinnamomeus) is a passerine bird found in the tropical New World from Trinidad and Colombia south to Argentina and Uruguay. It is a member of the South American ovenbird family Furnariidae.

== Taxonomy ==
The yellow-chinned spinetail was formally described in 1788 by the German naturalist Johann Friedrich Gmelin in his revised and expanded edition of Carl Linnaeus's Systema Naturae. He placed it with the treecreepers in the genus Certhia and coined the binomial name Certhia cinnamomea. The specific epithet is from Modern Latin cinnamomeus meaning "cinnamon-coloured". Gmelin based his description on the "Cinnamon creeper" that had been described in 1782 by the English ornithologist John Latham. Latham had examined a specimen in the British Museum. Latham did not specify the origin of the specimen but in 1902 Hans von Berlepsch and Ernst Hartert designated the type locality as Cayenne. The yellow-chinned spinetail is now placed with the red-and-white spinetail in the genus Certhiaxis that was introduced in 1844 by the French naturalist René Lesson.

Eight subspecies are recognised:

- C. c. fuscifrons (Madarász, G, 1913) – north Colombia
- C. c. marabinus Phelps, WH & Phelps, WH Jr, 1946 – northeast Colombia and northwest Venezuela
- C. c. valencianus Zimmer, JT & Phelps, WH, 1944 – central west Venezuela
- C. c. orenocensis Zimmer, JT, 1935 – Orinoco Valley (east Venezuela)
- C. c. cinnamomeus (Gmelin, JF, 1788) – Trinidad, northeast Venezuela, the Guianas and northeast Brazil
- C. c. pallidus Zimmer, JT, 1935 – southeast Colombia and west, central Amazonian Brazil
- C. c. cearensis (Cory, 1916) – east Brazil
- C. c. russeolus (Vieillot, 1817) – east Bolivia to southeast Brazil, Uruguay and north Argentina

== Description ==
The yellow-chinned spinetail is typically 15 cm long, and weighs 15 g. It is a slender bird with a long tail. The upperparts and head are chestnut brown, and the underparts are whitish apart from the pale yellow throat. The sexes are similar, but there are several subspecies, differing in forecrown colour or upperparts tone.

Its call is a shrill rattling.

== Distribution and habitat ==
The yellow-chinned spinetail is found in all contiguous regions of Brazil, except specific parts of the Amazon Basin. In northern South America, the species is mainly found along the coast, in a continuous coastal strip that extends from the mouth of the Amazon River's mouth through northern Brazil's Amapá state, the Guianas – extending to the headwaters of the south-flowing Branco River in the north central of Brazil's Roraima state as it borders the Guiana Highlands –, Venezuela, where its range extends more widely inland along the Orinoco River, to northern Colombia where it ranges up the Madeira River valley beyond the Serranía de las Quinchas.

Further south, like its sister species, the red-and-white spinetail (C. mustelinus) it is found along the Amazon River corridor. From the upper Amazon exiting the Andes, it only occurs in the river corridor, then bifurcating up the Madeira River, southwestwards into Bolivia. From there, it ranges along the Andean foothills to northwestern Argentina, Paraguay and Uruguay and finally the Rio de la Plata. It is apparently absent from much of Pará and northern Mato Grosso states, essentially between the Madeira and Araguaia River corridors. But apart from that region it occurs in most of South America in the area enclosed by – running counterclockwise – the lower Amazon and the Madeira River, the Andes, the Paraguay River and lower Paraná River, and the Atlantic Ocean.

This species is a common resident breeder in marshes and the edges of mangrove swamps; in general its habitat is open woodland in the vicinity of rivers. The yellow-chinned spinetail feeds on insects and spiders, keeping low and often in the open. It is a conspicuous, confiding and noisy bird. Unlike the related ovenbirds, the yellow-chinned spinetail constructs a large spherical stick nest, usually low in a mangrove or other marsh vegetation. The tubular entrance tunnel rises almost vertically from the base to the top of the nest. The normal clutch is three, sometimes four, greenish white eggs.

This spinetail is parasitised by the striped cuckoo (Tapera naevia), which lays one or two eggs in the nest, but it is not known how the cuckoo enters the nest or whether it or its offspring eject the host's young.

This widely ranging bird is not considered threatened by the IUCN.

== Sources ==
- ffrench, Richard; O'Neill, John Patton & Eckelberry, Don R. (1991): A guide to the birds of Trinidad and Tobago (2nd edition). Comstock Publishing, Ithaca, N.Y. ISBN 0-8014-9792-2
- Hilty, Steven L. (2003): Birds of Venezuela. Christopher Helm, London. ISBN 0-7136-6418-5
- Laverde-R., Oscar; Stiles, F. Gary & Múnera-R., Claudia (2005): Nuevos registros e inventario de la avifauna de la Serranía de las Quinchas, un área importante para la conservación de las aves (AICA) en Colombia [New records and updated inventory of the avifauna of the Serranía de las Quinchas, an important bird area (IBA) in Colombia]. Caldasia 27 (2): 247–265 [Spanish with English abstract]. PDF fulltext
