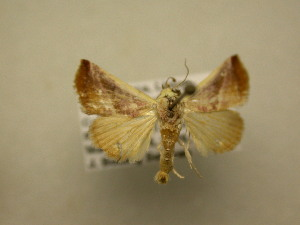

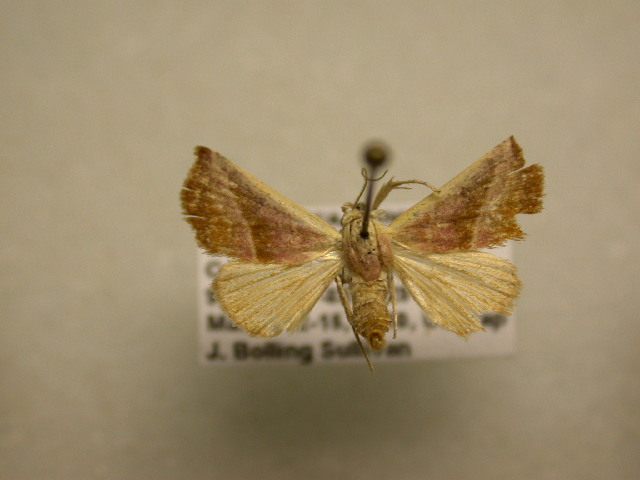

Scientific classification
- Domain: Eukaryota
- Kingdom: Animalia
- Phylum: Arthropoda
- Class: Insecta
- Order: Lepidoptera
- Superfamily: Noctuoidea
- Family: Erebidae
- Genus: Eublemma
- Species: E. cinnamomea

Binomial name
- Eublemma cinnamomea (Herrich-Schäffer, 1868)

Synonyms
- Trothisa cinnamomea Herrich-Schäffer, 1868; Eumestleta cinnamomea; Eublemma cinnamomeum; Trothisa (Thalpochares) margaritae Berg, 1882; Xanthoptera laphyra Druce, 1890; Eublemma rosescens Hampson, 1898; Eublemma subcinnamomea Strand, 1917

= Eublemma cinnamomea =

Species of moth

Eublemma cinnamomea is a species of moth of the family Erebidae first described by Gottlieb August Wilhelm Herrich-Schäffer in 1868. It is widespread in the New World tropics from the southern United States south to Argentina.

The wingspan is about 17 mm.
