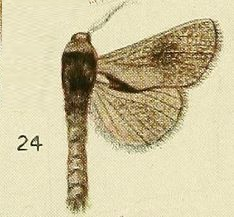
- Lebedodes naevius

Scientific classification
- Domain: Eukaryota
- Kingdom: Animalia
- Phylum: Arthropoda
- Class: Insecta
- Order: Lepidoptera
- Family: Cossidae
- Subfamily: Metarbelinae
- Genus: Lebedodes; Holland, 1893

Synonyms
- Catarbelana Bethune-Baker, 1908; Hollandella Gill, 1901; Hollandia Karsch, 1896; Lebododes Grünberg, 1911

= Lebedodes =

Genus of moths

Lebedodes is a genus of moths in the family Cossidae.

== Species ==
- Lebedodes bassa (Bethune-Baker, 1908)
- Lebedodes castanea Janse, 1925
- Lebedodes clathratus Grünberg, 1911
- Lebedodes cossula Holland, 1893
- Lebedodes endomela Bethune-Baker, 1909
- Lebedodes fraterna Gaede, 1929
- Lebedodes ianrobertsoni Lehmann, 2009
- Lebedodes jeanneli Le Cerf, 1914
- Lebedodes johni Lehmann, 2008
- Lebedodes leifaarviki Lehmann, 2009
- Lebedodes naevius Fawcett, 1916
- Lebedodes reticulata Gaede, 1929
- Lebedodes rufithorax Hampson, 1910
- Lebedodes schaeferi Grünberg, 1911
- Lebedodes velutina Le Cerf, 1914
- Lebedodes violascens Gaede, 1929
- Lebedodes wichgrafi Grünberg, 1910
- Lebedodes willihaberlandi Lehmann, 2008

== Former species ==
- Lebedodes fumealis Janse
- Lebedodes hintzi Grünberg, 1911
- Lebedodes natalica Hampson, 1910
