= Haberlandia isiroensis =

Scientific classification
- Kingdom: Animalia
- Phylum: Arthropoda
- Class: Insecta
- Order: Lepidoptera
- Family: Metarbelidae
- Genus: Haberlandia
- Species: H. isiroensis

Binomial name
- Haberlandia isiroensis Lehmann, 2011

Species of moth

Haberlandia isiroensis is a moth in the family Cossidae. It is found in the Democratic Republic of the Congo. The habitat consists of forests.

The wingspan is about 24.5 mm.
