= Mountelgonia pagana =

Scientific classification
- Domain: Eukaryota
- Kingdom: Animalia
- Phylum: Arthropoda
- Class: Insecta
- Order: Lepidoptera
- Family: Metarbelidae
- Genus: Mountelgonia
- Species: M. pagana

Binomial name
- Mountelgonia pagana (Strand, 1909)

Synonyms
- Metarbela pagana Strand, 1909

Species of moth

Mountelgonia pagana is a moth of the family Cossidae. It is found in north-eastern Rwanda. The habitat consists of a mosaic of wooded savanna, farmland and dry forests.

The wingspan is about 21.5 mm.
