= Haberlandia taiensis =

Scientific classification
- Domain: Eukaryota
- Kingdom: Animalia
- Phylum: Arthropoda
- Class: Insecta
- Order: Lepidoptera
- Family: Metarbelidae
- Genus: Haberlandia
- Species: H. taiensis

Binomial name
- Haberlandia taiensis Lehmann, 2011

Species of moth

Haberlandia taiensis is a moth in the family Cossidae. It is found in Ivory Coast. The habitat consists of lowland tropical rainforests.

The wingspan is about 19.5 mm.

== Etymology ==
The species is named for the type locality.
