= Haberlandia hulstaerti =

Scientific classification
- Kingdom: Animalia
- Phylum: Arthropoda
- Class: Insecta
- Order: Lepidoptera
- Family: Metarbelidae
- Genus: Haberlandia
- Species: H. hulstaerti

Binomial name
- Haberlandia hulstaerti Lehmann, 2011

Species of moth

Haberlandia hulstaerti is a moth in the family Cossidae. It is found in the Democratic Republic of the Congo.

The wingspan is about 21 mm.
