= Mountelgonia thikaensis =

Scientific classification
- Domain: Eukaryota
- Kingdom: Animalia
- Phylum: Arthropoda
- Class: Insecta
- Order: Lepidoptera
- Family: Metarbelidae
- Genus: Mountelgonia
- Species: M. thikaensis

Binomial name
- Mountelgonia thikaensis Lehmann, 2013

Species of moth

Mountelgonia thikaensis is a moth of the family Cossidae. It is found east of the eastern Great Rift Valley in the central highlands of Kenya. The habitat consists of a mosaic of scattered tree grassland and riverine forests.

The wingspan is about 20 mm.

== Etymology ==
The species is named after Thika, Kenya.
