= Shimonia timberlakei =

Scientific classification
- Kingdom: Animalia
- Phylum: Arthropoda
- Class: Insecta
- Order: Lepidoptera
- Family: Metarbelidae
- Genus: Shimonia
- Species: S. timberlakei

Binomial name
- Shimonia timberlakei Lehmann & Rajaei, 2013

Species of moth

Shimonia timberlakei is a moth in the family Cossidae. It is found in the Democratic Republic of Congo, where it has been recorded from Eala.

The wingspan is 38 mm for males and 41 mm for females.

== Etymology ==
The species is named after Jonathan Timberlake, the editor of Flora Zambesiaca.
