= Shimonia fischeri =

Scientific classification
- Kingdom: Animalia
- Phylum: Arthropoda
- Class: Insecta
- Order: Lepidoptera
- Family: Metarbelidae
- Genus: Shimonia
- Species: S. fischeri

Binomial name
- Shimonia fischeri Lehmann & Rajaei, 2013

Species of moth

Shimonia fischeri is a moth in the family Cossidae. It is found in the Democratic Republic of the Congo, where it has been recorded from south-eastern region of the Congo Basin.

The wingspan is 45 mm for females.

== Etymology ==
The species is named in honour of botanist Professor Dr. Eberhard Fischer.
