= Haberlandia legraini =

Scientific classification
- Domain: Eukaryota
- Kingdom: Animalia
- Phylum: Arthropoda
- Class: Insecta
- Order: Lepidoptera
- Family: Metarbelidae
- Genus: Haberlandia
- Species: H. legraini

Binomial name
- Haberlandia legraini Lehmann, 2011

Species of moth

Haberlandia legraini is a moth in the family Cossidae. It is found in the Republic of Congo and possibly eastern Gabon. The habitat consists of swamp forests and riparian forests.

The wingspan is about 21 mm.
