= Haberlandia hilaryae =

Scientific classification
- Kingdom: Animalia
- Phylum: Arthropoda
- Class: Insecta
- Order: Lepidoptera
- Family: Metarbelidae
- Genus: Haberlandia
- Species: H. hilaryae

Binomial name
- Haberlandia hilaryae Lehmann, 2011

Species of moth

Haberlandia hilaryae is a moth in the family Cossidae. It is found in southern Cameroon. The habitat consists of drier types of lowland tropical rainforests.

The wingspan is about 16 mm.
