= Haberlandia lindacammae =

Scientific classification
- Domain: Eukaryota
- Kingdom: Animalia
- Phylum: Arthropoda
- Class: Insecta
- Order: Lepidoptera
- Family: Metarbelidae
- Genus: Haberlandia
- Species: H. lindacammae

Binomial name
- Haberlandia lindacammae Lehmann, 2011

Species of moth

Haberlandia lindacammae is a moth in the family Cossidae. It is found in Gabon, where it has been recorded from the Lopé Faunal Reserve and Bambidie logging camp. The habitat consists of forests.

The wingspan is about 23 mm for males and 27 mm for females.
