= Shimonia oyiekeae =

Scientific classification
- Kingdom: Animalia
- Phylum: Arthropoda
- Class: Insecta
- Order: Lepidoptera
- Family: Metarbelidae
- Genus: Shimonia
- Species: S. oyiekeae

Binomial name
- Shimonia oyiekeae Lehmann & Rajaei, 2013

Species of moth

Shimonia oyiekeae is a moth in the family Cossidae. It is found in the Democratic Republic of the Congo, where it has been recorded from Lubumbashi and Kolwezi.

The wingspan is 37 mm.
