= Haberlandia isakaensis =

Scientific classification
- Kingdom: Animalia
- Phylum: Arthropoda
- Class: Insecta
- Order: Lepidoptera
- Family: Metarbelidae
- Genus: Haberlandia
- Species: H. isakaensis

Binomial name
- Haberlandia isakaensis Lehmann, 2011

Species of moth

Haberlandia isakaensis is a moth in the family Cossidae. It is found in the Democratic Republic of Congo. The habitat consists of lowland rainforests.

The wingspan is about 21 mm.

== Etymology ==
The species is named for Isaka, the type locality.
