= Haberlandia clenchi =

Scientific classification
- Kingdom: Animalia
- Phylum: Arthropoda
- Class: Insecta
- Order: Lepidoptera
- Family: Metarbelidae
- Genus: Haberlandia
- Species: H. clenchi

Binomial name
- Haberlandia clenchi Lehmann, 2011

Species of moth

Haberlandia clenchi is a moth in the family Cossidae. It is found in the Democratic Republic of Congo. The habitat consists of a mosaic of open water, marshland, swamp forests, seasonally flooded forests and levee forests.

The wingspan is about 25 mm.
