= Mountelgonia abercornensis =

Scientific classification
- Kingdom: Animalia
- Phylum: Arthropoda
- Class: Insecta
- Order: Lepidoptera
- Family: Metarbelidae
- Genus: Mountelgonia
- Species: M. abercornensis

Binomial name
- Mountelgonia abercornensis Lehmann, 2013

Species of moth

Mountelgonia abercornensis is a moth of the family Cossidae. It is found in north-eastern Zambia. The habitat consists of woodland mosaic at high elevations.

The wingspan is about 25 mm.

The species is named after the type locality of Abercorn (now Mbala, Zambia).
