= Haberlandia janzi =

Scientific classification
- Domain: Eukaryota
- Kingdom: Animalia
- Phylum: Arthropoda
- Class: Insecta
- Order: Lepidoptera
- Family: Metarbelidae
- Genus: Haberlandia
- Species: H. janzi

Binomial name
- Haberlandia janzi Lehmann, 2011

Species of moth

Haberlandia janzi is a moth in the family Cossidae. It is found in Ivory Coast. The habitat consists of semi-deciduous forests.

The wingspan is about 18 mm.

== Etymology ==
The species is named in honour of André Janz.
