= Haberlandia josephi =

Scientific classification
- Kingdom: Animalia
- Phylum: Arthropoda
- Class: Insecta
- Order: Lepidoptera
- Family: Metarbelidae
- Genus: Haberlandia
- Species: H. josephi

Binomial name
- Haberlandia josephi Lehmann, 2011

Species of moth

Haberlandia josephi is a moth in the family Cossidae. It is found in the Democratic Republic of Congo. The habitat consists of rainforests.

The wingspan is about 28.5 mm.

== Etymology ==
The species is named in honour of Joseph Mugambi Ruthiiri.
