= Haberlandia togoensis =

Scientific classification
- Domain: Eukaryota
- Kingdom: Animalia
- Phylum: Arthropoda
- Class: Insecta
- Order: Lepidoptera
- Family: Metarbelidae
- Genus: Haberlandia
- Species: H. togoensis

Binomial name
- Haberlandia togoensis Lehmann, 2011

Species of moth

Haberlandia togoensis is a moth in the family Cossidae. It is found in central Togo.

The wingspan is about 18 mm. The forewings are warm buff with ecru-olive lines towards the dorsum. The hindwings are colonial buff with a reticulated buffy olive pattern.

== Etymology ==
The species is named for the country Togo, the type locality.
