= Haberlandia otfriedi =

Scientific classification
- Domain: Eukaryota
- Kingdom: Animalia
- Phylum: Arthropoda
- Class: Insecta
- Order: Lepidoptera
- Family: Metarbelidae
- Genus: Haberlandia
- Species: H. otfriedi

Binomial name
- Haberlandia otfriedi Lehmann, 2011

Species of moth

Haberlandia otfriedi is a moth in the family Cossidae. It is found in Ghana. The habitat consists of rainforests.

The wingspan is about 17 mm for males and 20 mm for females.

== Etymology ==
The species is named in honour of Dr Otfried Lange.
