= Mountelgonia percivali =

Scientific classification
- Domain: Eukaryota
- Kingdom: Animalia
- Phylum: Arthropoda
- Class: Insecta
- Order: Lepidoptera
- Family: Metarbelidae
- Genus: Mountelgonia
- Species: M. percivali

Binomial name
- Mountelgonia percivali Lehmann, 2013

Species of moth

Mountelgonia percivali is a moth of the family Cossidae. It is found from the areas east of the summits of Mount Elgon to the western highlands of Kenya. It is probably also found on the western side of Mount Elgon in Uganda. The habitat consists of dry Afromontane forest at high altitudes.

The wingspan is about 22 mm for males and 26.5 mm for females.
