= Haberlandia odzalaensis =

Scientific classification
- Domain: Eukaryota
- Kingdom: Animalia
- Phylum: Arthropoda
- Class: Insecta
- Order: Lepidoptera
- Family: Metarbelidae
- Genus: Haberlandia
- Species: H. odzalaensis

Binomial name
- Haberlandia odzalaensis Lehmann, 2011

Species of moth

Haberlandia odzalaensis is a moth in the family Cossidae. It is found in the Republic of the Congo and the Central African Republic, but might also be present in south-eastern Cameroon and the north-western Democratic Republic of the Congo. The habitat consists of forests.
