= Haberlandia rudolphi =

Scientific classification
- Kingdom: Animalia
- Phylum: Arthropoda
- Class: Insecta
- Order: Lepidoptera
- Family: Metarbelidae
- Genus: Haberlandia
- Species: H. rudolphi

Binomial name
- Haberlandia rudolphi Lehmann, 2011

Species of moth

Haberlandia rudolphi is a moth in the family Cossidae. It is found in the Democratic Republic of Congo. The habitat consists of lowland rainforests.

The wingspan is about 27.5 mm. The fore- and hindwings are deep colonial buff.

== Etymology ==
The species is named for Werner Rudolph, a friend of the author.
