= Haberlandia hollowayi =

Scientific classification
- Domain: Eukaryota
- Kingdom: Animalia
- Phylum: Arthropoda
- Class: Insecta
- Order: Lepidoptera
- Family: Metarbelidae
- Genus: Haberlandia
- Species: H. hollowayi

Binomial name
- Haberlandia hollowayi Lehmann, 2011

Species of moth

Haberlandia hollowayi is a moth in the family Cossidae. It is found in the Ivory Coast. The habitat consists of coastal forests and swamp forests.

The wingspan is about 17.5 mm.

== Etymology ==
The species is named in honour of Dr Jeremy Holloway.
