= Haberlandia annetteae =

Scientific classification
- Domain: Eukaryota
- Kingdom: Animalia
- Phylum: Arthropoda
- Class: Insecta
- Order: Lepidoptera
- Family: Metarbelidae
- Genus: Haberlandia
- Species: H. annetteae

Binomial name
- Haberlandia annetteae Lehmann, 2011

Species of moth

Haberlandia annetteae is a moth in the family Cossidae. It is found in the Central African Republic and possibly south-eastern Cameroon. The habitat consists of rainforests.

The wingspan is about 22 mm for males and 27 mm for females.

== Etymology ==
The species is named in honour of Annette Groß, a friend of the author.
