= Lebedodes willihaberlandi =

Scientific classification
- Kingdom: Animalia
- Phylum: Arthropoda
- Class: Insecta
- Order: Lepidoptera
- Family: Cossidae
- Genus: Lebedodes
- Species: L. willihaberlandi

Binomial name
- Lebedodes willihaberlandi Lehmann, 2008

Species of moth

Lebedodes willihaberlandi is a moth in the family Metarbelidae. It is found in Tanzania, where it has been recorded from the Mufindi Forests. The habitat consists of montane and upper montane woodlands and bushland.

The length of the forewings is about 12.5 mm.

== Etymology ==
The species is named for Willi Eduard Haberland, the grandfather of the author.
