= Haberlandia rohdei =

Scientific classification
- Domain: Eukaryota
- Kingdom: Animalia
- Phylum: Arthropoda
- Class: Insecta
- Order: Lepidoptera
- Family: Metarbelidae
- Genus: Haberlandia
- Species: H. rohdei

Binomial name
- Haberlandia rohdei Lehmann, 2011

Species of moth

Haberlandia rohdei is a moth in the family Cossidae. It is found in Ghana. The habitat consists of rainforests.

The wingspan is about 17 mm.
