= Shimonia splendida =

Scientific classification
- Domain: Eukaryota
- Kingdom: Animalia
- Phylum: Arthropoda
- Class: Insecta
- Order: Lepidoptera
- Family: Metarbelidae
- Genus: Shimonia
- Species: S. splendida

Binomial name
- Shimonia splendida (D. S. Fletcher, 1968)

Synonyms
- Metarbela splendida D. S. Fletcher, 1968

Species of moth

Shimonia splendida is a moth in the family Cossidae. It was described by David Stephen Fletcher in 1968. It is found in the north-eastern part of Democratic Republic of the Congo and western Uganda.
