= Mountelgonia urundiensis =

Scientific classification
- Domain: Eukaryota
- Kingdom: Animalia
- Phylum: Arthropoda
- Class: Insecta
- Order: Lepidoptera
- Family: Metarbelidae
- Genus: Mountelgonia
- Species: M. urundiensis

Binomial name
- Mountelgonia urundiensis Lehmann, 2013

Species of moth

Mountelgonia urundiensis is a moth of the family Cossidae. It is found on the high central plateau of Burundi. The habitat consists of forest/woodland mosaic with riverine forests at high elevations.

The wingspan is about 21 mm.
