= Haberlandia entebbeensis =

Scientific classification
- Domain: Eukaryota
- Kingdom: Animalia
- Phylum: Arthropoda
- Class: Insecta
- Order: Lepidoptera
- Family: Metarbelidae
- Genus: Haberlandia
- Species: H. entebbeensis

Binomial name
- Haberlandia entebbeensis Lehmann, 2011

Species of moth

Haberlandia entebbeensis is a moth in the family Cossidae. It is found in Uganda. The habitat consists of lowland rainforests.

The wingspan is about 23 mm.

== Etymology ==
The species is named for Entebbe, the type locality.
