= Mountelgonia arcifera =

Scientific classification
- Kingdom: Animalia
- Phylum: Arthropoda
- Class: Insecta
- Order: Lepidoptera
- Family: Metarbelidae
- Genus: Mountelgonia
- Species: M. arcifera

Binomial name
- Mountelgonia arcifera (Hampson, 1909)

Synonyms
- Marshalliana arcifera Hampson, 1909; Metarbela pallescens Le Cerf, 1914

Species of moth

Mountelgonia arcifera is a moth of the family Metarbelidae. It is found in southern Kenya and north-central Tanzania. The habitat consists of open grasslands with shrubs and/or trees at medium to high elevations.

The wingspan is about 24 mm for males and 26.5 mm for females.
