= Haberlandia shimonii =

Scientific classification
- Domain: Eukaryota
- Kingdom: Animalia
- Phylum: Arthropoda
- Class: Insecta
- Order: Lepidoptera
- Family: Metarbelidae
- Genus: Haberlandia
- Species: H. shimonii

Binomial name
- Haberlandia shimonii Lehmann, 2011

Species of moth

Haberlandia shimonii is a moth in the family Cossidae. It is found in north-eastern Gabon. The habitat consists of swamp, riparian and mixed leguminous forest types.

The wingspan is about 23 mm.
