= Haberlandia rabiusi =

Scientific classification
- Domain: Eukaryota
- Kingdom: Animalia
- Phylum: Arthropoda
- Class: Insecta
- Order: Lepidoptera
- Family: Metarbelidae
- Genus: Haberlandia
- Species: H. rabiusi

Binomial name
- Haberlandia rabiusi Lehmann, 2011

Species of moth

Haberlandia rabiusi is a moth in the family Cossidae. It is found in Sierra Leone. The habitat consists of lowland tropical rainforests.

The wingspan is about 21.5 mm.
