= Haberlandia lusamboensis =

Scientific classification
- Domain: Eukaryota
- Kingdom: Animalia
- Phylum: Arthropoda
- Class: Insecta
- Order: Lepidoptera
- Family: Metarbelidae
- Genus: Haberlandia
- Species: H. lusamboensis

Binomial name
- Haberlandia lusamboensis Lehmann, 2011

Species of moth

Haberlandia lusamboensis is a moth in the family Cossidae. It is found in Lusambo and Katakokombe in the Democratic Republic of the Congo into the south-eastern Republic of the Congo. The habitat consists of moist and drier types of lowland rainforests.

The wingspan is about 23.5 mm for males and 27.5 mm for females.

== Etymology ==
The species is named for Lusambo, the type locality.
