= Mountelgonia lumbuaensis =

Scientific classification
- Domain: Eukaryota
- Kingdom: Animalia
- Phylum: Arthropoda
- Class: Insecta
- Order: Lepidoptera
- Family: Metarbelidae
- Genus: Mountelgonia
- Species: M. lumbuaensis

Binomial name
- Mountelgonia lumbuaensis Lehmann, 2013

Species of moth

Mountelgonia lumbuaensis is a moth of the family Cossidae. It is found in the Mau Forest complex in the south-western highlands of Kenya. The habitat consists of both wet and dry Afromontane forest at high altitudes.

The wingspan is about 24 mm.

== Etymology ==
The species is named after Lumbua, Kenya.
