= Saalmulleria stumpffi =

Scientific classification
- Kingdom: Animalia
- Phylum: Arthropoda
- Class: Insecta
- Order: Lepidoptera
- Family: Cossidae
- Genus: Saalmulleria
- Species: S. stumpffi

Binomial name
- Saalmulleria stumpffi (Saalmüller, 1884)

Synonyms
- Cossus stumpffi Saalmüller, 1884

Species of moth

Saalmulleria stumpffi is a moth in the family Cossidae. It is found in Madagascar.
