= Encaumaptera =

Scientific classification
- Kingdom: Animalia
- Phylum: Arthropoda
- Class: Insecta
- Order: Lepidoptera
- Family: Cossidae
- Subfamily: Metarbelinae
- Genus: Encaumaptera; Hampson, 1892
- Species: E. stigmata

Binomial name
- Encaumaptera stigmata Hampson, 1893

Species of moth

Encaumaptera stigmata is a moth in the family Cossidae, and the only species in the genus Encaumaptera. It is found in India.
