= Lebedodes bassa =

Scientific classification
- Domain: Eukaryota
- Kingdom: Animalia
- Phylum: Arthropoda
- Class: Insecta
- Order: Lepidoptera
- Family: Cossidae
- Genus: Lebedodes
- Species: L. bassa

Binomial name
- Lebedodes bassa (Bethune-Baker, 1908)

Synonyms
- Catarbelana bassa Bethune-Baker, 1908; Hollandia togoica Karsch, 1896

Species of moth

Lebedodes bassa is a moth in the family Cossidae. It is found in Nigeria and Togo.
