= Bjoernstadia =

Scientific classification
- Kingdom: Animalia
- Phylum: Arthropoda
- Class: Insecta
- Order: Lepidoptera
- Family: Cossidae
- Subfamily: Metarbelinae
- Genus: Bjoernstadia; Lehmann, 2012
- Species: B. kasuluensis

Binomial name
- Bjoernstadia kasuluensis Lehmann, 2012

Species of moth

Bjoernstadia kasuluensis is a moth in the family Cossidae, and the only species in the genus Bjoernstadia. It is found in the Albertine Rift region of Tanzania.
