= Stenagra =

Scientific classification
- Kingdom: Animalia
- Phylum: Arthropoda
- Class: Insecta
- Order: Lepidoptera
- Family: Cossidae
- Subfamily: Metarbelinae
- Genus: Stenagra; Hampson, 1920
- Species: S. multipunctata

Binomial name
- Stenagra multipunctata Hampson, 1920

Species of moth

Stenagra multipunctata is a moth in the family Cossidae, and the only species in the genus Stenagra. It is found in Nigeria.
