= Lebedodes castanea =

Scientific classification
- Domain: Eukaryota
- Kingdom: Animalia
- Phylum: Arthropoda
- Class: Insecta
- Order: Lepidoptera
- Family: Cossidae
- Genus: Lebedodes
- Species: L. castanea

Binomial name
- Lebedodes castanea Janse, 1925

Species of moth

Lebedodes castanea is a moth in the family Cossidae. It is found in South Africa.
