= Lebedodes reticulata =

Scientific classification
- Domain: Eukaryota
- Kingdom: Animalia
- Phylum: Arthropoda
- Class: Insecta
- Order: Lepidoptera
- Family: Cossidae
- Genus: Lebedodes
- Species: L. reticulata

Binomial name
- Lebedodes reticulata Gaede, 1929

Species of moth

Lebedodes reticulata is a moth in the family Cossidae. It is found in South Africa.
