= Mountelgonia =

Scientific classification
- Domain: Eukaryota
- Kingdom: Animalia
- Phylum: Arthropoda
- Class: Insecta
- Order: Lepidoptera
- Family: Metarbelidae
- Genus: Mountelgonia; Lehmann, 2013

Species
- See text

Genus of moths

Mountelgonia is a genus of moths belonging to the family Cossidae, Metarbelidae.

== Distribution ==
The known species of this genus are found in Central & Eastern Africa (Kenya, Burundi, Rwanda, Tanzania and Zambia).

== Species ==
- Mountelgonia percivali Lehmann, 2013 (Kenya)
- Mountelgonia lumbuaensis Lehmann, 2013 (Kenya)
- Mountelgonia arcifera (Hampson, 1909), (Kenya & Tanzania)
- Mountelgonia abercornensis Lehmann, 2013 (Zambia)
- Mountelgonia thikaensis Lehmann, 2013 (Kenya)
- Mountelgonia pagana (Strand, 1909) (Rwanda)
- Mountelgonia urundiensis Lehmann, 2013 (Burundi)
