= Saalmulleria dubiefi =

Scientific classification
- Domain: Eukaryota
- Kingdom: Animalia
- Phylum: Arthropoda
- Class: Insecta
- Order: Lepidoptera
- Family: Cossidae
- Genus: Saalmulleria
- Species: S. dubiefi

Binomial name
- Saalmulleria dubiefi Viette, 1974

Species of moth

Saalmulleria dubiefi is a moth in the family Cossidae. It is found in Madagascar.
