= Lebedodes cossula =

Scientific classification
- Domain: Eukaryota
- Kingdom: Animalia
- Phylum: Arthropoda
- Class: Insecta
- Order: Lepidoptera
- Family: Cossidae
- Genus: Lebedodes
- Species: L. cossula

Binomial name
- Lebedodes cossula Holland, 1893

Species of moth

Lebedodes cossula is a moth in the family Cossidae. It is found in the Central African Republic and Equatorial Guinea.
