= Haberlandia =

Scientific classification
- Domain: Eukaryota
- Kingdom: Animalia
- Phylum: Arthropoda
- Class: Insecta
- Order: Lepidoptera
- Family: Metarbelidae
- Genus: Haberlandia; Lehmann, 2011

Species
- See text

Genus of moths

Haberlandia is a genus of moths in the family Metarbelidae.

== Species ==
- Haberlandia annetteae Lehmann, 2011
- Haberlandia clenchi Lehmann, 2011
- Haberlandia entebbeensis Lehmann, 2011
- Haberlandia hilaryae Lehmann, 2011
- Haberlandia hintzi (Grünberg, 1911)
- Haberlandia hollowayi Lehmann, 2011
- Haberlandia hulstaerti Lehmann, 2011
- Haberlandia isakaensis Lehmann, 2011
- Haberlandia isiroensis Lehmann, 2011
- Haberlandia janzi Lehmann, 2011
- Haberlandia josephi Lehmann, 2011
- Haberlandia legraini Lehmann, 2011
- Haberlandia lindacammae Lehmann, 2011
- Haberlandia lusamboensis Lehmann, 2011
- Haberlandia odzalaensis Lehmann, 2011
- Haberlandia otfriedi Lehmann, 2011
- Haberlandia rabiusi Lehmann, 2011
- Haberlandia rohdei Lehmann, 2011
- Haberlandia rudolphi Lehmann, 2011
- Haberlandia shimonii Lehmann, 2011
- Haberlandia taiensis Lehmann, 2011
- Haberlandia tempeli Lehmann, 2011
- Haberlandia togoensis Lehmann, 2011
- Haberlandia ueleensis Lehmann, 2011

== Etymology ==
The genus is named in honour of the grandparents of the author, Eduard Willi Haberland and his wife Charlotte Marie Johanna, née Quitter, who died on 26 December 2010.
