= Subarchaeopacha =

Scientific classification
- Kingdom: Animalia
- Phylum: Arthropoda
- Class: Insecta
- Order: Lepidoptera
- Family: Cossidae
- Subfamily: Metarbelinae
- Genus: Subarchaeopacha; Dufrane, 1945
- Species: S. alberici

Binomial name
- Subarchaeopacha alberici Dufrane, 1945

Species of moth

Subarchaeopacha alberici is a moth in the family Cossidae, and the only species in the genus Subarchaeopacha. It is found in the Democratic Republic of Congo.
