= Squamicapilla =

Scientific classification
- Kingdom: Animalia
- Phylum: Arthropoda
- Class: Insecta
- Order: Lepidoptera
- Family: Cossidae
- Subfamily: Metarbelinae
- Genus: Squamicapilla; Schultze, 1908
- Species: S. arenata

Binomial name
- Squamicapilla arenata Schultze, 1908

Species of moth

Squamicapilla arenata is a moth in the family Cossidae, and the only species in the genus Squamicapilla. It is found in the Philippines.
