= Lebedodes johni =

Scientific classification
- Domain: Eukaryota
- Kingdom: Animalia
- Phylum: Arthropoda
- Class: Insecta
- Order: Lepidoptera
- Family: Cossidae
- Genus: Lebedodes
- Species: L. johni

Binomial name
- Lebedodes johni Lehmann, 2008

Species of moth

Lebedodes johni is a moth in the family Cossidae. It is found in Kenya, where it has been recorded from Arabuko-Sokoke. The habitat consists of legume-dominated lowland woodlands.

The length of the forewings is about 11 mm.

== Etymology ==
The species is named for John Albert Jones.
