= Lebedodes ianrobertsoni =

Scientific classification
- Kingdom: Animalia
- Phylum: Arthropoda
- Class: Insecta
- Order: Lepidoptera
- Family: Cossidae
- Genus: Lebedodes
- Species: L. ianrobertsoni

Binomial name
- Lebedodes ianrobertsoni Lehmann, 2009

Species of moth

Lebedodes ianrobertsoni is a moth in the family Cossidae. It is found in Tanzania, where it has been recorded from the central subregion of the Eastern Arc Mountains probably extending further east into the drier coastal forests.

The length of the forewings is about 9 mm.

== Etymology ==
The species is named for Ian Robertson.
