= Kroonia adamauensis =

Scientific classification
- Kingdom: Animalia
- Phylum: Arthropoda
- Class: Insecta
- Order: Lepidoptera
- Family: Cossidae
- Genus: Kroonia
- Species: K. adamauensis

Binomial name
- Kroonia adamauensis Lehmann, 2010

Species of moth

Kroonia adamauensis is a moth in the family Cossidae. It is found in Cameroon.
