= Kroonia murphyi =

Scientific classification
- Kingdom: Animalia
- Phylum: Arthropoda
- Class: Insecta
- Order: Lepidoptera
- Family: Cossidae
- Genus: Kroonia
- Species: K. murphyi

Binomial name
- Kroonia murphyi Lehmann, 2010

Species of moth

Kroonia murphyi is a moth in the family Cossidae. It is found in Malawi and Tanzania.
