= Lebedodes wichgrafi =

Scientific classification
- Domain: Eukaryota
- Kingdom: Animalia
- Phylum: Arthropoda
- Class: Insecta
- Order: Lepidoptera
- Family: Cossidae
- Genus: Lebedodes
- Species: L. wichgrafi

Binomial name
- Lebedodes wichgrafi (Grünberg, 1910)

Synonyms
- Hollandella wichgrafi Grünberg, 1910; Lebedodes durbanica Hampson, 1910

Species of moth

Lebedodes wichgrafi is a moth in the family Cossidae. It is found in Ivory Coast, Senegal and South Africa.
