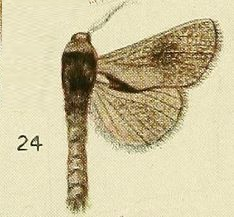

Scientific classification
- Domain: Eukaryota
- Kingdom: Animalia
- Phylum: Arthropoda
- Class: Insecta
- Order: Lepidoptera
- Family: Cossidae
- Genus: Lebedodes
- Species: L. naevius

Binomial name
- Lebedodes naevius Fawcett, 1916

= Lebedodes naevius =

Species of moth

Lebedodes naevius is a moth in the family Cossidae. It is found in Kenya.
