= Lebedodes violascens =

Scientific classification
- Kingdom: Animalia
- Phylum: Arthropoda
- Class: Insecta
- Order: Lepidoptera
- Family: Cossidae
- Genus: Lebedodes
- Species: L. violascens

Binomial name
- Lebedodes violascens Gaede, 1929

Species of moth

Lebedodes violascens is a moth in the family Cossidae. It is found in Tanzania.
