= Lebedodes jeanneli =

Scientific classification
- Kingdom: Animalia
- Phylum: Arthropoda
- Class: Insecta
- Order: Lepidoptera
- Family: Cossidae
- Genus: Lebedodes
- Species: L. jeanneli

Binomial name
- Lebedodes jeanneli Le Cerf, 1914

Species of moth

Lebedodes jeanneli is a moth in the family Cossidae. It is found in Tanzania.
