= Lebedodes velutina =

Scientific classification
- Domain: Eukaryota
- Kingdom: Animalia
- Phylum: Arthropoda
- Class: Insecta
- Order: Lepidoptera
- Family: Cossidae
- Genus: Lebedodes
- Species: L. velutina

Binomial name
- Lebedodes velutina Le Cerf, 1914

Species of moth

Lebedodes velutina is a moth in the family Cossidae. It is found in Kenya.
