= Haberlandia hintzi =

Scientific classification
- Kingdom: Animalia
- Phylum: Arthropoda
- Class: Insecta
- Order: Lepidoptera
- Family: Metarbelidae
- Genus: Haberlandia
- Species: H. hintzi

Binomial name
- Haberlandia hintzi (Grünberg, 1911)

Synonyms
- Lebedodes hintzi Grünberg, 1911

Species of moth

Haberlandia hintzi is a moth in the family Cossidae. It is found in Cameroon. The habitat consists of evergreen coastal rainforests.

The wingspan is about 24 mm.
