= Lebedodes leifaarviki =

Scientific classification
- Kingdom: Animalia
- Phylum: Arthropoda
- Class: Insecta
- Order: Lepidoptera
- Family: Cossidae
- Genus: Lebedodes
- Species: L. leifaarviki

Binomial name
- Lebedodes leifaarviki Lehmann, 2009

Species of moth

Lebedodes leifaarviki is a moth in the family Cossidae. It is found in Tanzania, where it has been recorded from the central subregion of the Eastern Arc Mountains.

== Etymology ==
The species is named for Leif Aarvik.
