= Lebedodes rufithorax =

Scientific classification
- Kingdom: Animalia
- Phylum: Arthropoda
- Class: Insecta
- Order: Lepidoptera
- Family: Cossidae
- Genus: Lebedodes
- Species: L. rufithorax

Binomial name
- Lebedodes rufithorax Hampson, 1910

Species of moth

Lebedodes rufithorax is a moth in the family Cossidae. It is found in South Africa.
