= Kroonia =

Scientific classification
- Kingdom: Animalia
- Phylum: Arthropoda
- Class: Insecta
- Order: Lepidoptera
- Family: Cossidae
- Subfamily: Metarbelinae
- Genus: Kroonia; Lehmann, 2010

Genus of moths

Kroonia is a genus of moths in the family Metarbelidae.

== Species ==
- Kroonia adamauensis Lehmann, 2010
- Kroonia carteri Lehmann, 2010
- Kroonia dallastai Lehmann, 2010
- Kroonia fumealis (Janse, 1925)
- Kroonia heikeae Lehmann, 2010
- Kroonia honeyi Lehmann, 2010
- Kroonia murphyi Lehmann, 2010
- Kroonia natalica (Hampson, 1910)
- Kroonia politzari Lehmann, 2010
