= Shimonia =

Scientific classification
- Domain: Eukaryota
- Kingdom: Animalia
- Phylum: Arthropoda
- Class: Insecta
- Order: Lepidoptera
- Family: Metarbelidae
- Genus: Shimonia; Lehmann & Rajaei, 2013

Species
- See text

Genus of moths

Shimonia is a genus of moths in the family Metarbelidae. The genus was described by Ingo Lehmann and Hossein Rajaei in 2013.

== Species ==
- Shimonia fischeri Lehmann & Rajaei, 2013
- Shimonia oyiekeae Lehmann & Rajaei, 2013
- Shimonia splendida (D. S. Fletcher, 1968)
- Shimonia timberlakei Lehmann & Rajaei, 2013

== Etymology ==
The genus is named for Shimoni Lehmann, the son of the senior author.
