= Lebedodes endomela =

Scientific classification
- Kingdom: Animalia
- Phylum: Arthropoda
- Clade: Pancrustacea
- Class: Insecta
- Order: Lepidoptera
- Family: Cossidae
- Genus: Lebedodes
- Species: L. endomela

Binomial name
- Lebedodes endomela (Bethune-Baker, 1909)

Synonyms
- Metarbela endomela Bethune-Baker, 1909

Species of moth

Lebedodes endomela is a moth in the family Cossidae that is found in Kenya.
