= Melisomimas =

Scientific classification
- Kingdom: Animalia
- Phylum: Arthropoda
- Class: Insecta
- Order: Lepidoptera
- Family: Cossidae
- Subfamily: Metarbelinae
- Genus: Melisomimas; Jordan, 1907
- Species: M. metallica

Binomial name
- Melisomimas metallica Hampson, 1914

Synonyms
- Melisomimas grandis Jordan, 1907 (nec Hampson, 1893)

Species of moth

Melisomimas metallica is a moth in the family Cossidae, and the only species in the genus Melisomimas. It is found in Nigeria and Sierra Leone.
