= Lebedodes schaeferi =

Scientific classification
- Kingdom: Animalia
- Phylum: Arthropoda
- Class: Insecta
- Order: Lepidoptera
- Family: Cossidae
- Genus: Lebedodes
- Species: L. schaeferi

Binomial name
- Lebedodes schaeferi Grünberg, 1911

Species of moth

Lebedodes schaeferi is a moth in the family Cossidae. It is found in Cameroon.
