= Kroonia fumealis =

Scientific classification
- Kingdom: Animalia
- Phylum: Arthropoda
- Class: Insecta
- Order: Lepidoptera
- Family: Cossidae
- Genus: Kroonia
- Species: K. fumealis

Binomial name
- Kroonia fumealis (Janse, 1925)

Synonyms
- Lebedodes fumealis Janse, 1925

Species of moth

Kroonia fumealis is a moth in the family Cossidae. It is found in Botswana and Zimbabwe.
