= Saalmulleria =

Scientific classification
- Domain: Eukaryota
- Kingdom: Animalia
- Phylum: Arthropoda
- Class: Insecta
- Order: Lepidoptera
- Family: Cossidae
- Genus: Saalmulleria; Mabille, 1891

Synonyms
- Saalmuelleria Vevers, 1979

Genus of moths

Saalmulleria is a genus of moths in the family Cossidae.

== Species ==
- Saalmulleria dubiefi Viette, 1974
- Saalmulleria stumpffi Saalmüller, 1884
