= Kroonia natalica =

Scientific classification
- Kingdom: Animalia
- Phylum: Arthropoda
- Class: Insecta
- Order: Lepidoptera
- Family: Cossidae
- Genus: Kroonia
- Species: K. natalica

Binomial name
- Kroonia natalica (Hampson, 1910)

Synonyms
- Lebedodes natalica Hampson, 1910

Species of moth

Kroonia natalica is a moth in the family Cossidae. It is found in Kenya, Malawi, South Africa, Tanzania and Zimbabwe.
