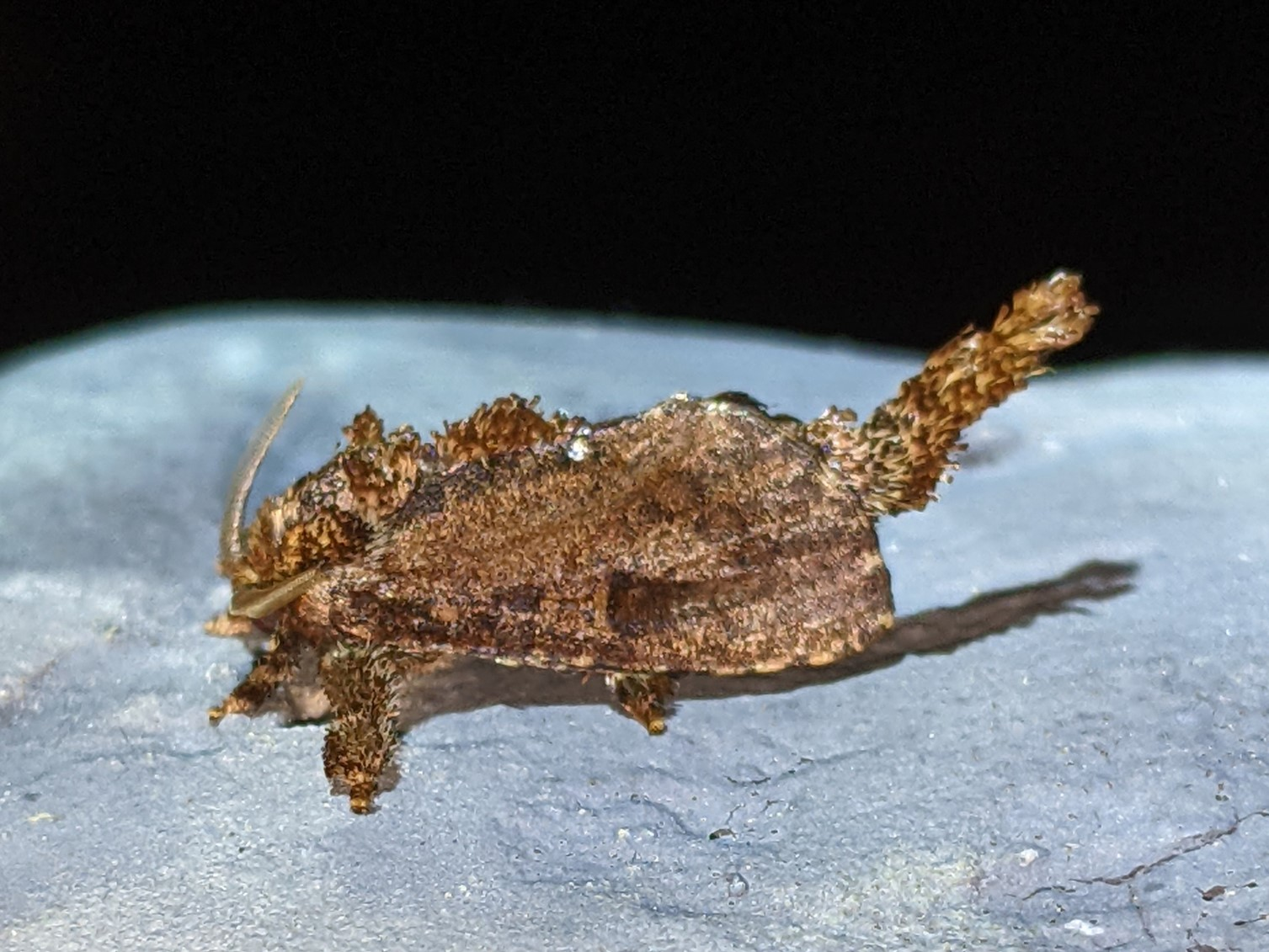
- Stueningeria bretschneideri

Scientific classification
- Kingdom: Animalia
- Phylum: Arthropoda
- Clade: Pancrustacea
- Class: Insecta
- Order: Lepidoptera
- Infraorder: Heteroneura
- Clade: Eulepidoptera
- Clade: Ditrysia
- Clade: Apoditrysia
- Superfamily: Cossoidea
- Family: Metarbelidae; Strand, 1909

Synonyms
- Arbelidae Hampson, [1893] (Unav.); Hollandiidae Karsch, 1896 (Unav.); Lepidarbelidae Dalla Torre & Strand, 1923; Teragridae Hampson, 1920

= Metarbelidae =

Family of moths

The Metarbelidae are a family of the Cossoidea also called the carpenter or goat moths, and is sometimes treated as a subfamily, Metarbelinae of the Cossidae. No synapomorphies are shared with the Cossidae based on adult morphology. The family Metarbelidae was first described by Embrik Strand in 1909.

== Genera ==
- Aethiopina Gaede, 1929
- Arbelodes Karsch, 1896
- Bjoernstadia Lehmann, 2012
- Dianfosseya Lehmann, 2014
- Eberhardfischeria Lehmann & Dalsgaard, 2023
- Encaumaptera Hampson, 1893
- Finsterwaldeia Lehmann, 2025
- Haberlandia Lehmann, 2011
- Indarbela T. B. Fletcher, 1922
- Janegoodallia Lehmann, 2014
- Kayamuhakaia Lehmann, 2025
- Kroonia Lehmann, 2010
- Lebedodes Holland, 1893
- Lichterfeldia Lehmann, 2025
- Lukeniana Lehmann, Zahiri & Husemann, 2023
- Lutzkobesia I. Lehmann, 2019
- Marshalliana Aurivillius, 1901
- Melisomimas Jordan, 1907
- Metarbela Holland, 1893
- Metarbelodes Strand, 1909
- Morondavania Lehmann & Dalsgaard, 2023
- Mountelgonia Lehmann, 2013
- Moyencharia Lehmann, 2013
- Ortharbela Aurivillius, 1910
- Paralebedella Strand, 1923
- Saalmulleria Mabille, 1891
- Salagena Walker, 1865
- Shimbania Lehmann & Dalsgaard, 2023
- Shimonia I. Lehmann & Rajaei, 2013
- Squamicapilla Schultze, 1908
- Squamura Heylaerts, 1890
- Stenagra Hampson, 1920
- Stueningeria I. Lehmann, 2019
- Subarchaeopacha Dufrane, 1945
- Tearbela Yakovlev & Zolotuhin, 2021
- Teragra Walker, 1855
- Zambezia Lehmann, Zahiri & Husemann, 2023

== Former genera ==
- Catarbelana Bethune-Baker, 1908
