= List of moths of Somaliland =

Location of the Republic of Somaliland

There are about 380 known moth species of Somaliland. The moths (mostly nocturnal) and butterflies (mostly diurnal) together make up the taxonomic order Lepidoptera.

This is a list of moth species which have been recorded in Somaliland.

== Arctiidae ==
- Alpenus diversata (Hampson, 1916)
- Alpenus investigatorum (Karsch, 1898)
- Alpenus nigropunctata (Bethune-Baker, 1908)
- Amata alicia (Butler, 1876)
- Amata chrysozona (Hampson, 1898)
- Amata romeii Berio, 1941
- Amata velatipennis (Walker, 1864)
- Amerila vitrea Plötz, 1880
- Amsacta melanogastra (Holland, 1897)
- Amsacta paolii Berio, 1936
- Amsactarctia radiosa (Pagenstecher, 1903)
- Amsactarctia venusta (Toulgoët, 1980)
- Apisa canescens Walker, 1855
- Argina amanda (Boisduval, 1847)
- Argina astrea (Drury, 1773)
- Automolis meteus (Stoll, 1781)
- Estigmene griseata Hampson, 1916
- Galtara somaliensis (Hampson, 1916)
- Micralarctia tolgoeti Watson, 1988
- Nanna eningae (Plötz, 1880)
- Ochrota unicolor (Hopffer, 1857)
- Paralacydes arborifera (Butler, 1875)
- Paralacydes fiorii (Berio, 1937)
- Paralacydes minorata (Berio, 1935)
- Secusio discoidalis Talbot, 1929
- Secusio strigata Walker, 1854
- Spilosoma mediopunctata (Pagenstecher, 1903)
- Spilosoma semihyalina Bartel, 1903
- Teracotona rhodophaea (Walker, 1865)
- Teracotona submacula (Walker, 1855)
- Trichaeta fulvescens (Walker, 1854)
- Trichaeta pterophorina (Mabille, 1892)
- Utetheisa amhara Jordan, 1939
- Utetheisa pulchella (Linnaeus, 1758)

== Bombycidae ==
- Ocinara ficicola (Westwood & Ormerod, 1889)

== Cossidae ==
- Aethalopteryx tristis (Gaede, 1915)
- Nomima prophanes Durrant, 1916

== Crambidae ==
- Bocchoris inspersalis (Zeller, 1852)
- Cnaphalocrocis trapezalis (Guenée, 1854)
- Crocidolomia pavonana (Fabricius, 1794)
- Herpetogramma mutualis (Zeller, 1852)
- Hodebertia testalis (Fabricius, 1794)
- Pyrausta phaenicealis (Hübner, 1818)

== Gelechiidae ==
- Pectinophora gossypiella (Saunders, 1844)

== Geometridae ==
- Acidaliastis subbrunnescens Prout, 1916
- Aetheometra iconoclasis Prout, 1931
- Antharmostes papilio Prout, 1912
- Chiasmia calvifrons (Prout, 1916)
- Chiasmia inconspicua (Warren, 1897)
- Chiasmia semialbida (Prout, 1915)
- Chiasmia subcurvaria (Mabille, 1897)
- Cyclophora imperialis (Berio, 1937)
- Hemidromodes subbrunnescens Prout, 1915
- Isturgia deerraria (Walker, 1861)
- Lomographa indularia (Guenée, 1858)
- Pachypalpella subalbata (Warren, 1900)
- Phaiogramma stibolepida (Butler, 1879)
- Prasinocyma perpulverata Prout, 1916
- Scopula africana Berio, 1937
- Scopula minoa (Prout, 1916)
- Scopula nepheloperas (Prout, 1916)
- Scopula sagittilinea (Warren, 1897)
- Sesquialtera ridicula Prout, 1916
- Traminda acuta (Warren, 1897)
- Traminda neptunaria (Guenée, 1858)
- Tricentroscelis protrusifrons Prout, 1916
- Zamarada mesotaenia Prout, 1931
- Zamarada secutaria (Guenée, 1858)
- Zamarada torrida D. S. Fletcher, 1974

== Gracillariidae ==
- Acrocercops bifasciata (Walsingham, 1891)

== Lasiocampidae ==
- Anadiasa colenettei Hartig, 1940
- Anadiasa nicotrai Hartig, 1940
- Anadiasa simplex Pagenstecher, 1903
- Beralade fulvostriata Pagenstecher, 1903
- Beralade sobrina (Druce, 1900)
- Bombycopsis hyatti Tams, 1931
- Chionopsyche grisea Aurivillius, 1914
- Gonometa negrottoi Berio, 1940
- Odontocheilopteryx myxa Wallengren, 1860
- Odontocheilopteryx politzari Gurkovich & Zolotuhin, 2009
- Odontopacha fenestrata Aurivillius, 1909
- Sena donaldsoni (Holland, 1901)
- Sena prompta (Walker, 1855)
- Stenophatna marshalli Aurivillius, 1909
- Stoermeriana abyssinicum (Aurivillius, 1908)
- Stoermeriana collenettei Tams, 1931
- Streblote finitorum Tams, 1931

== Limacodidae ==
- Coenobasis chloronoton Hampson, 1916
- Coenobasis postflavida Hampson, 1910
- Gavara caprai Berio, 1937
- Gavara leucomera Hampson, 1916
- Gavara velutina Walker, 1857
- Latoia vivida (Walker, 1865)
- Scotinochroa minor Hampson, 1916

== Lymantriidae ==
- Aclonophlebia inconspicua Hampson, 1910
- Casama impura (Hering, 1926)
- Casama vilis (Walker, 1865)
- Cropera confalonierii Berio, 1937
- Croperoides negrottoi Berio, 1940
- Dasychira daphne Hering, 1926
- Knappetra fasciata (Walker, 1855)
- Laelia subrosea (Walker, 1855)
- Rhypopteryx rhodea (Hampson, 1905

== Metarbelidae ==
- Metarbela erecta Gaede, 1929

== Noctuidae ==
- Acantholipes circumdata (Walker, 1858)
- Achaea catella Guenée, 1852
- Achaea lienardi (Boisduval, 1833)
- Achaea mercatoria (Fabricius, 1775)
- Acontia apatelia (Swinhoe, 1907)
- Acontia basifera Walker, 1857
- Acontia berioi Hacker, Legrain & Fibiger, 2008
- Acontia caeruleopicta Hampson, 1916
- Acontia caffraria (Cramer, 1777)
- Acontia chiaromontei Berio, 1936
- Acontia discoidea Hopffer, 1857
- Acontia ectorrida (Hampson, 1916)
- Acontia hortensis Swinhoe, 1884
- Acontia imitatrix Wallengren, 1856
- Acontia insocia (Walker, 1857)
- Acontia lanzai (Berio, 1985)
- Acontia mascheriniae (Berio, 1985)
- Acontia miogona (Hampson, 1916)
- Acontia notha Hacker, Legrain & Fibiger, 2010
- Acontia nubila Hampson, 1910
- Acontia opalinoides Guenée, 1852
- Acontia pergratiosa Berio, 1937
- Acontia porphyrea (Butler, 1898)
- Acontia rigatoi Hacker, Legrain & Fibiger, 2008
- Acontia semialba Hampson, 1910
- Acontia somaliensis (Berio, 1977)
- Acontia sublactea Hacker, Legrain & Fibiger, 2008
- Acontia transfigurata Wallengren, 1856
- Acontia trimaculata Aurivillius, 1879
- Adisura bella Gaede, 1915
- Aegleoides paolii Berio, 1937
- Aegocera brevivitta Hampson, 1901
- Aegocera rectilinea Boisduval, 1836
- Agrotis bialbifasciata Berio, 1953
- Agrotis negrottoi Berio, 1938
- Agrotis nicotrai Berio, 1945
- Agrotis pictifascia (Hampson, 1896)
- Amazonides menieri Laporte, 1974
- Amyna axis Guenée, 1852
- Amyna punctum (Fabricius, 1794)
- Androlymnia clavata Hampson, 1910
- Anoba trigonosema (Hampson, 1916)
- Anomis erosa (Hübner, 1818)
- Anomis flava (Fabricius, 1775)
- Anomis involuta Walker, 1857
- Anomis mesogona (Walker, 1857)
- Anomis sabulifera (Guenée, 1852)
- Antarchaea digramma (Walker, 1863)
- Antarchaea fragilis (Butler, 1875)
- Anticarsia rubricans (Boisduval, 1833)
- Ariathisa abyssinia (Guenée, 1852)
- Asplenia melanodonta (Hampson, 1896)
- Athetis discopuncta Hampson, 1916
- Athetis satellitia (Hampson, 1902)
- Audea melanoplaga Hampson, 1902
- Beihania diascota (Hampson, 1916)
- Brevipecten calimanii (Berio, 1939)
- Brevipecten cornuta Hampson, 1902
- Brevipecten discolora Hacker & Fibiger, 2007
- Brevipecten marmoreata Hacker & Fibiger, 2007
- Brevipecten tessenei Berio, 1939
- Calesia zambesita Walker, 1865
- Callhyccoda viriditrina Berio, 1935
- Callopistria latreillei (Duponchel, 1827)
- Callopistria yerburii Butler, 1884
- Caranilla uvarovi (Wiltshire, 1949)
- Catephia mesonephele Hampson, 1916
- Cerocala albimacula Hampson, 1916
- Cerocala grandirena Berio, 1954
- Cerocala illustrata Holland, 1897
- Cerocala munda Druce, 1900
- Cerocala oppia (Druce, 1900)
- Cetola vicina de Joannis, 1913
- Chrysodeixis acuta (Walker, [1858])
- Chrysodeixis chalcites (Esper, 1789)
- Chrysodeixis eriosoma (Doubleday, 1843)
- Clytie tropicalis Rungs, 1975
- Condica capensis (Guenée, 1852)
- Craterestra definiens (Walker, 1857)
- Crionica cervicornis (Fawcett, 1917)
- Ctenoplusia fracta (Walker, 1857)
- Ctenusa curvilinea Hampson, 1913
- Cyligramma fluctuosa (Drury, 1773)
- Diparopsis castanea Hampson, 1902
- Discestra quercii Berio, 1941
- Donuctenusa fiorii Berio, 1940
- Dysgonia algira (Linnaeus, 1767)
- Dysgonia torrida (Guenée, 1852)
- Ecthymia lemonia Berio, 1940
- Epharmottomena sublimbata Berio, 1894
- Erebus macrops (Linnaeus, 1767)
- Ethiopica hesperonota Hampson, 1909
- Ethiopica ignecolora Hampson, 1916
- Ethiopica phaeocausta Hampson, 1916
- Eublemma daphoenoides Berio, 1941
- Eublemma exigua (Walker, 1858)
- Eublemma galacteoides Berio, 1937
- Eublemma olmii Berio, 1937
- Eublemma postrosea Gaede, 1935
- Eublemma reninigra Berio, 1945
- Eublemma rivula (Moore, 1882)
- Eublemma scitula (Rambur, 1833)
- Eudocima materna (Linnaeus, 1767)
- Eulocastra tamsi Berio, 1938
- Eustrotia decissima (Walker, 1865)
- Eustrotia extranea Berio, 1937
- Eutelia discitriga Walker, 1865
- Eutelia grisescens Hampson, 1916
- Giubicolanta orientalis Berio, 1937
- Grammodes exclusiva Pagenstecher, 1907
- Grammodes stolida (Fabricius, 1775)
- Hadjina plumbeogrisea (Hampson, 1916)
- Helicoverpa zea (Boddie, 1850)
- Heliothis nubigera Herrich-Schäffer, 1851
- Hemituerta mahdi (Pagenstecher, 1903)
- Heraclia thruppi (Butler, 1886)
- Heteropalpia robusta Wiltshire, 1988
- Heteropalpia vetusta (Walker, 1865)
- Hypena abyssinialis Guenée, 1854
- Hypena lividalis (Hübner, 1790)
- Hypena obacerralis Walker, [1859]
- Hypena obsitalis (Hübner, [1813])
- Hypotacha bubo Berio, 1941
- Hypotacha indecisa Walker, [1858]
- Hypotacha retracta (Hampson, 1902)
- Janseodes melanospila (Guenée, 1852)
- Leucania inangulata (Gaede, 1935)
- Leucania loreyi (Duponchel, 1827)
- Leucania melanostrota (Hampson, 1905)
- Leucania negrottoi (Berio, 1940)
- Leucania patrizii (Berio, 1935)
- Lophotavia incivilis Walker, 1865
- Lyncestoides unilinea (Swinhoe, 1885)
- Masalia fissifascia (Hampson, 1903)
- Masalia leucosticta (Hampson, 1902)
- Masalia perstriata (Hampson, 1903)
- Matopo descarpentriesi (Laporte, 1975)
- Mentaxya muscosa Geyer, 1837
- Microraphe fiorii Berio, 1937
- Mimasura innotata Hampson, 1910
- Mimasura pseudopyralis Berio, 1937
- Mimasura unipuncta (Hampson, 1902)
- Mitrophrys menete (Cramer, 1775)
- Odontoretha featheri Hampson, 1916
- Oedicodia melanographa Hampson, 1916
- Oedicodia strigipennis Hampson, 1916
- Ophiusa tirhaca (Cramer, 1777)
- Oraesia intrusa (Krüger, 1939)
- Oraesia provocans Walker, [1858]
- Ozarba albimarginata (Hampson, 1896)
- Ozarba albomediovittata Berio, 1937
- Ozarba aloisiisabaudiae Berio, 1937
- Ozarba boursini Berio, 1940
- Ozarba deficiens Berio, 1935
- Ozarba endoplaga Hampson, 1916
- Ozarba endoscota Hampson, 1916
- Ozarba negrottoi Berio, 1940
- Ozarba nicotrai Berio, 1950
- Ozarba parvula Berio, 1940
- Ozarba pluristriata (Berio, 1937)
- Ozarba scorpio Berio, 1935
- Ozarba semiluctuosa Berio, 1937
- Ozarba semitorrida Hampson, 1916
- Pericyma mendax (Walker, 1858)
- Pericyma metaleuca Hampson, 1913
- Pericyma umbrina (Guenée, 1852)
- Phytometra pentheus Fawcett, 1916
- Plecoptera reflexa Guenée, 1852
- Plecopterodes clytie Gaede, 1936
- Polydesma scriptilis Guenée, 1852
- Pseudozarba bipartita (Herrich-Schäffer, 1950)
- Pseudozarba mianoides (Hampson, 1893)
- Pseudozarba opella (Swinhoe, 1885)
- Rabila albiviridis (Hampson, 1916)
- Radara subcupralis (Walker, [1866])
- Rhesala moestalis (Walker, 1866)
- Rhynchina albiscripta Hampson, 1916
- Sesamia cretica Lederer, 1857
- Speia vuteria (Stoll, 1790)
- Sphingomorpha chlorea (Cramer, 1777)
- Spodoptera cilium Guenée, 1852
- Spodoptera exempta (Walker, 1857)
- Spodoptera exigua (Hübner, 1808)
- Spodoptera littoralis (Boisduval, 1833)
- Spodoptera mauritia (Boisduval, 1833)
- Teucocranon microcallia Berio, 1937
- Thermesia incedens (Walker, 1858)
- Thiacidas acronictoides (Berio, 1950)
- Thiacidas cerurodes (Hampson, 1916)
- Thiacidas fasciata (Fawcett, 1917)
- Thiacidas roseotincta (Pinhey, 1962)
- Thiacidas somaliensis Hacker & Zilli, 2010
- Thiacidas triangulata (Gaede, 1939)
- Trichoplusia ni (Hübner, [1803])
- Trichoplusia orichalcea (Fabricius, 1775)
- Trigonodes exportata Guenée, 1852
- Trigonodes hyppasia (Cramer, 1779)
- Tuerta pastocyana Berio, 1940
- Tytroca leucoptera (Hampson, 1896)
- Ulotrichopus primulina (Hampson, 1902)
- Ulotrichopus tinctipennis (Hampson, 1902)
- Xanthomera leucoglene (Mabille, 1880)
- Zethesides bettoni (Butler, 1898)

== Nolidae ==
- Arcyophora longivalvis Guenée, 1852
- Bryophilopsis tarachoides Mabille, 1900
- Earias insulana (Boisduval, 1833)
- Leocyma candace Fawcett, 1916
- Leocyma discophora Hampson, 1912
- Maurilia arcuata (Walker, [1858])
- Nola doggeensis Strand, 1920

== Notodontidae ==
- Antheua grisea (Gaede, 1928)
- Phalera imitata Druce, 1896
- Scrancia discomma Jordan, 1916
- Simesia balachowskyi Kiriakoff, 1973
- Simesia olmii (Berio, 1937)

== Plutellidae ==
- Paraxenistis africana Mey, 2007

== Psychidae ==
- Melasina psephota Durrant, 1916
- Melasina recondita Durrant, 1916

== Pterophoridae ==
- Agdistis arabica Amsel, 1958
- Arcoptilia gizan Arenberger, 1985
- Deuterocopus socotranus Rebel, 1907
- Megalorhipida leucodactylus (Fabricius, 1794)

== Saturniidae ==
- Bunaeopsis oubie (Guérin-Méneville, 1849)
- Gynanisa maja (Klug, 1836)
- Ludia arguta Jordan, 1922
- Ludia hansali Felder, 1874
- Ludia jordani Bouyer, 1997
- Melanocera menippe (Westwood, 1849)
- Orthogonioptilum ianthinum Rougeot, 1959
- Yatanga smithi (Holland, 1892)

== Sesiidae ==
- Echidgnathia vitrifasciata (Hampson, 1910)
- Melittia pyropis Hampson, 1919
- Melittia ursipes Walker, 1856

== Sphingidae ==
- Acherontia atropos (Linnaeus, 1758)
- Agrius convolvuli (Linnaeus, 1758)
- Cephonodes hylas (Linnaeus, 1771)
- Ellenbeckia monospila Rothschild & Jordan, 1903
- Hippotion celerio (Linnaeus, 1758)
- Hippotion moorei Jordan, 1926
- Hippotion pentagramma (Hampson, 1910)
- Hippotion rebeli Rothschild & Jordan, 1903
- Hippotion rosae (Butler, 1882)
- Hippotion socotrensis (Rebel, 1899)
- Hippotion stigma (Rothschild & Jordan, 1903)
- Leucostrophus alterhirundo d'Abrera, 1987
- Likoma crenata Rothschild & Jordan, 1907
- Microclanis erlangeri (Rothschild & Jordan, 1903)
- Nephele argentifera (Walker, 1856)
- Nephele funebris (Fabricius, 1793)
- Nephele xylina Rothschild & Jordan, 1910
- Poliana micra Rothschild & Jordan, 1903
- Poliodes roseicornis Rothschild & Jordan, 1903
- Polyptychoides grayii (Walker, 1856)
- Polyptychoides niloticus (Jordan, 1921)
- Praedora marshalli Rothschild & Jordan, 1903
- Pseudoclanis postica (Walker, 1856)
- Rufoclanis erlangeri (Rothschild & Jordan, 1903)

== Thyrididae ==
- Kuja hamatypex (Hampson, 1916)

== Tineidae ==
- Phthoropoea halogramma (Meyrick, 1927)
- Trichophaga abruptella (Wollaston, 1858)

== Tortricidae ==
- Ancylis spinicola Meyrick, 1927
- Eucosma somalica Durrant, 1916

== Xyloryctidae ==
- Eretmocera fasciata Walsingham, 1896

== Zygaenidae ==
- Epiorna abessynica (Koch, 1865)
- Saliunca homochroa (Holland, 1897)
