= List of moths of Somalia =

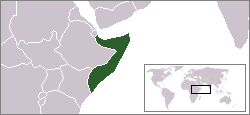
Location of Somalia

There are about 380 known moth species of Somalia. The moths (mostly nocturnal) and butterflies (mostly diurnal) together make up the taxonomic order Lepidoptera.

This is a list of moth species which have been recorded in Somalia.

== Arctiidae ==
- Alpenus diversata (Hampson, 1916)
- Alpenus investigatorum (Karsch, 1898)
- Alpenus nigropunctata (Bethune-Baker, 1908)
- Amata alicia (Butler, 1876)
- Amata chrysozona (Hampson, 1898)
- Amata romeii Berio, 1941
- Amata velatipennis (Walker, 1864)
- Amerila vitrea Plötz, 1880
- Amsacta melanogastra (Holland, 1897)
- Amsacta paolii Berio, 1936
- Amsactarctia radiosa (Pagenstecher, 1903)
- Amsactarctia venusta (Toulgoët, 1980)
- Apisa canescens Walker, 1855
- Argina amanda (Boisduval, 1847)
- Argina astrea (Drury, 1773)
- Automolis meteus (Stoll, 1781)
- Estigmene griseata Hampson, 1916
- Galtara somaliensis (Hampson, 1916)
- Micralarctia tolgoeti Watson, 1988
- Nanna eningae (Plötz, 1880)
- Ochrota unicolor (Hopffer, 1857)
- Paralacydes arborifera (Butler, 1875)
- Paralacydes fiorii (Berio, 1937)
- Paralacydes minorata (Berio, 1935)
- Secusio discoidalis Talbot, 1929
- Secusio strigata Walker, 1854
- Spilosoma mediopunctata (Pagenstecher, 1903)
- Spilosoma semihyalina Bartel, 1903
- Teracotona rhodophaea (Walker, 1865)
- Teracotona submacula (Walker, 1855)
- Trichaeta fulvescens (Walker, 1854)
- Trichaeta pterophorina (Mabille, 1892)
- Utetheisa amhara Jordan, 1939
- Utetheisa pulchella (Linnaeus, 1758)

== Bombycidae ==
- Ocinara ficicola (Westwood & Ormerod, 1889)

== Cossidae ==
- Aethalopteryx tristis (Gaede, 1915)
- Nomima prophanes Durrant, 1916

== Crambidae ==
- Bocchoris inspersalis (Zeller, 1852)
- Cnaphalocrocis trapezalis (Guenée, 1854)
- Crocidolomia pavonana (Fabricius, 1794)
- Herpetogramma mutualis (Zeller, 1852)
- Hodebertia testalis (Fabricius, 1794)
- Pyrausta phaenicealis (Hübner, 1818)

== Gelechiidae ==
- Pectinophora gossypiella (Saunders, 1844)

== Geometridae ==
- Acidaliastis subbrunnescens Prout, 1916
- Aetheometra iconoclasis Prout, 1931
- Antharmostes papilio Prout, 1912
- Chiasmia calvifrons (Prout, 1916)
- Chiasmia inconspicua (Warren, 1897)
- Chiasmia semialbida (Prout, 1915)
- Chiasmia subcurvaria (Mabille, 1897)
- Cyclophora imperialis (Berio, 1937)
- Hemidromodes subbrunnescens Prout, 1915
- Isturgia deerraria (Walker, 1861)
- Lomographa indularia (Guenée, 1858)
- Pachypalpella subalbata (Warren, 1900)
- Phaiogramma stibolepida (Butler, 1879)
- Prasinocyma perpulverata Prout, 1916
- Scopula africana Berio, 1937
- Scopula minoa (Prout, 1916)
- Scopula nepheloperas (Prout, 1916)
- Scopula sagittilinea (Warren, 1897)
- Sesquialtera ridicula Prout, 1916
- Traminda acuta (Warren, 1897)
- Traminda neptunaria (Guenée, 1858)
- Tricentroscelis protrusifrons Prout, 1916
- Zamarada mesotaenia Prout, 1931
- Zamarada secutaria (Guenée, 1858)
- Zamarada torrida D. S. Fletcher, 1974

== Gracillariidae ==
- Acrocercops bifasciata (Walsingham, 1891)

== Lasiocampidae ==
- Anadiasa colenettei Hartig, 1940
- Anadiasa nicotrai Hartig, 1940
- Anadiasa simplex Pagenstecher, 1903
- Beralade fulvostriata Pagenstecher, 1903
- Beralade sobrina (Druce, 1900)
- Bombycopsis hyatti Tams, 1931
- Chionopsyche grisea Aurivillius, 1914
- Gonometa negrottoi Berio, 1940
- Odontocheilopteryx myxa Wallengren, 1860
- Odontocheilopteryx politzari Gurkovich & Zolotuhin, 2009
- Odontopacha fenestrata Aurivillius, 1909
- Sena donaldsoni (Holland, 1901)
- Sena prompta (Walker, 1855)
- Stenophatna marshalli Aurivillius, 1909
- Stoermeriana abyssinicum (Aurivillius, 1908)
- Stoermeriana collenettei Tams, 1931
- Streblote finitorum Tams, 1931

== Limacodidae ==
- Coenobasis chloronoton Hampson, 1916
- Coenobasis postflavida Hampson, 1910
- Gavara caprai Berio, 1937
- Gavara leucomera Hampson, 1916
- Gavara velutina Walker, 1857
- Latoia vivida (Walker, 1865)
- Scotinochroa minor Hampson, 1916

== Lymantriidae ==
- Aclonophlebia inconspicua Hampson, 1910
- Casama impura (Hering, 1926)
- Casama vilis (Walker, 1865)
- Cropera confalonierii Berio, 1937
- Croperoides negrottoi Berio, 1940
- Dasychira daphne Hering, 1926
- Knappetra fasciata (Walker, 1855)
- Laelia subrosea (Walker, 1855)
- Rhypopteryx rhodea (Hampson, 1905

== Metarbelidae ==
- Metarbela erecta Gaede, 1929

== Noctuidae ==
- Acantholipes circumdata (Walker, 1858)
- Achaea catella Guenée, 1852
- Achaea lienardi (Boisduval, 1833)
- Achaea mercatoria (Fabricius, 1775)
- Acontia apatelia (Swinhoe, 1907)
- Acontia basifera Walker, 1857
- Acontia berioi Hacker, Legrain & Fibiger, 2008
- Acontia caeruleopicta Hampson, 1916
- Acontia caffraria (Cramer, 1777)
- Acontia chiaromontei Berio, 1936
- Acontia discoidea Hopffer, 1857
- Acontia ectorrida (Hampson, 1916)
- Acontia hortensis Swinhoe, 1884
- Acontia imitatrix Wallengren, 1856
- Acontia insocia (Walker, 1857)
- Acontia lanzai (Berio, 1985)
- Acontia mascheriniae (Berio, 1985)
- Acontia miogona (Hampson, 1916)
- Acontia notha Hacker, Legrain & Fibiger, 2010
- Acontia nubila Hampson, 1910
- Acontia opalinoides Guenée, 1852
- Acontia pergratiosa Berio, 1937
- Acontia porphyrea (Butler, 1898)
- Acontia rigatoi Hacker, Legrain & Fibiger, 2008
- Acontia semialba Hampson, 1910
- Acontia somaliensis (Berio, 1977)
- Acontia sublactea Hacker, Legrain & Fibiger, 2008
- Acontia transfigurata Wallengren, 1856
- Acontia trimaculata Aurivillius, 1879
- Adisura bella Gaede, 1915
- Aegleoides paolii Berio, 1937
- Aegocera brevivitta Hampson, 1901
- Aegocera rectilinea Boisduval, 1836
- Agrotis bialbifasciata Berio, 1953
- Agrotis negrottoi Berio, 1938
- Agrotis nicotrai Berio, 1945
- Agrotis pictifascia (Hampson, 1896)
- Amazonides menieri Laporte, 1974
- Amyna axis Guenée, 1852
- Amyna punctum (Fabricius, 1794)
- Androlymnia clavata Hampson, 1910
- Anoba trigonosema (Hampson, 1916)
- Anomis erosa (Hübner, 1818)
- Anomis flava (Fabricius, 1775)
- Anomis involuta Walker, 1857
- Anomis mesogona (Walker, 1857)
- Anomis sabulifera (Guenée, 1852)
- Antarchaea digramma (Walker, 1863)
- Antarchaea fragilis (Butler, 1875)
- Anticarsia rubricans (Boisduval, 1833)
- Ariathisa abyssinia (Guenée, 1852)
- Asplenia melanodonta (Hampson, 1896)
- Athetis discopuncta Hampson, 1916
- Athetis satellitia (Hampson, 1902)
- Audea melanoplaga Hampson, 1902
- Beihania diascota (Hampson, 1916)
- Brevipecten calimanii (Berio, 1939)
- Brevipecten cornuta Hampson, 1902
- Brevipecten discolora Hacker & Fibiger, 2007
- Brevipecten marmoreata Hacker & Fibiger, 2007
- Brevipecten tessenei Berio, 1939
- Calesia zambesita Walker, 1865
- Callhyccoda viriditrina Berio, 1935
- Callopistria latreillei (Duponchel, 1827)
- Callopistria yerburii Butler, 1884
- Caranilla uvarovi (Wiltshire, 1949)
- Catephia mesonephele Hampson, 1916
- Cerocala albimacula Hampson, 1916
- Cerocala grandirena Berio, 1954
- Cerocala illustrata Holland, 1897
- Cerocala munda Druce, 1900
- Cerocala oppia (Druce, 1900)
- Cetola vicina de Joannis, 1913
- Chrysodeixis acuta (Walker, [1858])
- Chrysodeixis chalcites (Esper, 1789)
- Chrysodeixis eriosoma (Doubleday, 1843)
- Clytie tropicalis Rungs, 1975
- Condica capensis (Guenée, 1852)
- Craterestra definiens (Walker, 1857)
- Crionica cervicornis (Fawcett, 1917)
- Ctenoplusia fracta (Walker, 1857)
- Ctenusa curvilinea Hampson, 1913
- Cyligramma fluctuosa (Drury, 1773)
- Diparopsis castanea Hampson, 1902
- Discestra quercii Berio, 1941
- Donuctenusa fiorii Berio, 1940
- Dysgonia algira (Linnaeus, 1767)
- Dysgonia torrida (Guenée, 1852)
- Ecthymia lemonia Berio, 1940
- Epharmottomena sublimbata Berio, 1894
- Erebus macrops (Linnaeus, 1767)
- Ethiopica hesperonota Hampson, 1909
- Ethiopica ignecolora Hampson, 1916
- Ethiopica phaeocausta Hampson, 1916
- Eublemma daphoenoides Berio, 1941
- Eublemma exigua (Walker, 1858)
- Eublemma galacteoides Berio, 1937
- Eublemma olmii Berio, 1937
- Eublemma postrosea Gaede, 1935
- Eublemma reninigra Berio, 1945
- Eublemma rivula (Moore, 1882)
- Eublemma scitula (Rambur, 1833)
- Eudocima materna (Linnaeus, 1767)
- Eulocastra tamsi Berio, 1938
- Eustrotia decissima (Walker, 1865)
- Eustrotia extranea Berio, 1937
- Eutelia discitriga Walker, 1865
- Eutelia grisescens Hampson, 1916
- Giubicolanta orientalis Berio, 1937
- Grammodes exclusiva Pagenstecher, 1907
- Grammodes stolida (Fabricius, 1775)
- Hadjina plumbeogrisea (Hampson, 1916)
- Helicoverpa zea (Boddie, 1850)
- Heliothis nubigera Herrich-Schäffer, 1851
- Hemituerta mahdi (Pagenstecher, 1903)
- Heraclia thruppi (Butler, 1886)
- Heteropalpia robusta Wiltshire, 1988
- Heteropalpia vetusta (Walker, 1865)
- Hypena abyssinialis Guenée, 1854
- Hypena lividalis (Hübner, 1790)
- Hypena obacerralis Walker, [1859]
- Hypena obsitalis (Hübner, [1813])
- Hypotacha bubo Berio, 1941
- Hypotacha indecisa Walker, [1858]
- Hypotacha retracta (Hampson, 1902)
- Janseodes melanospila (Guenée, 1852)
- Leucania inangulata (Gaede, 1935)
- Leucania loreyi (Duponchel, 1827)
- Leucania melanostrota (Hampson, 1905)
- Leucania negrottoi (Berio, 1940)
- Leucania patrizii (Berio, 1935)
- Lophotavia incivilis Walker, 1865
- Lyncestoides unilinea (Swinhoe, 1885)
- Masalia fissifascia (Hampson, 1903)
- Masalia leucosticta (Hampson, 1902)
- Masalia perstriata (Hampson, 1903)
- Matopo descarpentriesi (Laporte, 1975)
- Mentaxya muscosa Geyer, 1837
- Microraphe fiorii Berio, 1937
- Mimasura innotata Hampson, 1910
- Mimasura pseudopyralis Berio, 1937
- Mimasura unipuncta (Hampson, 1902)
- Mitrophrys menete (Cramer, 1775)
- Odontoretha featheri Hampson, 1916
- Oedicodia melanographa Hampson, 1916
- Oedicodia strigipennis Hampson, 1916
- Ophiusa tirhaca (Cramer, 1777)
- Oraesia intrusa (Krüger, 1939)
- Oraesia provocans Walker, [1858]
- Ozarba albimarginata (Hampson, 1896)
- Ozarba albomediovittata Berio, 1937
- Ozarba aloisiisabaudiae Berio, 1937
- Ozarba boursini Berio, 1940
- Ozarba deficiens Berio, 1935
- Ozarba endoplaga Hampson, 1916
- Ozarba endoscota Hampson, 1916
- Ozarba negrottoi Berio, 1940
- Ozarba nicotrai Berio, 1950
- Ozarba parvula Berio, 1940
- Ozarba pluristriata (Berio, 1937)
- Ozarba scorpio Berio, 1935
- Ozarba semiluctuosa Berio, 1937
- Ozarba semitorrida Hampson, 1916
- Pericyma mendax (Walker, 1858)
- Pericyma metaleuca Hampson, 1913
- Pericyma umbrina (Guenée, 1852)
- Phytometra pentheus Fawcett, 1916
- Plecoptera reflexa Guenée, 1852
- Plecopterodes clytie Gaede, 1936
- Polydesma scriptilis Guenée, 1852
- Pseudozarba bipartita (Herrich-Schäffer, 1950)
- Pseudozarba mianoides (Hampson, 1893)
- Pseudozarba opella (Swinhoe, 1885)
- Rabila albiviridis (Hampson, 1916)
- Radara subcupralis (Walker, [1866])
- Rhesala moestalis (Walker, 1866)
- Rhynchina albiscripta Hampson, 1916
- Sesamia cretica Lederer, 1857
- Speia vuteria (Stoll, 1790)
- Sphingomorpha chlorea (Cramer, 1777)
- Spodoptera cilium Guenée, 1852
- Spodoptera exempta (Walker, 1857)
- Spodoptera exigua (Hübner, 1808)
- Spodoptera littoralis (Boisduval, 1833)
- Spodoptera mauritia (Boisduval, 1833)
- Teucocranon microcallia Berio, 1937
- Thermesia incedens (Walker, 1858)
- Thiacidas acronictoides (Berio, 1950)
- Thiacidas cerurodes (Hampson, 1916)
- Thiacidas fasciata (Fawcett, 1917)
- Thiacidas roseotincta (Pinhey, 1962)
- Thiacidas somaliensis Hacker & Zilli, 2010
- Thiacidas triangulata (Gaede, 1939)
- Trichoplusia ni (Hübner, [1803])
- Trichoplusia orichalcea (Fabricius, 1775)
- Trigonodes exportata Guenée, 1852
- Trigonodes hyppasia (Cramer, 1779)
- Tuerta pastocyana Berio, 1940
- Tytroca leucoptera (Hampson, 1896)
- Ulotrichopus primulina (Hampson, 1902)
- Ulotrichopus tinctipennis (Hampson, 1902)
- Xanthomera leucoglene (Mabille, 1880)
- Zethesides bettoni (Butler, 1898)

== Nolidae ==
- Arcyophora longivalvis Guenée, 1852
- Bryophilopsis tarachoides Mabille, 1900
- Earias insulana (Boisduval, 1833)
- Leocyma candace Fawcett, 1916
- Leocyma discophora Hampson, 1912
- Maurilia arcuata (Walker, [1858])
- Nola doggeensis Strand, 1920

== Notodontidae ==
- Antheua grisea (Gaede, 1928)
- Phalera imitata Druce, 1896
- Scrancia discomma Jordan, 1916
- Simesia balachowskyi Kiriakoff, 1973
- Simesia olmii (Berio, 1937)

== Plutellidae ==
- Paraxenistis africana Mey, 2007

== Psychidae ==
- Melasina psephota Durrant, 1916
- Melasina recondita Durrant, 1916

== Pterophoridae ==
- Agdistis arabica Amsel, 1958
- Arcoptilia gizan Arenberger, 1985
- Deuterocopus socotranus Rebel, 1907
- Megalorhipida leucodactylus (Fabricius, 1794)

== Saturniidae ==
- Bunaeopsis oubie (Guérin-Méneville, 1849)
- Gynanisa maja (Klug, 1836)
- Ludia arguta Jordan, 1922
- Ludia hansali Felder, 1874
- Ludia jordani Bouyer, 1997
- Melanocera menippe (Westwood, 1849)
- Orthogonioptilum ianthinum Rougeot, 1959
- Yatanga smithi (Holland, 1892)

== Sesiidae ==
- Echidgnathia vitrifasciata (Hampson, 1910)
- Melittia pyropis Hampson, 1919
- Melittia ursipes Walker, 1856

== Sphingidae ==
- Acherontia atropos (Linnaeus, 1758)
- Agrius convolvuli (Linnaeus, 1758)
- Cephonodes hylas (Linnaeus, 1771)
- Ellenbeckia monospila Rothschild & Jordan, 1903
- Hippotion celerio (Linnaeus, 1758)
- Hippotion moorei Jordan, 1926
- Hippotion pentagramma (Hampson, 1910)
- Hippotion rebeli Rothschild & Jordan, 1903
- Hippotion rosae (Butler, 1882)
- Hippotion socotrensis (Rebel, 1899)
- Hippotion stigma (Rothschild & Jordan, 1903)
- Leucostrophus alterhirundo d'Abrera, 1987
- Likoma crenata Rothschild & Jordan, 1907
- Microclanis erlangeri (Rothschild & Jordan, 1903)
- Nephele argentifera (Walker, 1856)
- Nephele funebris (Fabricius, 1793)
- Nephele xylina Rothschild & Jordan, 1910
- Poliana micra Rothschild & Jordan, 1903
- Poliodes roseicornis Rothschild & Jordan, 1903
- Polyptychoides grayii (Walker, 1856)
- Polyptychoides niloticus (Jordan, 1921)
- Praedora marshalli Rothschild & Jordan, 1903
- Pseudoclanis postica (Walker, 1856)
- Rufoclanis erlangeri (Rothschild & Jordan, 1903)

== Thyrididae ==
- Kuja hamatypex (Hampson, 1916)

== Tineidae ==
- Phthoropoea halogramma (Meyrick, 1927)
- Trichophaga abruptella (Wollaston, 1858)

== Tortricidae ==
- Ancylis spinicola Meyrick, 1927
- Eucosma somalica Durrant, 1916

== Xyloryctidae ==
- Eretmocera fasciata Walsingham, 1896

== Zygaenidae ==
- Epiorna abessynica (Koch, 1865)
- Saliunca homochroa (Holland, 1897)
