= Amsactarctia =

Scientific classification
- Domain: Eukaryota
- Kingdom: Animalia
- Phylum: Arthropoda
- Class: Insecta
- Order: Lepidoptera
- Superfamily: Noctuoidea
- Family: Erebidae
- Subfamily: Arctiinae
- Subtribe: Spilosomina
- Genus: Amsactarctia; Berio, 1938

Type species
- Amsacta radiosa Pagenstecher, 1903

Genus of moths

Amsactarctia is a genus of tiger moths in the family Erebidae erected by Emilio Berio in 1938.

== Species ==
- Amsactarctia pulchra (Rothschild, 1933)
- Amsactarctia radiosa (Pagenstecher, 1903)
- Amsactarctia venusta (Toulgoët, 1980)
