= Teucocranon =

Scientific classification
- Domain: Eukaryota
- Kingdom: Animalia
- Phylum: Arthropoda
- Class: Insecta
- Order: Lepidoptera
- Superfamily: Noctuoidea
- Family: Noctuidae
- Subfamily: Acontiinae
- Genus: Teucocranon; Berio, 1937
- Species: T. microcallia

Binomial name
- Teucocranon microcallia Berio, 1937

Genus of moths

Teucocranon is a monotypic moth genus of the family Noctuidae. Its only species, Teucocranon microcallia, is found in Somalia and Somaliland. Both the genus and species were first described by Emilio Berio in 1937.
