= Paralacydes fiorii =

Scientific classification
- Domain: Eukaryota
- Kingdom: Animalia
- Phylum: Arthropoda
- Class: Insecta
- Order: Lepidoptera
- Superfamily: Noctuoidea
- Family: Erebidae
- Subfamily: Arctiinae
- Genus: Paralacydes
- Species: P. fiorii

Binomial name
- Paralacydes fiorii (Berio, 1937)

Synonyms
- Maenas fiorii Berio, 1937

Species of moth

Paralacydes fiorii is a moth of the family Erebidae. It was described by Emilio Berio in 1937. It lives in Kenya, Somalia and Tanzania.
