= Amsacta paolii =

Scientific classification
- Kingdom: Animalia
- Phylum: Arthropoda
- Class: Insecta
- Order: Lepidoptera
- Superfamily: Noctuoidea
- Family: Erebidae
- Subfamily: Arctiinae
- Genus: Amsacta
- Species: A. paolii

Binomial name
- Amsacta paolii Berio, 1936

Species of moth

Amsacta paolii is a moth of the family Erebidae. It was described by Emilio Berio in 1936 and is found in Somalia.
