= Giubicolanta =

Scientific classification
- Domain: Eukaryota
- Kingdom: Animalia
- Phylum: Arthropoda
- Class: Insecta
- Order: Lepidoptera
- Superfamily: Noctuoidea
- Family: Noctuidae
- Subfamily: Acontiinae
- Genus: Giubicolanta; Berio, 1937
- Species: G. orientalis

Binomial name
- Giubicolanta orientalis Berio, 1937

Genus of moths

Giubicolanta is a monotypic moth genus of the family Noctuidae. Its only species, Giubicolanta orientalis, is found in Somalia and Somaliland. Both the genus and species were first described by Emilio Berio in 1937.
