= Tuerta pastocyana =

Scientific classification
- Kingdom: Animalia
- Phylum: Arthropoda
- Class: Insecta
- Order: Lepidoptera
- Superfamily: Noctuoidea
- Family: Noctuidae
- Genus: Tuerta
- Species: T. pastocyana

Binomial name
- Tuerta pastocyana Berio, 1940

Species of moth

Tuerta pastocyana is a moth of the family Noctuidae. It is found in Somalia.
