= Croperoides =

Scientific classification
- Domain: Eukaryota
- Kingdom: Animalia
- Phylum: Arthropoda
- Class: Insecta
- Order: Lepidoptera
- Superfamily: Noctuoidea
- Family: Erebidae
- Tribe: Lymantriini
- Genus: Croperoides; Berio, 1940
- Species: C. negrottoi

Binomial name
- Croperoides negrottoi Berio, 1940

Genus of moths

Croperoides is a monotypic of moth genus in the subfamily Lymantriinae. Its only species, Croperoides negrottoi, was found in Negele Borana, Ethiopia, by the Società Entomologica Italiana. Both the genus and the species were first described by Emilio Berio in 1940.
