= Microraphe =

Scientific classification
- Domain: Eukaryota
- Kingdom: Animalia
- Phylum: Arthropoda
- Class: Insecta
- Order: Lepidoptera
- Superfamily: Noctuoidea
- Family: Noctuidae
- Subfamily: Acontiinae
- Genus: Microraphe; Berio, 1937
- Species: M. fiorii

Binomial name
- Microraphe fiorii (Berio, 1937)

Synonyms
- Micrographe fiorii Berio, 1937

Genus of moths

Microraphe is a monotypic moth genus of the family Noctuidae. Its only species, Microraphe fiorii, is found in Somalia and Somaliland. Both the genus and species were first described by Emilio Berio in 1937.
