= Paralacydes minorata =

Scientific classification
- Kingdom: Animalia
- Phylum: Arthropoda
- Clade: Pancrustacea
- Class: Insecta
- Order: Lepidoptera
- Superfamily: Noctuoidea
- Family: Erebidae
- Subfamily: Arctiinae
- Genus: Paralacydes
- Species: P. minorata

Binomial name
- Paralacydes minorata (Berio, 1935)

Synonyms
- Maenas minorata Berio, 1935

Species of moth

Paralacydes minorata is a moth of the family Erebidae. It was described by Emilio Berio in 1935 and is found in Ethiopia, Kenya and Somalia.
