= Amata romeii =

Scientific classification
- Domain: Eukaryota
- Kingdom: Animalia
- Phylum: Arthropoda
- Class: Insecta
- Order: Lepidoptera
- Superfamily: Noctuoidea
- Family: Erebidae
- Subfamily: Arctiinae
- Genus: Amata
- Species: A. romeii

Binomial name
- Amata romeii Berio, 1941

Species of moth

Amata romeii is a moth of the family Erebidae. It was described by Emilio Berio in 1941 and is found in Somalia.
