= Donuctenusa =

Scientific classification
- Kingdom: Animalia
- Phylum: Arthropoda
- Class: Insecta
- Order: Lepidoptera
- Superfamily: Noctuoidea
- Family: Noctuidae (?)
- Subfamily: Catocalinae
- Genus: Donuctenusa; Berio, 1940
- Species: D. fiorii

Binomial name
- Donuctenusa fiorii Berio, 1940

Genus of moths

Donuctenusa is a monotypic moth genus of the family Noctuidae. Its only species, Donuctenusa fiorii, is found in Ethiopia. Both the genus and species were first described by Emilio Berio in 1940.
