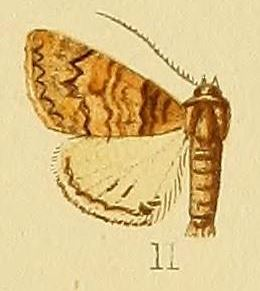
- Pericyma metaleuca

Scientific classification
- Kingdom: Animalia
- Phylum: Arthropoda
- Class: Insecta
- Order: Lepidoptera
- Superfamily: Noctuoidea
- Family: Erebidae
- Genus: Pericyma
- Species: P. metaleuca

Binomial name
- Pericyma metaleuca Hampson, 1913

= Pericyma metaleuca =

Species of moth

Pericyma metaleuca is a moth of the family Noctuidae. It is found in Africa and the Near East and is known from Ethiopia, Kenya, Mauritania, Oman, Saudi Arabia, Somalia, Tanzania and Yemen.

It has a wingspan of approx. 24mm.

== Subspecies ==
- Pericyma metaleuca metaleuca Hampson, 1913
- Pericyma metaleuca obscura Wiltshire, 1980 (Oman)
- Pericyma metaleuca mauritanica Hacker & Hausmann, 2010 (Mauritania)
