= Trichaeta pterophorina =

Scientific classification
- Kingdom: Animalia
- Phylum: Arthropoda
- Class: Insecta
- Order: Lepidoptera
- Superfamily: Noctuoidea
- Family: Erebidae
- Subfamily: Arctiinae
- Genus: Trichaeta
- Species: T. pterophorina

Binomial name
- Trichaeta pterophorina (Mabille, 1892)

Synonyms
- Synthomis pterophorina Mabille, 1892

Species of moth

Trichaeta pterophorina is a moth in the subfamily Arctiinae. It was described by Paul Mabille in 1892. It is found in the Republic of the Congo, the Democratic Republic of the Congo, Somalia, South Africa, Zambia and Zimbabwe.
