= Automolis meteus =

Scientific classification
- Kingdom: Animalia
- Phylum: Arthropoda
- Class: Insecta
- Order: Lepidoptera
- Superfamily: Noctuoidea
- Family: Erebidae
- Subfamily: Arctiinae
- Genus: Automolis
- Species: A. meteus

Binomial name
- Automolis meteus (Stoll, [1782])

Synonyms
- Sphinx meteus Stoll, [1782]

Species of moth

Automolis meteus is a moth of the family Erebidae. It was described by Stoll in 1782. It is found in Lesotho, Somalia and South Africa.

The larvae feed on Poaceae species, as well as Trema bracteolata, Gnidia, Acalypha and Lasiosiphon species.
