= Athetis satellitia =

Scientific classification
- Kingdom: Animalia
- Phylum: Arthropoda
- Class: Insecta
- Order: Lepidoptera
- Superfamily: Noctuoidea
- Family: Noctuidae
- Genus: Athetis
- Species: A. satellitia

Binomial name
- Athetis satellitia (Hampson, 1902)

Synonyms
- Caradrina satellitia Hampson, 1902

Species of moth

Athetis satellitia is a moth of the family Noctuidae. This species is known from Eritrea, Somalia, South Africa, Mozambique, Zambia, Congo and Madagascar.

The female of this moth is greyish brown, head whitish. Forewings with white points on the costa at the lines, white points in cell before and in the middle. Hindwings are pale strongly suffused with brown the cilia ochreous at the tips. The wingspan is approx. 32 mm.
