= Aetheometra =

Scientific classification
- Kingdom: Animalia
- Phylum: Arthropoda
- Clade: Pancrustacea
- Class: Insecta
- Order: Lepidoptera
- Family: Geometridae
- Subfamily: Geometrinae
- Genus: Aetheometra; Prout, 1931

Monotypic genus of geometer moths

Aetheometra is a monotypic moth genus in the family Geometridae. Its only species is Aetheometra iconoclasis. Both the genus and species were first described by Prout in 1931.
