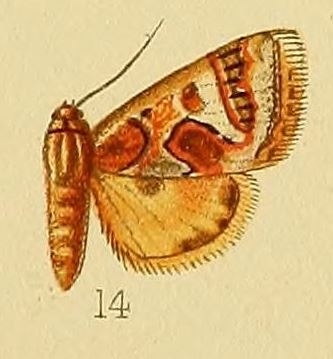

Scientific classification
- Kingdom: Animalia
- Phylum: Arthropoda
- Class: Insecta
- Order: Lepidoptera
- Superfamily: Noctuoidea
- Family: Erebidae
- Genus: Cerocala
- Species: C. munda

Binomial name
- Cerocala munda H. Druce, 1900

= Cerocala munda =

Species of moth

Cerocala munda is a moth of the family Erebidae first described by Herbert Druce in 1900.

== Distribution ==
It is found in Somalia.
