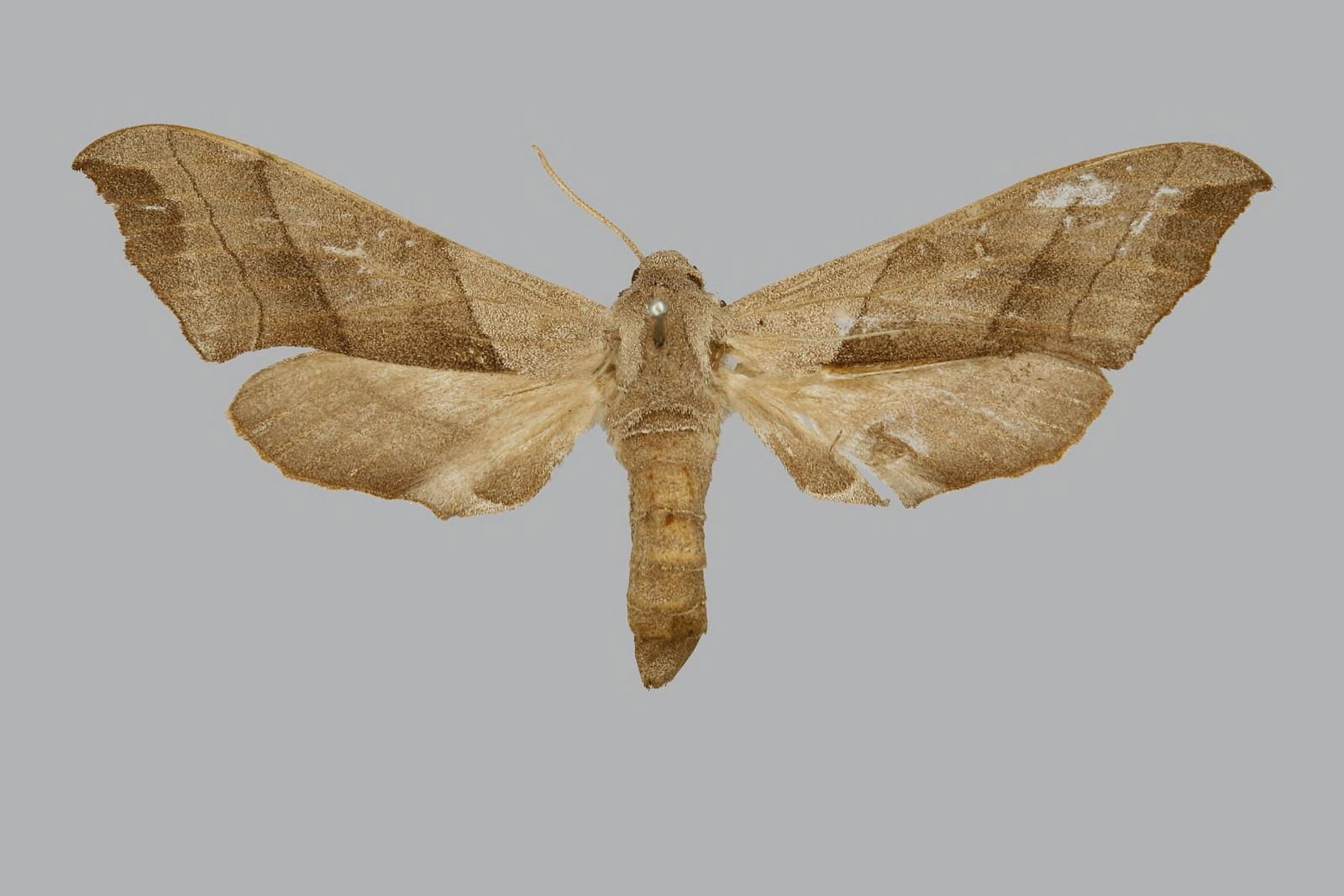
- Polyptychoides niloticus niloticus, female

Scientific classification
- Kingdom: Animalia
- Phylum: Arthropoda
- Class: Insecta
- Order: Lepidoptera
- Family: Sphingidae
- Genus: Polyptychoides
- Species: P. niloticus

Binomial name
- Polyptychoides niloticus (Jordan, 1921)

Synonyms
- Polyptychus niloticus Jordan, 1921; Polyptychus unilineata Clark, 1935

= Polyptychoides niloticus =

Species of moth

Polyptychoides niloticus is a moth of the family Sphingidae. It is found from Zambia to Sudan, Ethiopia and Somalia.

== Subspecies ==
- Polyptychoides niloticus niloticus
- Polyptychoides niloticus ponens Pierre, 1989 (Tchad)
