= Catephia mesonephele =

Scientific classification
- Kingdom: Animalia
- Phylum: Arthropoda
- Class: Insecta
- Order: Lepidoptera
- Superfamily: Noctuoidea
- Family: Erebidae
- Genus: Catephia
- Species: C. mesonephele

Binomial name
- Catephia mesonephele Hampson, 1916

Species of moth

Catephia mesonephele is a species of moth of the family Erebidae. It is found in Eritrea, Ethiopia and Kenya.

The wingspan is about 24 mm. The forewings are grey-white, tinged with brown. The basal area is partly suffused with dark brown. The subbasal line is black and sinuous and the antemedial line is black, defined on the inner side by white. The medial area has an oblique bright red-brown fascia. The claviform spot is defined by black and the orbicular and reniform spots are white and incompletely defined by brown. The postmedial line is black with a faint brown line beyond it. There is an oblique red-brown shade from the apex and a faint postmedial line, as well as a waved black terminal line forming points at the interspaces. The hindwings are pure white, with a fuscous brown terminal area.
