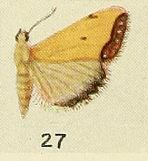

Scientific classification
- Domain: Eukaryota
- Kingdom: Animalia
- Phylum: Arthropoda
- Class: Insecta
- Order: Lepidoptera
- Superfamily: Noctuoidea
- Family: Erebidae
- Genus: Phytometra
- Species: P. pentheus

Binomial name
- Phytometra pentheus Fawcett, 1916

Synonyms
- Phytometra subflavalis pentheus (Fawcett, 1916)

= Phytometra pentheus =

Species of moth

Phytometra pentheus is a species of moth of the family Erebidae first described by James Farish Malcolm Fawcett in 1916. It is found in Eritrea and Somalia.
