= Heliothis leucosticta =

Scientific classification
- Kingdom: Animalia
- Phylum: Arthropoda
- Class: Insecta
- Order: Lepidoptera
- Superfamily: Noctuoidea
- Family: Noctuidae
- Genus: Heliothis
- Species: H. leucosticta

Binomial name
- Heliothis leucosticta (Hampson, 1902)

Synonyms
- Masalia leucosticta (Hampson, 1902); Timora leucosticta Hampson, 1902

Species of moth

Heliothis leucosticta is a species of moth of the family Noctuidae first described by George Hampson in 1902. It is found in Africa, including Botswana and South Africa.
