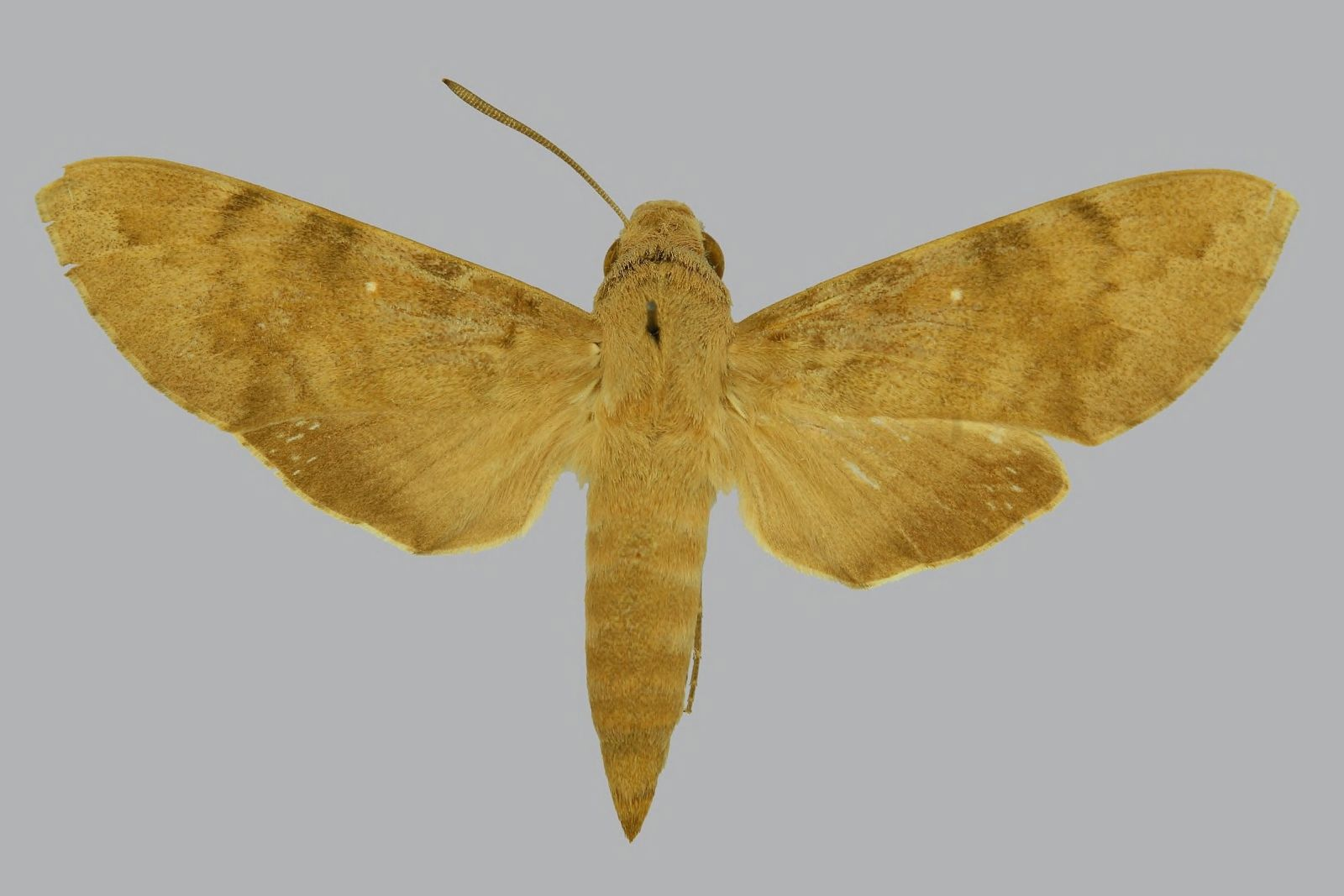

Scientific classification
- Kingdom: Animalia
- Phylum: Arthropoda
- Class: Insecta
- Order: Lepidoptera
- Family: Sphingidae
- Genus: Nephele
- Species: N. xylina

Binomial name
- Nephele xylina Rothschild & Jordan, 1910

Synonyms
- Nephele vespera Fawcett, 1916

= Nephele xylina =

Species of moth

Nephele xylina is a moth of the family Sphingidae. It is known from semi-deserts from Kenya to Ethiopia and Somalia.
