= Amata velatipennis =

Scientific classification
- Kingdom: Animalia
- Phylum: Arthropoda
- Class: Insecta
- Order: Lepidoptera
- Superfamily: Noctuoidea
- Family: Erebidae
- Subfamily: Arctiinae
- Genus: Amata
- Species: A. velatipennis

Binomial name
- Amata velatipennis (Walker, 1864)

Synonyms
- Syntomis velatipennis Walker, 1864

Species of moth

Amata velatipennis is a moth of the family Erebidae. It was described by Francis Walker in 1864. It is found in Ethiopia and Somalia.

== Description ==
Amata velatipennis is blackish green, with a white section on the upper side of its antennae towards the tip. Its abdomen has four crimson bands with one at the base, and the other three in the middle of the abdomen. It has very broad forewings, and smaller hindwings. The holotype was measured at 6 lines in length, and its wings at 18 lines. The colouration of the wings distinguishes it from other species in the genus.
