= Scopula sagittilinea =

Scientific classification
- Domain: Eukaryota
- Kingdom: Animalia
- Phylum: Arthropoda
- Class: Insecta
- Order: Lepidoptera
- Family: Geometridae
- Genus: Scopula
- Species: S. sagittilinea

Binomial name
- Scopula sagittilinea (Warren, 1897)

Synonyms
- Craspedia sagittilinea Warren, 1897

Species of geometer moth in subfamily Sterrhinae

Scopula sagittilinea is a moth of the family Geometridae. It was described by Warren in 1897. It is found in Kenya, Somalia and Tanzania.
