= Xanthomera =

Scientific classification
- Kingdom: Animalia
- Phylum: Arthropoda
- Class: Insecta
- Order: Lepidoptera
- Superfamily: Noctuoidea
- Family: Noctuidae
- Subfamily: Acontiinae
- Genus: Xanthomera; Hampson, 1914
- Species: X. leucoglene

Binomial name
- Xanthomera leucoglene (Mabille, 1880)

Synonyms
- Generic: Xanthozona Hampson, 1910; Specific: Erastria leucoglene; Metachrostis robusta (Saalmüller, 1891)

Genus of moths

Xanthomera is a monotypic moth genus of the family Noctuidae erected by George Hampson in 1914. Its only species, Xanthomera leucoglene, was first described by Paul Mabille in 1880. It is found in central, southern and eastern Africa and on Madagascar.

Its wingspan is 18 mm.
