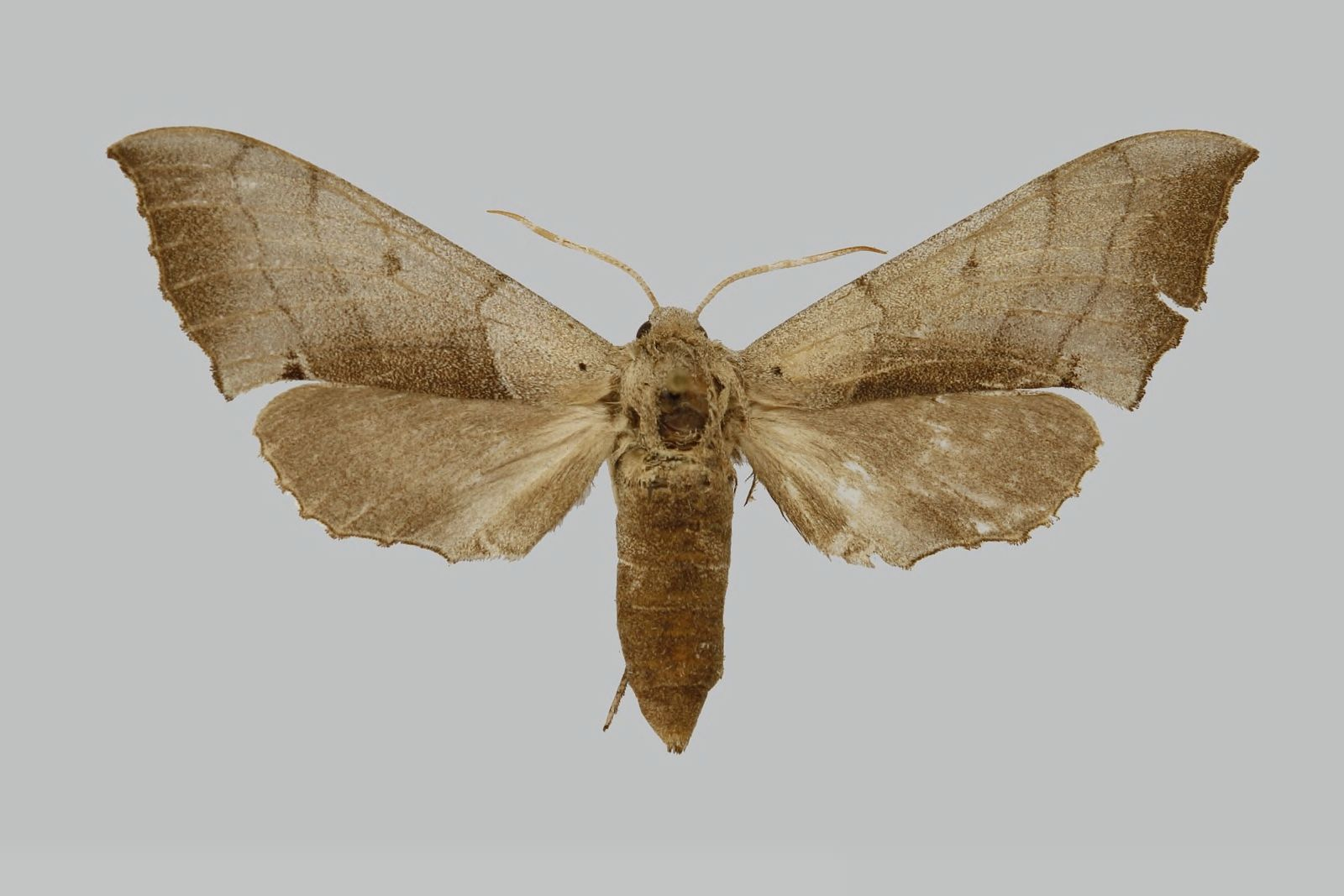

Scientific classification
- Kingdom: Animalia
- Phylum: Arthropoda
- Class: Insecta
- Order: Lepidoptera
- Family: Sphingidae
- Tribe: Smerinthini
- Genus: Microclanis; Carcasson, 1968
- Species: M. erlangeri

Binomial name
- Microclanis erlangeri (Rothschild & Jordan, 1903)

Synonyms
- Polyptychus erlangeri Rothschild & Jordan, 1903

= Microclanis =

Genus of moths

Microclanis is a genus of moths in the family Sphingidae, containing one species, Microclanis erlangeri, which is known from arid bush from central Tanzania to eastern and northern Kenya, Ethiopia and Somalia.
