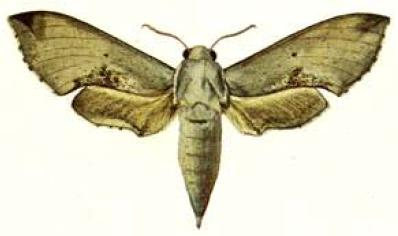

Scientific classification
- Kingdom: Animalia
- Phylum: Arthropoda
- Class: Insecta
- Order: Lepidoptera
- Family: Sphingidae
- Genus: Hippotion
- Species: H. rosae

Binomial name
- Hippotion rosae (Butler, 1882)

Synonyms
- Darapsa rosae Butler, 1882

= Hippotion rosae =

Species of moth

Hippotion rosae is a moth of the family Sphingidae first described by Arthur Gardiner Butler in 1882. It is found in Africa.

The length of the forewings is 40–43 mm for males and 41–45 mm for females and the wingspan is 74–99 mm.

The larvae feed on the leaves of Cissus species.

== Subspecies ==
- Hippotion rosae rosae
- Hippotion rosae guichardi Carcasson, 1968 (Yemen, Socotra)
