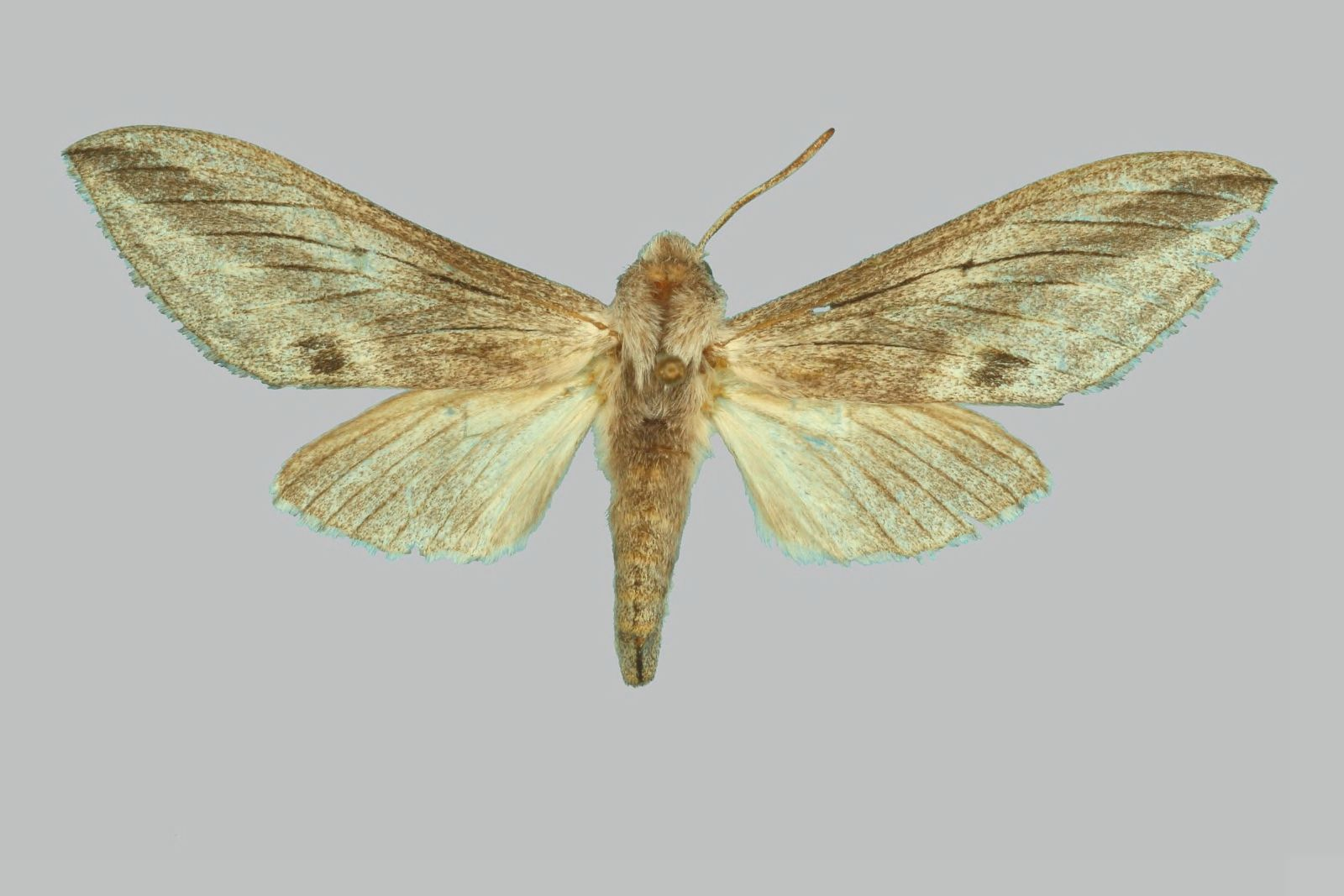
- Male

Scientific classification
- Domain: Eukaryota
- Kingdom: Animalia
- Phylum: Arthropoda
- Class: Insecta
- Order: Lepidoptera
- Family: Sphingidae
- Tribe: Sphingini
- Genus: Ellenbeckia; Rothschild & Jordan, 1903
- Species: E. monospila

Binomial name
- Ellenbeckia monospila Rothschild & Jordan, 1903

= Ellenbeckia =

Genus of moths

Ellenbeckia is a genus of moths in the family Sphingidae, consisting of one species Ellenbeckia monospila, which is known from arid areas in Kenya and Somalia.

The length of the forewings is about 19 mm for males and 21 mm for females.
