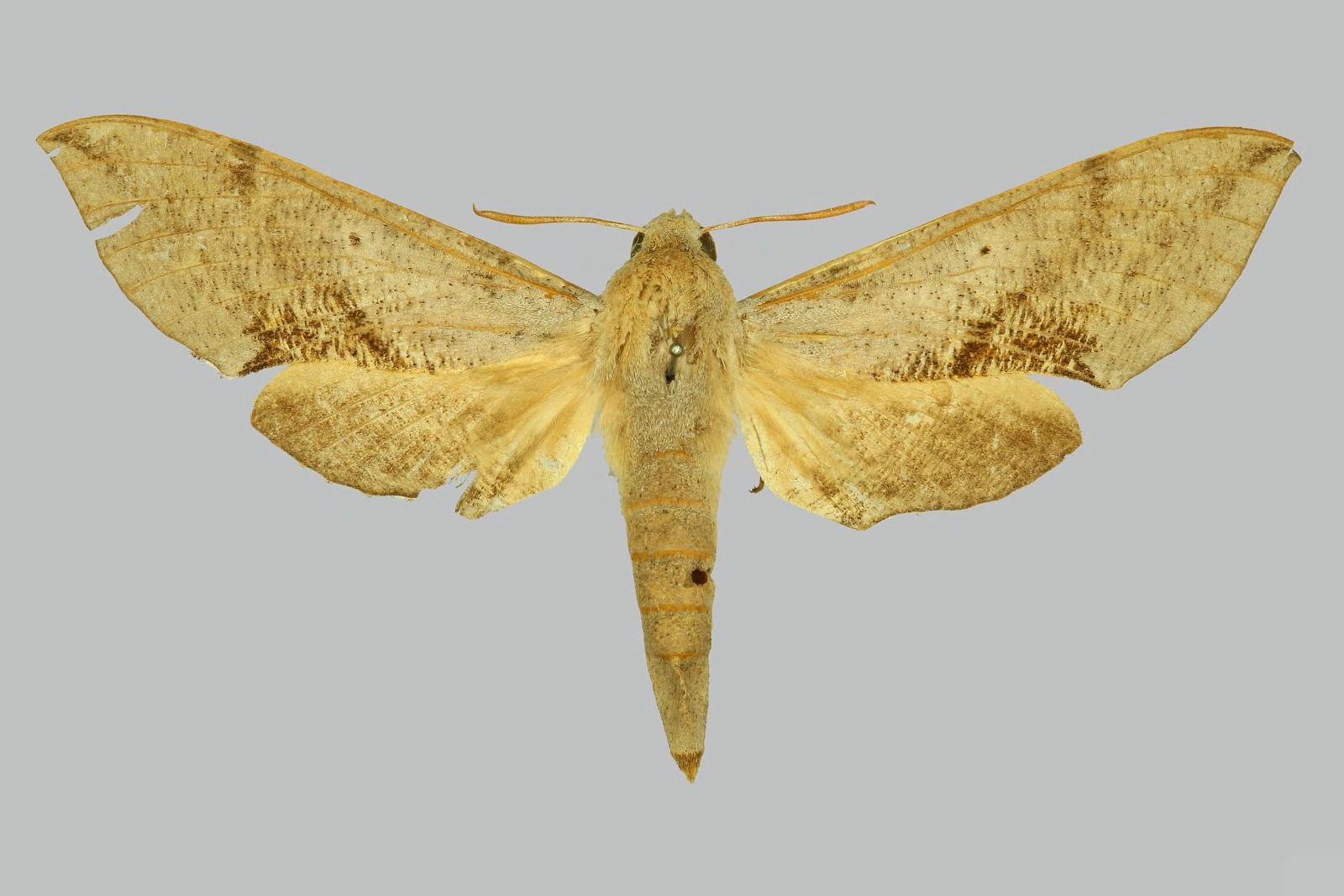

Scientific classification
- Kingdom: Animalia
- Phylum: Arthropoda
- Class: Insecta
- Order: Lepidoptera
- Family: Sphingidae
- Genus: Hippotion
- Species: H. moorei

Binomial name
- Hippotion moorei Jordan, 1926

Synonyms
- Enpinanga nuimaculata Zhu & Wang, 1997; Hippotion moorei canens Jordan, 1926

= Hippotion moorei =

Species of moth

Hippotion moorei is a moth of the family Sphingidae. It is known from dry areas from northern Tanzania to Ethiopia and Somalia.
