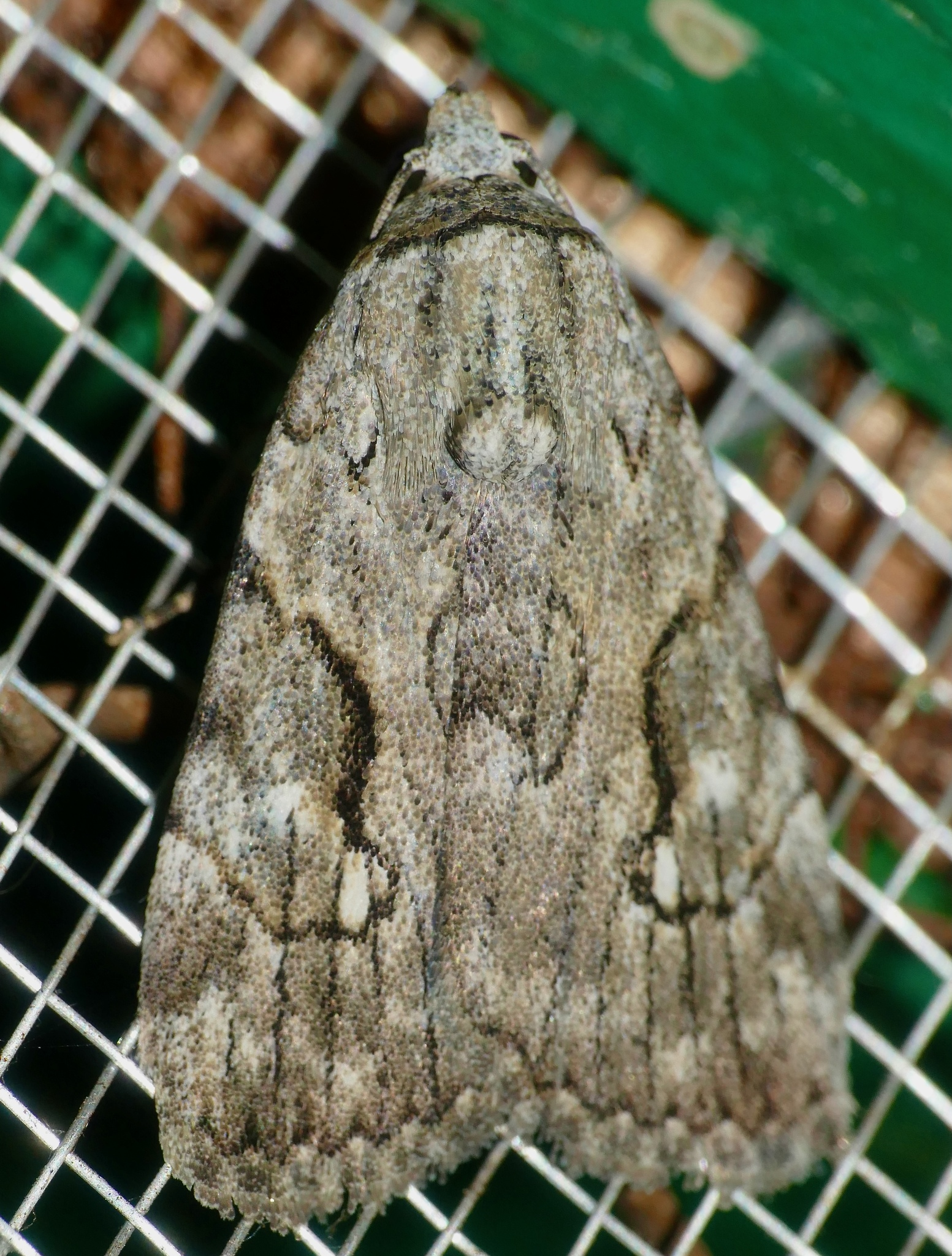

Scientific classification
- Kingdom: Animalia
- Phylum: Arthropoda
- Class: Insecta
- Order: Lepidoptera
- Superfamily: Noctuoidea
- Family: Erebidae
- Genus: Hypotacha
- Species: H. retracta

Binomial name
- Hypotacha retracta (Hampson, 1902)

Synonyms
- Audea retracta Hampson, 1902

= Hypotacha retracta =

Species of moth

Hypotacha retracta is a species of moth in the family Erebidae. It is found in Angola, Botswana, Namibia, Somalia, South Africa (Eastern Cape, KwaZulu-Natal) and Uganda.

== Subspecies ==
- Hypotacha retracta retracta
- Hypotacha retracta waterbergensis Kühne, 2004 (Namibia: Waterberg)
