= Galtara somaliensis =

Scientific classification
- Kingdom: Animalia
- Phylum: Arthropoda
- Class: Insecta
- Order: Lepidoptera
- Superfamily: Noctuoidea
- Family: Erebidae
- Subfamily: Arctiinae
- Genus: Galtara
- Species: G. somaliensis

Binomial name
- Galtara somaliensis (Hampson, 1916)

Synonyms
- Secusio somaliensis Hampson, 1916

Species of moth

Galtara somaliensis is a moth of the subfamily Arctiinae. It was described by George Hampson in 1916. It is found in Ethiopia, Oman, Saudi Arabia, Somalia and Yemen.
