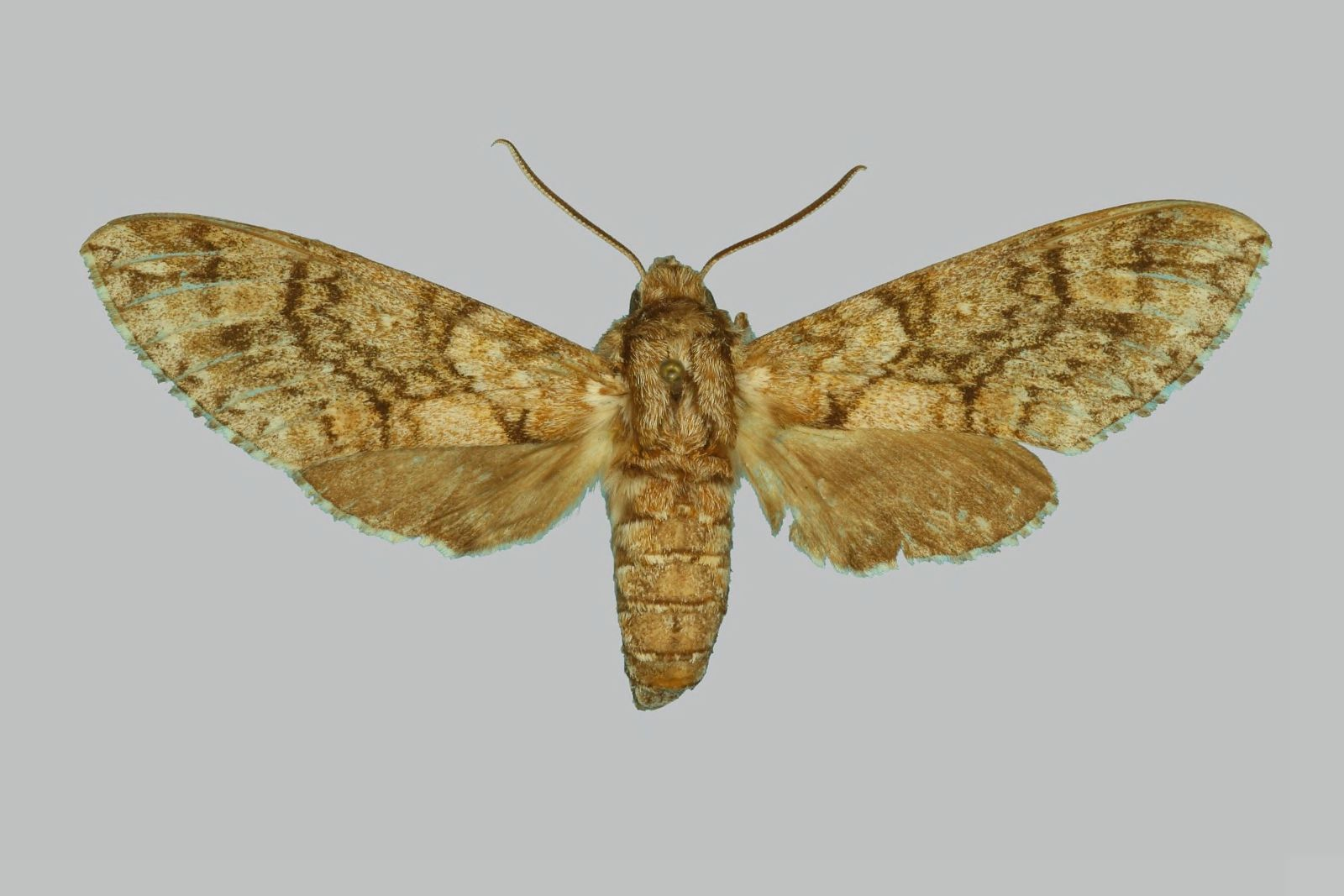
- Female Taboribia micra

Scientific classification
- Domain: Eukaryota
- Kingdom: Animalia
- Phylum: Arthropoda
- Class: Insecta
- Order: Lepidoptera
- Family: Sphingidae
- Genus: Poliana
- Species: P. micra

Binomial name
- Poliana micra Rothschild & Jordan, 1903

= Poliana micra =

Species of moth

Poliana micra is a moth of the family Sphingidae. It is known from arid scrubland from Somalia to eastern Kenya.

The length of the forewings is 22–28 mm.
