= Alpenus diversatus =

Scientific classification
- Kingdom: Animalia
- Phylum: Arthropoda
- Class: Insecta
- Order: Lepidoptera
- Superfamily: Noctuoidea
- Family: Erebidae
- Subfamily: Arctiinae
- Genus: Alpenus
- Species: A. diversatus

Binomial name
- Alpenus diversatus (Hampson, 1916)

Synonyms
- Diacrisia diversata Hampson, 1916; Alpenus diversata

Species of moth

Alpenus diversatus is a moth of the subfamily Arctiinae. It was described by George Hampson in 1916. It is found in Somalia.
