= Amsactarctia venusta =

Scientific classification
- Kingdom: Animalia
- Phylum: Arthropoda
- Class: Insecta
- Order: Lepidoptera
- Superfamily: Noctuoidea
- Family: Erebidae
- Subfamily: Arctiinae
- Genus: Amsactarctia
- Species: A. venusta

Binomial name
- Amsactarctia venusta (Toulgoët, 1980)

Synonyms
- Amsacta venusta Toulgoët, 1980

Species of moth

Amsactarctia venusta is a moth of the family Erebidae. It was described by Hervé de Toulgoët in 1980. It is found in Ethiopia and Somalia.
