= Scopula minoa =

Scientific classification
- Kingdom: Animalia
- Phylum: Arthropoda
- Clade: Pancrustacea
- Class: Insecta
- Order: Lepidoptera
- Family: Geometridae
- Genus: Scopula
- Species: S. minoa

Binomial name
- Scopula minoa (Prout, 1916)

Synonyms
- Acidalia minoa Prout, 1916

Species of geometer moth in subfamily Sterrhinae

Scopula minoa is a moth of the family Geometridae. It is found in Kenya.
