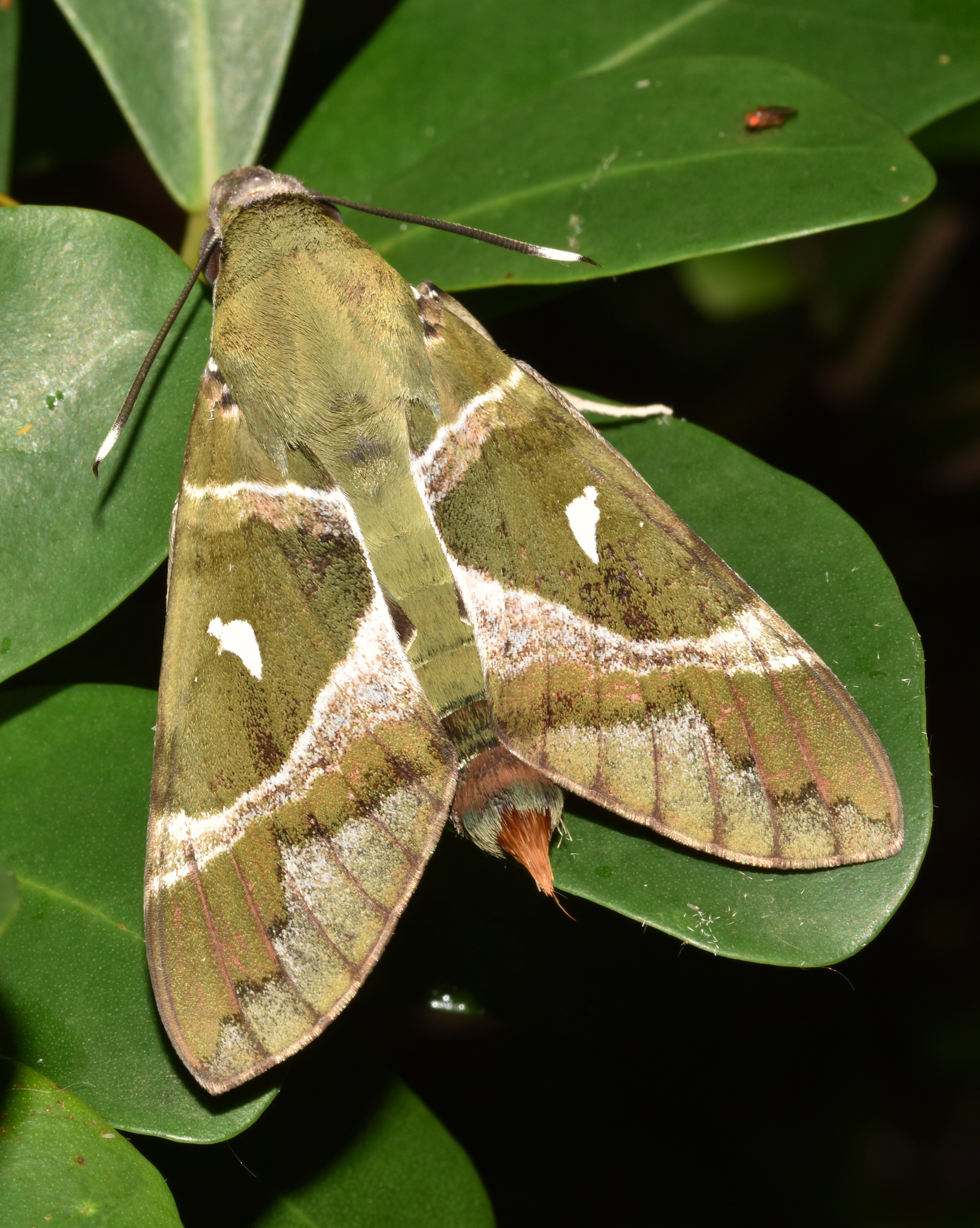

Scientific classification
- Kingdom: Animalia
- Phylum: Arthropoda
- Clade: Pancrustacea
- Class: Insecta
- Order: Lepidoptera
- Family: Sphingidae
- Genus: Nephele
- Species: N. argentifera

Binomial name
- Nephele argentifera (Walker, 1856)

Synonyms
- Zonilia argentifera Walker, 1856

= Nephele argentifera =

Species of moth

Nephele argentifera is a moth of the family Sphingidae. It is known from coastal bush and savanna from Somalia to northern South Africa.

The larvae feed on Carissa species.
