= Secusio discoidalis =

Scientific classification
- Kingdom: Animalia
- Phylum: Arthropoda
- Class: Insecta
- Order: Lepidoptera
- Superfamily: Noctuoidea
- Family: Erebidae
- Subfamily: Arctiinae
- Genus: Secusio
- Species: S. discoidalis

Binomial name
- Secusio discoidalis Talbot, 1929

Species of moth

Secusio discoidalis is a moth in the subfamily Arctiinae. It was described by George Talbot in 1929. It is found in Angola, the Democratic Republic of the Congo, Somalia and South Africa. The species host plants have yet to be discovered.
