= Cyclophora imperialis =

Scientific classification
- Kingdom: Animalia
- Phylum: Arthropoda
- Clade: Pancrustacea
- Class: Insecta
- Order: Lepidoptera
- Family: Geometridae
- Genus: Cyclophora
- Species: C. imperialis

Binomial name
- Cyclophora imperialis (Berio, 1937)

Synonyms
- Anisodes imperialis Berio, 1937

Species of moth

Cyclophora imperialis is a moth in the family Geometridae. It is found in Somalia.
