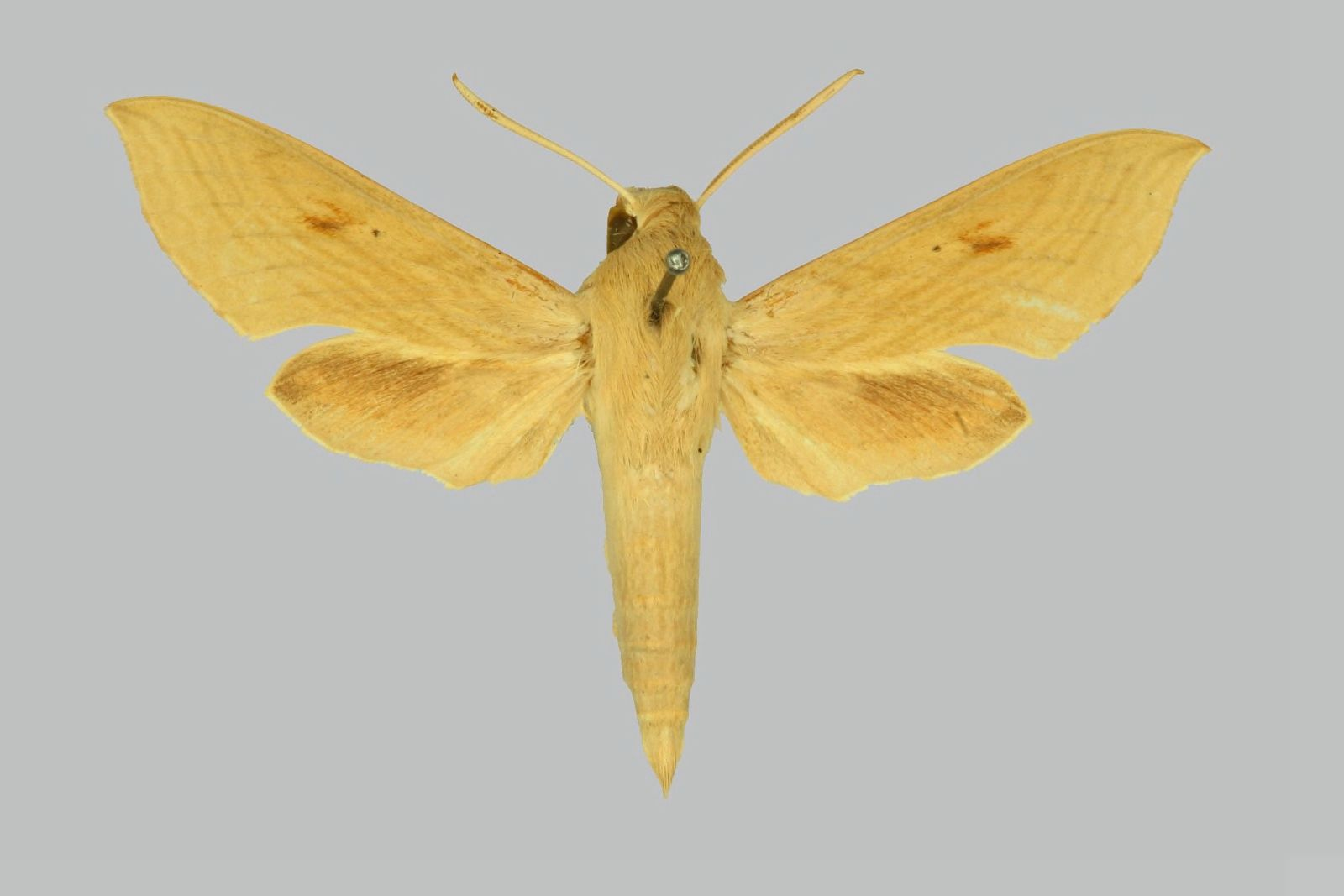

Scientific classification
- Kingdom: Animalia
- Phylum: Arthropoda
- Class: Insecta
- Order: Lepidoptera
- Family: Sphingidae
- Genus: Hippotion
- Species: H. pentagramma

Binomial name
- Hippotion pentagramma Hampson, 1910

Synonyms
- Hippotion pentagramma somalicum Jordan, 1916

= Hippotion pentagramma =

Species of moth

Hippotion pentagramma is a moth of the family Sphingidae. It is known from the arid areas in Arabia, Somalia and Ethiopia.
