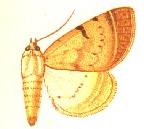

Scientific classification
- Kingdom: Animalia
- Phylum: Arthropoda
- Class: Insecta
- Order: Lepidoptera
- Superfamily: Noctuoidea
- Family: Noctuidae (?)
- Genus: Ctenusa
- Species: C. curvilinea

Binomial name
- Ctenusa curvilinea Hampson, 1913

Synonyms
- Ctenusa rectilinea Fawcett, 1916

= Ctenusa curvilinea =

Species of moth

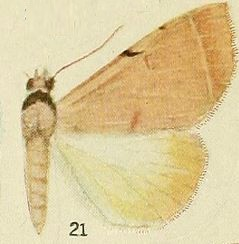
Ctenusa curvilinea

Ctenusa curvilinea is a moth of the family Noctuidae. The species can be found from Ethiopia and Eritrea south to South Africa.
