= Scopula nepheloperas =

Scientific classification
- Kingdom: Animalia
- Phylum: Arthropoda
- Clade: Pancrustacea
- Class: Insecta
- Order: Lepidoptera
- Family: Geometridae
- Genus: Scopula
- Species: S. nepheloperas

Binomial name
- Scopula nepheloperas (Prout, 1916)

Synonyms
- Acidalia nepheloperas Prout, 1916

Species of geometer moth in subfamily Sterrhinae

Scopula nepheloperas is a moth of the family Geometridae. It is found in Kenya, Niger and Sudan.
