= Estigmene griseata =

Scientific classification
- Kingdom: Animalia
- Phylum: Arthropoda
- Clade: Pancrustacea
- Class: Insecta
- Order: Lepidoptera
- Superfamily: Noctuoidea
- Family: Erebidae
- Subfamily: Arctiinae
- Genus: Estigmene
- Species: E. griseata

Binomial name
- Estigmene griseata Hampson, 1916

Species of moth

Estigmene griseata is a moth of the family Erebidae. It was described by George Hampson in 1916. It is found in Ethiopia, Kenya and Somalia.
