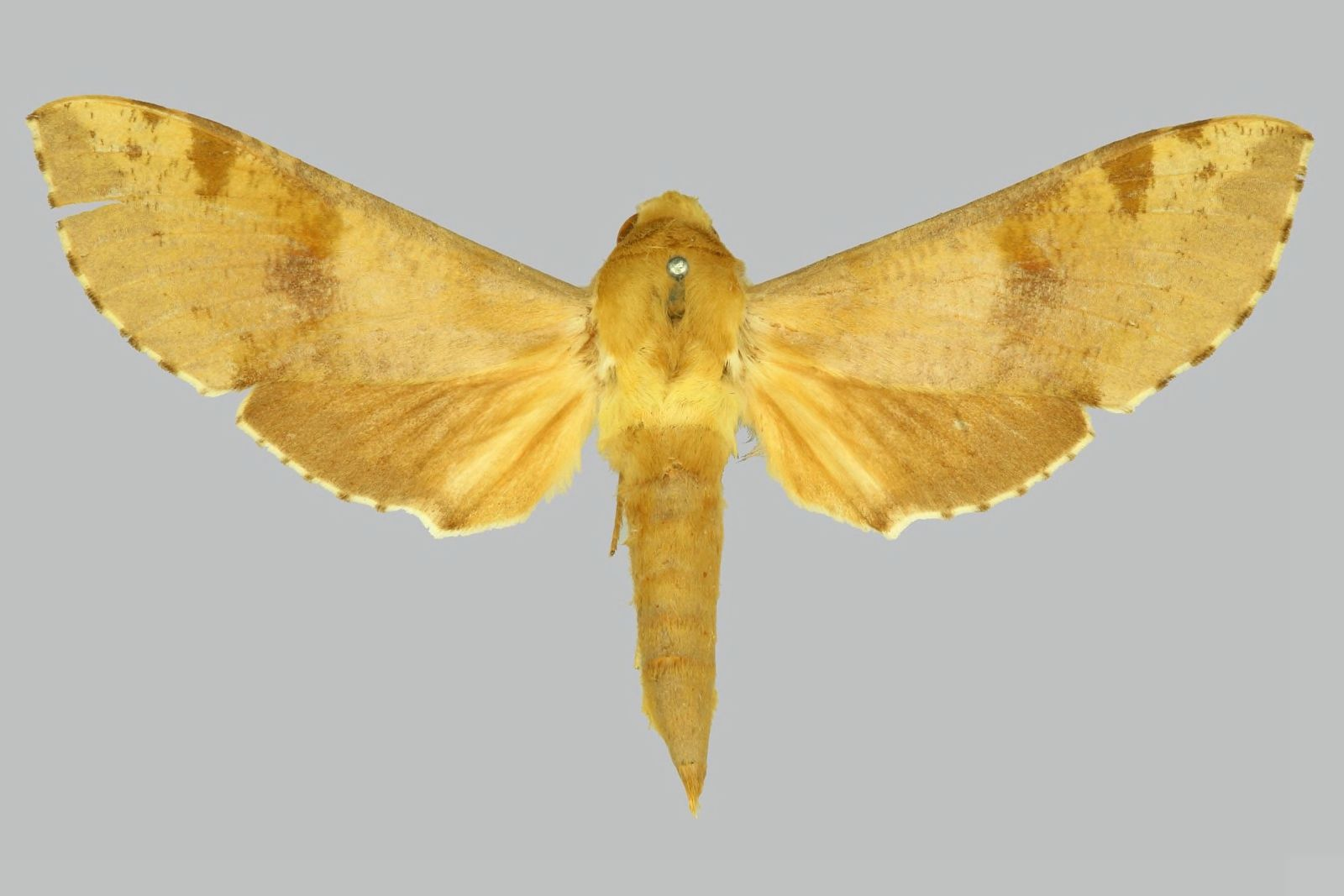

Scientific classification
- Kingdom: Animalia
- Phylum: Arthropoda
- Class: Insecta
- Order: Lepidoptera
- Family: Sphingidae
- Genus: Hippotion
- Species: H. socotrensis

Binomial name
- Hippotion socotrensis (Rebel, 1899)

Synonyms
- Metopsilus socotrensis Rebel, 1899

= Hippotion socotrensis =

Species of moth

Hippotion socotrensis is a moth of the family Sphingidae. It is known from dry areas from eastern Kenya to southern Ethiopia and Somalia. It is also present on Socotra.

== Subspecies ==
- Hippotion socotrensis socotrensis (Socotra)
- Hippotion socotrensis diyllus Fawcett, 1915 (dry areas from eastern Kenya to southern Ethiopia and probably Somalia)
