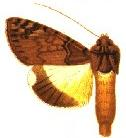

Scientific classification
- Kingdom: Animalia
- Phylum: Arthropoda
- Class: Insecta
- Order: Lepidoptera
- Superfamily: Noctuoidea
- Family: Erebidae
- Genus: Ulotrichopus
- Species: U. primulina

Binomial name
- Ulotrichopus primulina (Hampson, 1902)

Synonyms
- Audea primulina Hampson, 1902; Ulothrichopus primulina; Ulotrichopus primulinus; Ulotrichopus primulina ab. primulinodes Strand, 1913; Ulotrichopus primulina ab. primulinella Strand, 1913

= Ulotrichopus primulina =

Species of moth

Ulotrichopus primulina is a moth of the family Erebidae. It is found in Botswana, Cape Verde, Democratic Republic of Congo (Orientale, Katanga), Ethiopia, Kenya, Madagascar, Malawi, Mauritania, Somalia, South Africa and Tanzania.
