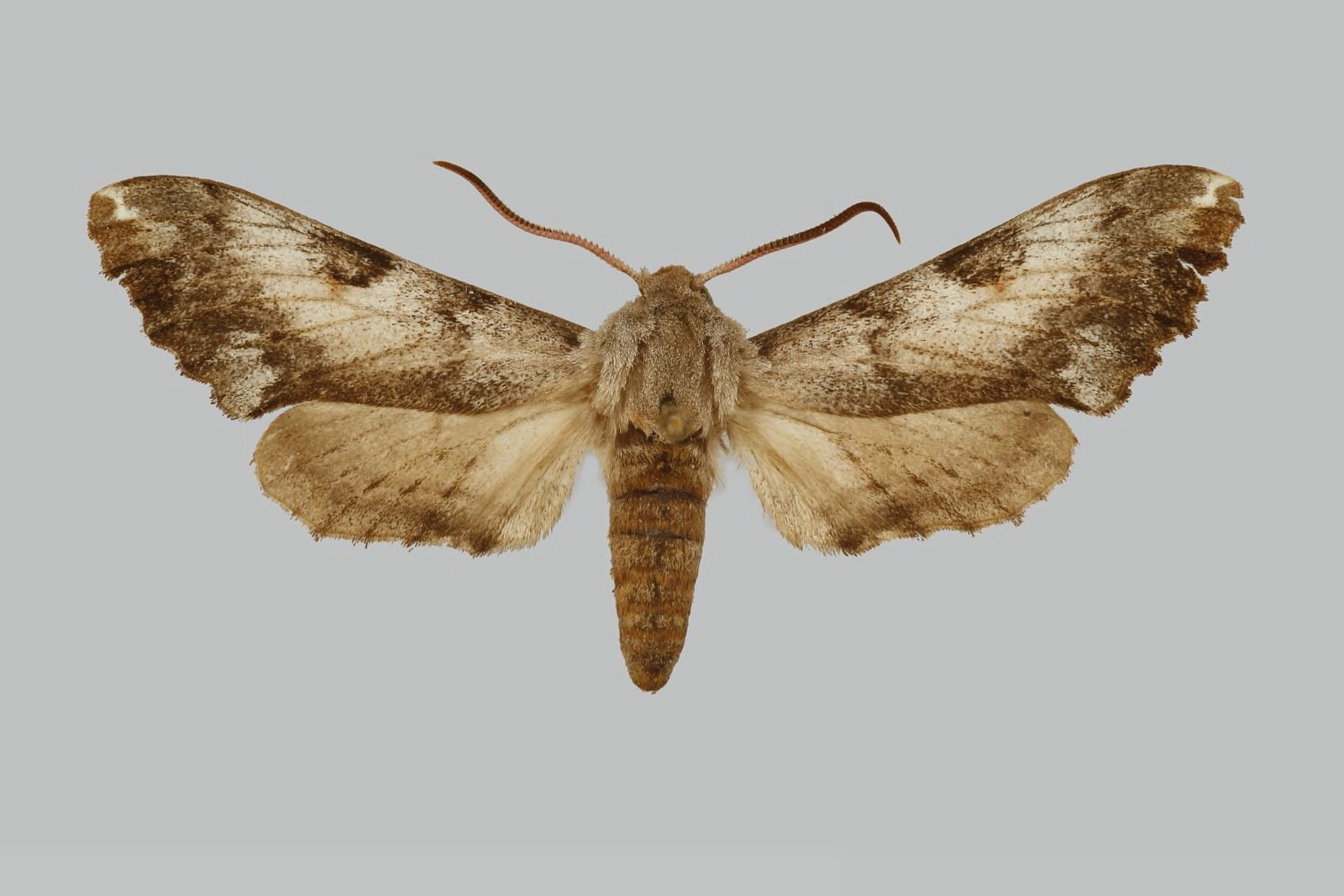

Scientific classification
- Domain: Eukaryota
- Kingdom: Animalia
- Phylum: Arthropoda
- Class: Insecta
- Order: Lepidoptera
- Family: Sphingidae
- Genus: Poliodes; Rothschild & Jordan, 1903
- Species: P. roseicornis

Binomial name
- Poliodes roseicornis Rothschild & Jordan, 1903

Synonyms
- Temnora erato Fawcett, 1915

= Poliodes =

Genus of moths

Poliodes is a genus of moths in the family Sphingidae, containing one species, Poliodes roseicornis, which is known from dry bush in Ethiopia, Somalia and Kenya.
