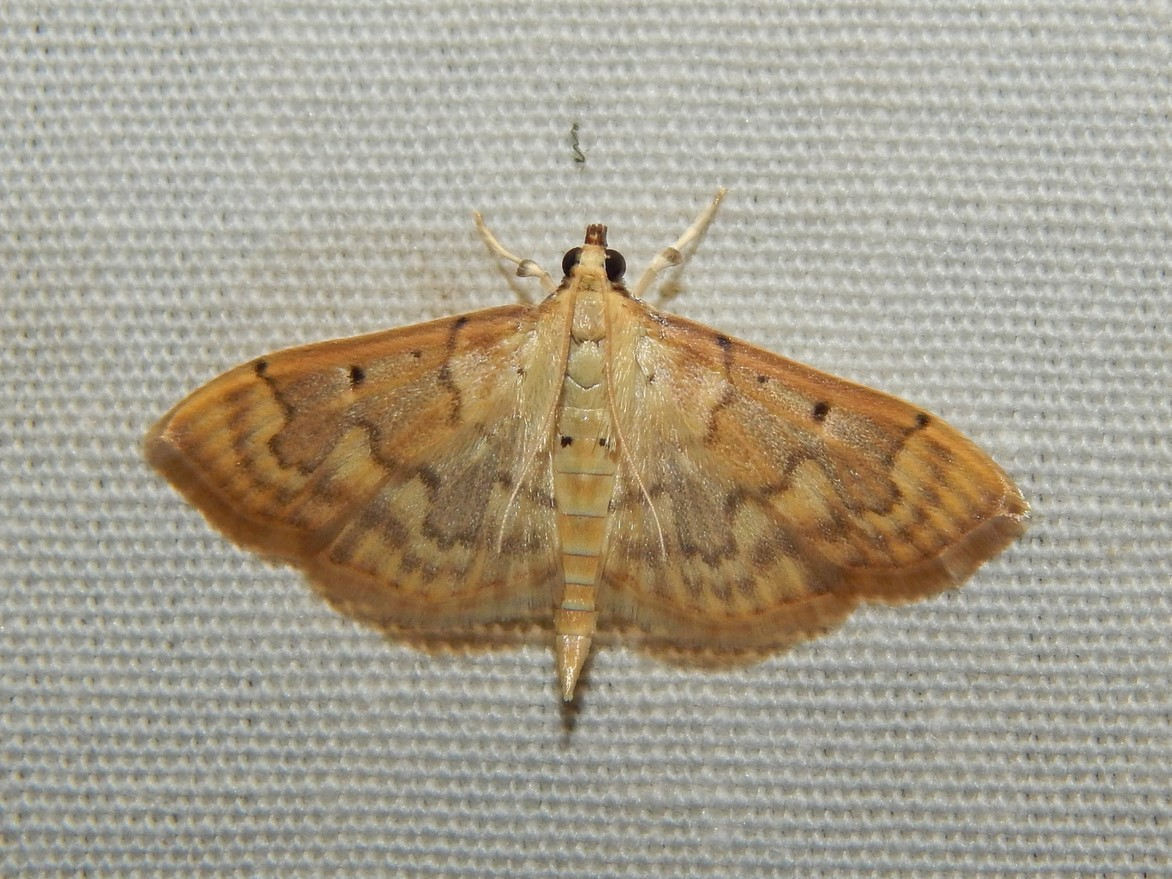

Scientific classification
- Kingdom: Animalia
- Phylum: Arthropoda
- Clade: Pancrustacea
- Class: Insecta
- Order: Lepidoptera
- Family: Crambidae
- Genus: Herpetogramma
- Species: H. mutualis

Binomial name
- Herpetogramma mutualis (Zeller, 1852)

Synonyms
- Botys mutualis Zeller, 1852; Herpetogramma mictualis

= Herpetogramma mutualis =

Species of moth

Herpetogramma mutualis is a species of moth in the family Crambidae. It was described by Zeller in 1852. It is found in the Democratic Republic of Congo (North Kivu, East Kasai, Equateur, Orientale), Namibia, Somalia, South Africa and Tanzania (Zanzibar).
