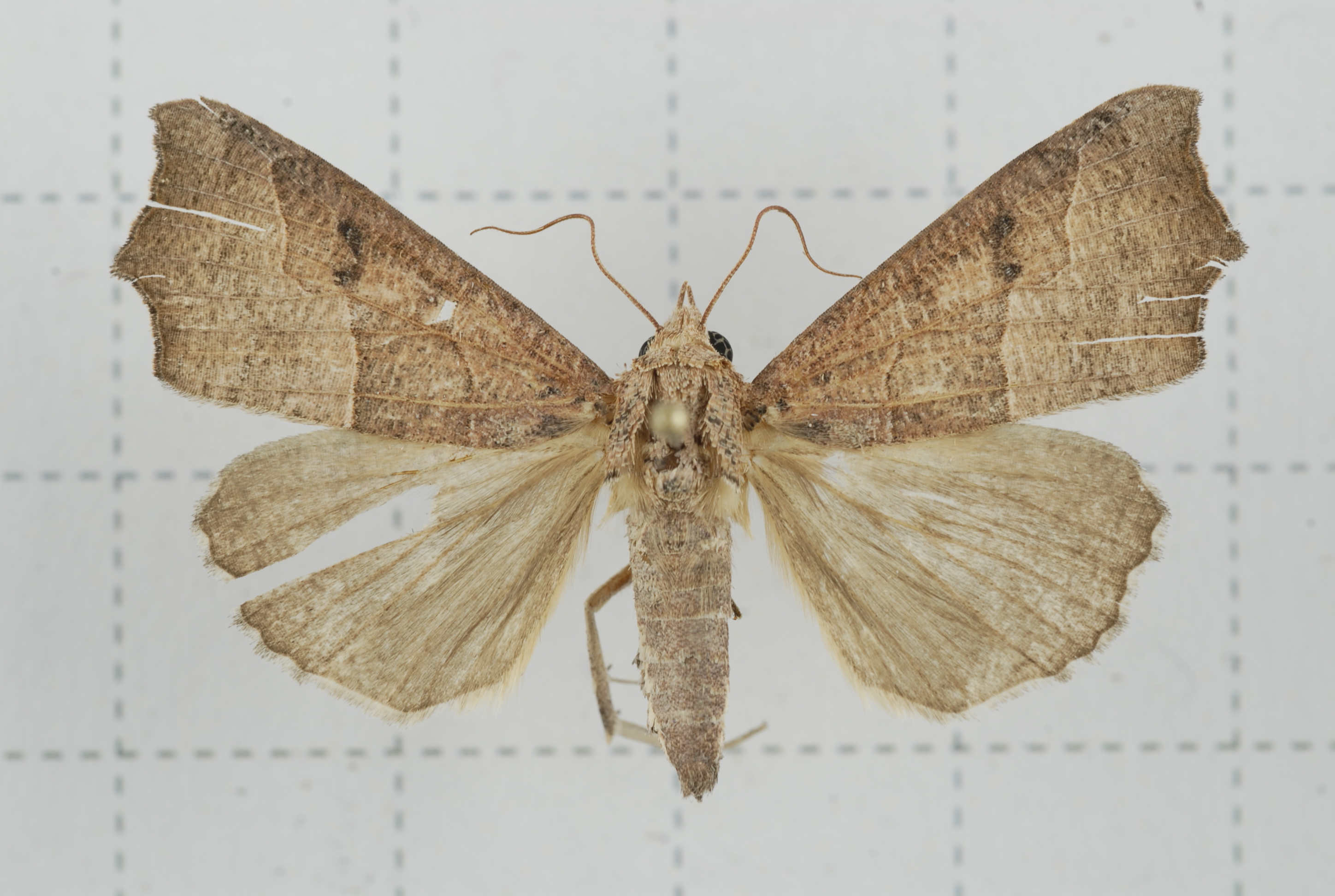

Scientific classification
- Kingdom: Animalia
- Phylum: Arthropoda
- Class: Insecta
- Order: Lepidoptera
- Superfamily: Noctuoidea
- Family: Erebidae
- Genus: Anomis
- Species: A. mesogona

Binomial name
- Anomis mesogona (Walker, 1857)

Synonyms
- Gonitis mesogonia Walker, 1857

= Anomis mesogona =

Species of moth

Anomis mesogona is a moth of the family Erebidae first described by Francis Walker in 1857. It is found in India, Sri Lanka, Somalia and Japan.

The caterpillar is known to feed on Citrus, Lantana camara, Rosa, Rubus and Vitis species.
