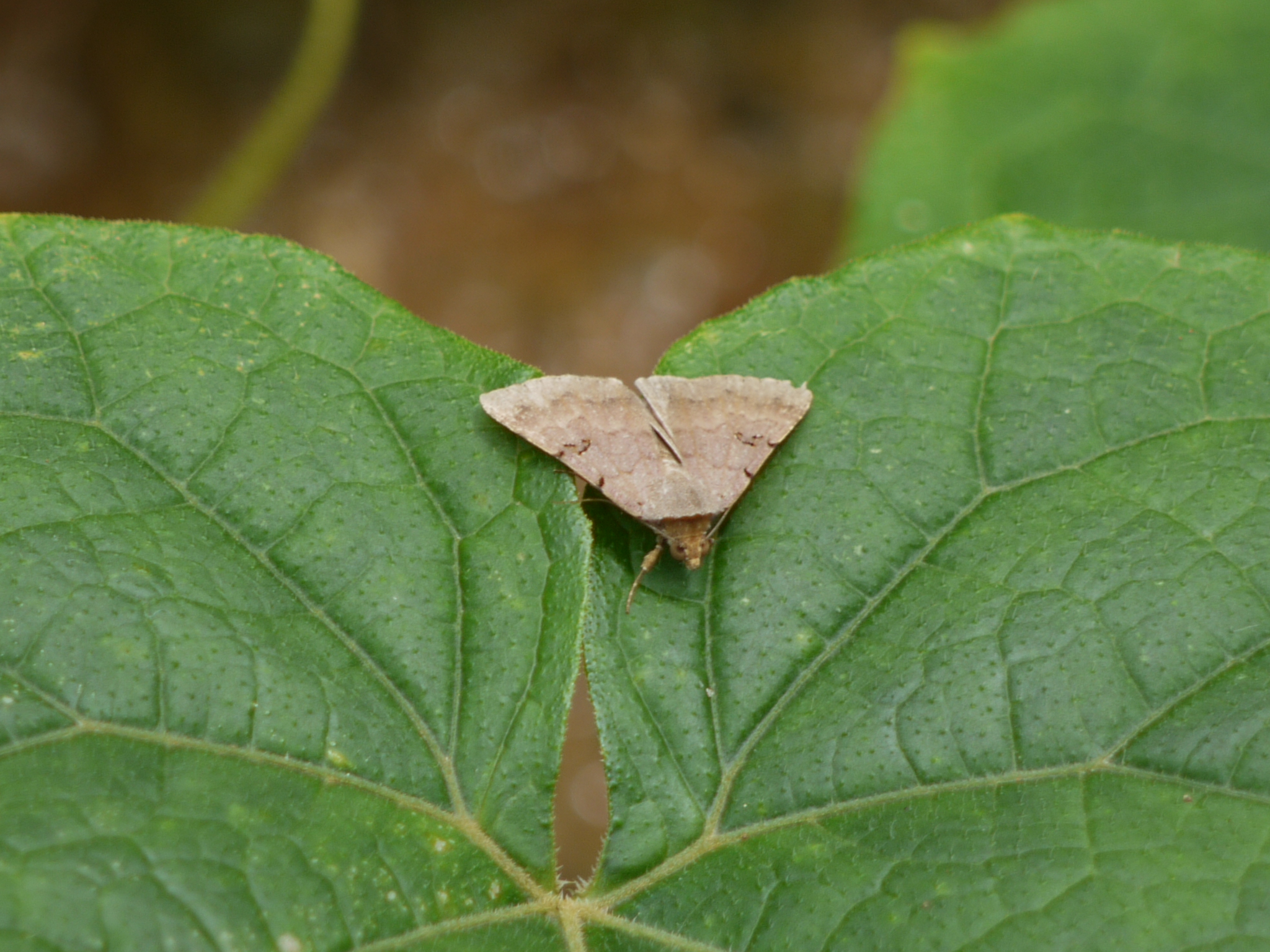

Scientific classification
- Kingdom: Animalia
- Phylum: Arthropoda
- Class: Insecta
- Order: Lepidoptera
- Superfamily: Noctuoidea
- Family: Erebidae
- Genus: Plecoptera
- Species: P. reflexa

Binomial name
- Plecoptera reflexa Guenée, 1852

= Plecoptera reflexa =

Species of moth

Plecoptera reflexa is a species of moth of the family Noctuidae first described by Achille Guenée in 1852. It is mainly found in India, but its range extends west as far as the central and northern parts of the coastal plains of Israel.

It is found in tropical and subtropical oases.

Adults are on wing from May to October. There are multiple generations per year.

The larvae feed on Dalbergia sissoo.
