= Hypotacha indecisa =

Scientific classification
- Kingdom: Animalia
- Phylum: Arthropoda
- Class: Insecta
- Order: Lepidoptera
- Superfamily: Noctuoidea
- Family: Erebidae
- Genus: Hypotacha
- Species: H. indecisa

Binomial name
- Hypotacha indecisa (Walker, 1858)

Synonyms
- Anthophila indecisa Walker, 1858; Caradrina sabulosa Swinhoe, 1884

Species of moth

Hypotacha indecisa is a species of moth in the family Erebidae. It lives in Somalia, Yemen, India and Pakistan.
