= Ceryx fulvescens =

Scientific classification
- Kingdom: Animalia
- Phylum: Arthropoda
- Class: Insecta
- Order: Lepidoptera
- Superfamily: Noctuoidea
- Family: Erebidae
- Subfamily: Arctiinae
- Genus: Ceryx
- Species: C. fulvescens

Binomial name
- Ceryx fulvescens (Walker, 1854)

Synonyms
- Syntomis fulvescens Walker, 1854; Thyretes caffraria Herrich-Schäffer, 1855; Syntomis molanna Wallengren, 1876; Naclia thyretiformis Wallengren, 1860; Trichaeta fulvescens

Species of moth

Ceryx fulvescens is a moth in the subfamily Arctiinae. It was described by Francis Walker in 1854. It is found in the Republic of the Congo, the Democratic Republic of the Congo, Kenya, Lesotho, Mozambique, Rwanda, Somalia, South Africa, Zambia and Zimbabwe.
