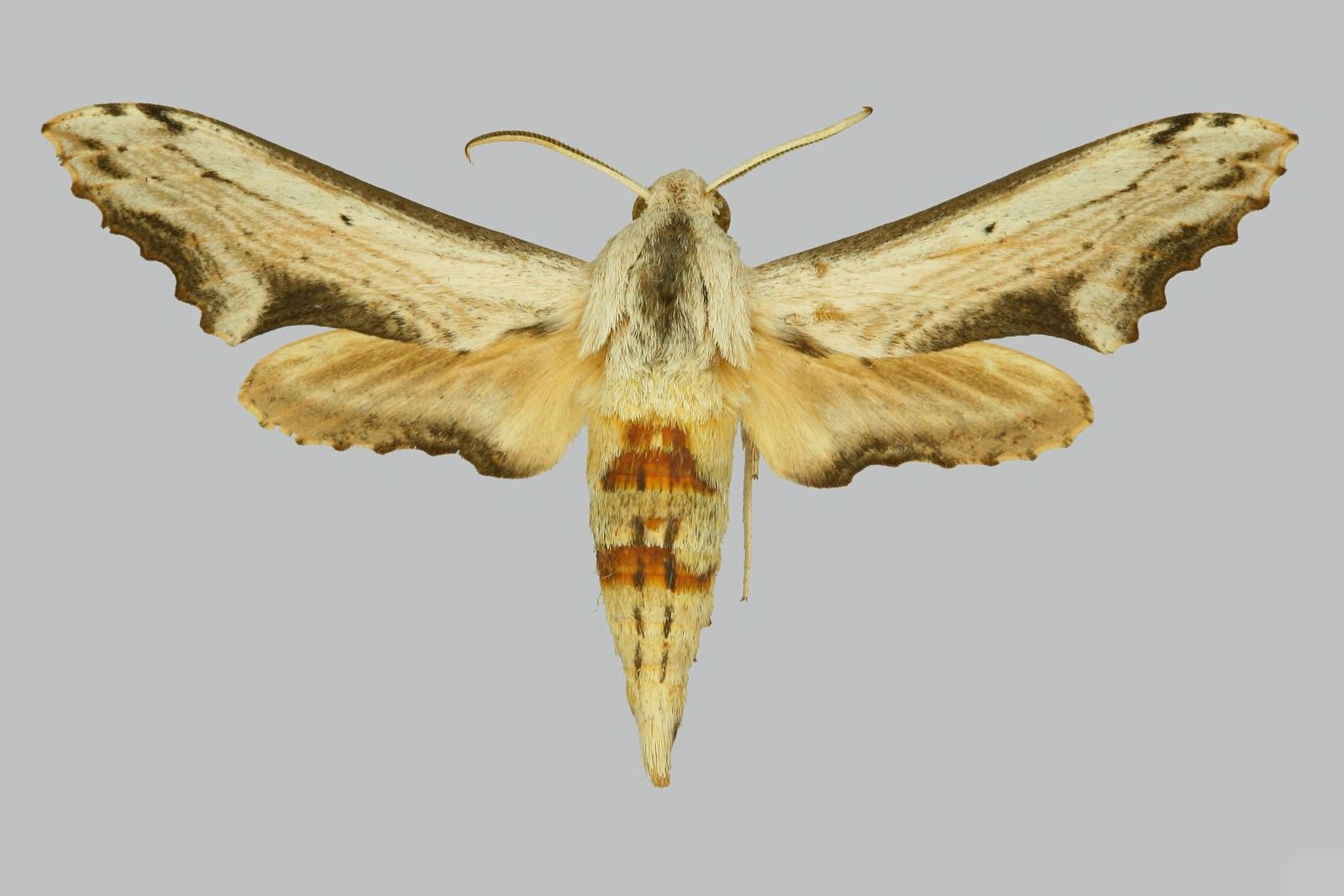

Scientific classification
- Kingdom: Animalia
- Phylum: Arthropoda
- Class: Insecta
- Order: Lepidoptera
- Family: Sphingidae
- Genus: Hippotion
- Species: H. stigma

Binomial name
- Hippotion stigma Rothschild & Jordan, 1903

= Hippotion stigma =

Species of moth

Hippotion stigma is a moth of the family Sphingidae. It is known from arid regions of eastern and northern Kenya, Ethiopia and Somalia.
