= Utetheisa amhara =

Scientific classification
- Domain: Eukaryota
- Kingdom: Animalia
- Phylum: Arthropoda
- Class: Insecta
- Order: Lepidoptera
- Superfamily: Noctuoidea
- Family: Erebidae
- Subfamily: Arctiinae
- Genus: Utetheisa
- Species: U. amhara

Binomial name
- Utetheisa amhara Jordan, 1939

Species of moth

Utetheisa amhara is a moth in the family Erebidae. It was described by Karl Jordan in 1939. It is found in Eritrea, Ethiopia, Kenya, Saudi Arabia, Somalia and the United Arab Emirates.
