= Ocinara ficicola =

Scientific classification
- Kingdom: Animalia
- Phylum: Arthropoda
- Class: Insecta
- Order: Lepidoptera
- Family: Bombycidae
- Genus: Ocinara
- Species: O. ficicola

Binomial name
- Ocinara ficicola (Ormerod, 1889)

Synonyms
- Trilocha ficicola Westwood & Ormerod, 1889

Species of moth

Ocinara ficicola is a moth in the family Bombycidae. It was described by Eleanor Anne Ormerod in 1889. It is found in the Democratic Republic of the Congo, Eritrea, Kenya, Nigeria, Somalia, South Africa and Uganda.

The larvae feed on Ficus species.
