= Eretmocera fasciata =

Scientific classification
- Domain: Eukaryota
- Kingdom: Animalia
- Phylum: Arthropoda
- Class: Insecta
- Order: Lepidoptera
- Family: Scythrididae
- Genus: Eretmocera
- Species: E. fasciata

Binomial name
- Eretmocera fasciata Walsingham, 1896

Species of moth

Eretmocera fasciata is a moth of the family Scythrididae. It was described by Baron Walsingham in 1896. It is found in Saudi Arabia, Yemen and Somalia.

The wingspan is about 9 mm. The forewings are bronzy greyish fuscous with a straight, transverse, pale whitish ochreous fascia before the middle, followed by a dorsal spot before the tornus and a rather larger costal spot of the same colour before the commencement of the cilia. There is some faint whitish ochreous speckling on the wing-surface. The hindwings are dark grey.
