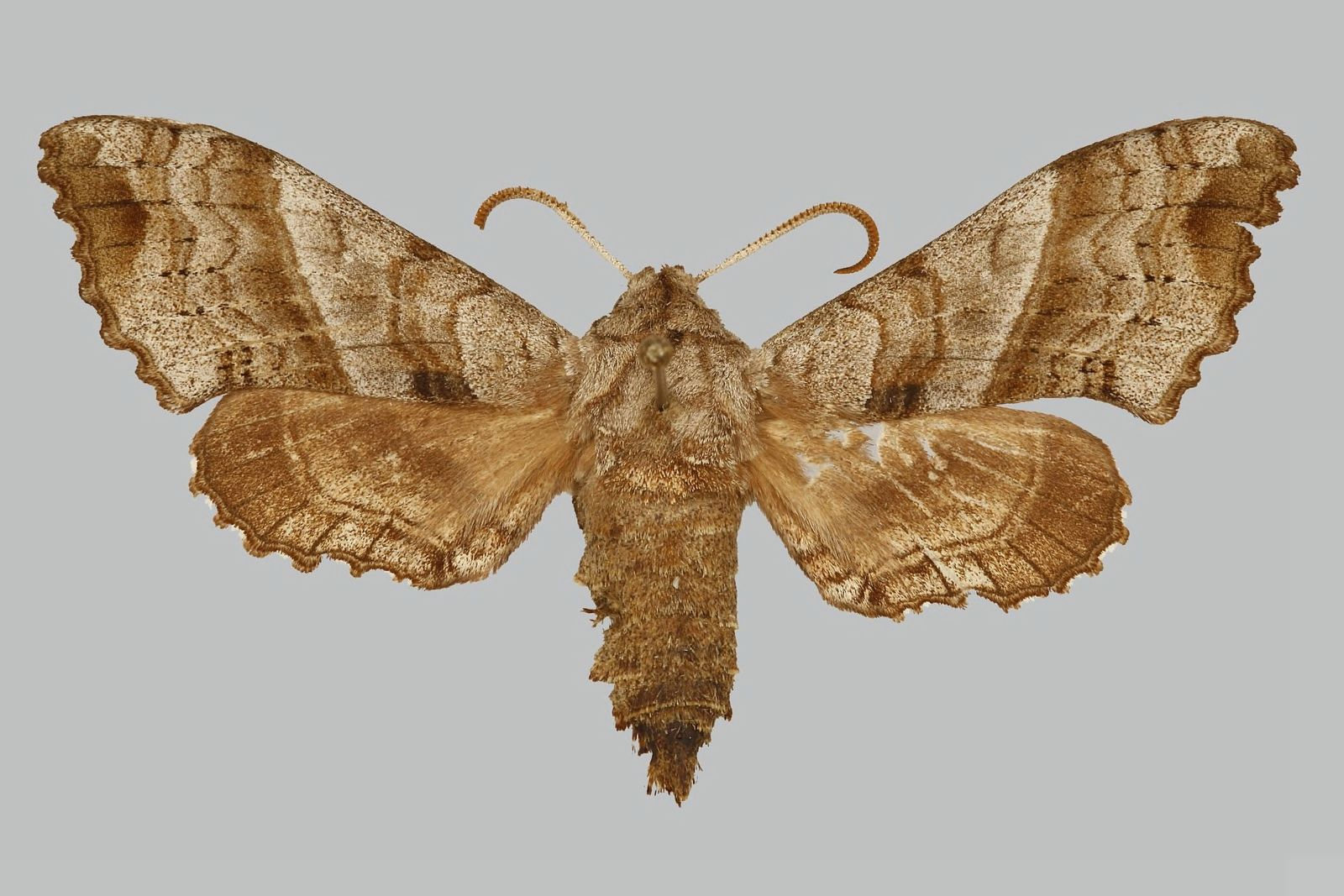

Scientific classification
- Kingdom: Animalia
- Phylum: Arthropoda
- Class: Insecta
- Order: Lepidoptera
- Family: Sphingidae
- Genus: Rufoclanis
- Species: R. erlangeri

Binomial name
- Rufoclanis erlangeri (Rothschild & Jordan, 1903)

Synonyms
- Odontosida erlangeri Rothschild & Jordan, 1903

= Rufoclanis erlangeri =

Species of moth

Rufoclanis erlangeri is a moth of the family Sphingidae. It is known from Somalia, Ethiopia and Kenya.
