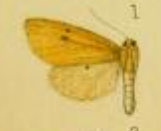

Scientific classification
- Domain: Eukaryota
- Kingdom: Animalia
- Phylum: Arthropoda
- Class: Insecta
- Order: Lepidoptera
- Superfamily: Noctuoidea
- Family: Erebidae
- Subfamily: Arctiinae
- Genus: Spilosoma
- Species: S. mediopunctata

Binomial name
- Spilosoma mediopunctata (Pagenstecher, 1903)

Synonyms
- Amsacta mediopunctata Pagenstecher, 1903; Estigmene mediopunctata Hampson, 1920

= Spilosoma mediopunctata =

Species of moth

Spilosoma mediopunctata is a moth in the family Erebidae. It was described by Arnold Pagenstecher in 1903. It is found in Ethiopia and Somalia.

== Description ==
=== Female ===
Head, thorax, and abdomen orange yellow; antennae black, except basal joint; abdomen with lateral series of black points and two small sublateral spots towards extremity. Forewing pale yellow; a subbasal black point in cell, points in upper and lower angles of cell and two beyond lower angle. Hindwing pale yellow with black discoidal spot.

Wingspan 28 mm.
