= Agriomelissa ursipes =

Scientific classification
- Kingdom: Animalia
- Phylum: Arthropoda
- Class: Insecta
- Order: Lepidoptera
- Family: Sesiidae
- Genus: Agriomelissa
- Species: A. ursipes

Binomial name
- Agriomelissa ursipes (Walker, 1856)

Synonyms
- Melittia ursipes Walker, 1856; Melittia hirtipes Boisduval, 1875

Species of moth

Agriomelissa ursipes is a moth of the family Sesiidae. It is known from Somalia and South Africa.
