= Paralacydes arborifera =

Scientific classification
- Domain: Eukaryota
- Kingdom: Animalia
- Phylum: Arthropoda
- Class: Insecta
- Order: Lepidoptera
- Superfamily: Noctuoidea
- Family: Erebidae
- Subfamily: Arctiinae
- Genus: Paralacydes
- Species: P. arborifera

Binomial name
- Paralacydes arborifera (Butler, 1875)

Synonyms
- Lacydes arborifera Butler, 1875; Lacydes gracilis Butler, 1898; Amsacta impia Strand, 1909; Eutaenia scapulosa Wallengren, 1875; Conchylia smithii Holland, 1897; Caligula wallengreni Aurivillius, 1879

Species of moth

Paralacydes arborifera is a moth of the family Erebidae. It was described by Arthur Gardiner Butler in 1875. It is found in Angola, Botswana, the Democratic Republic of the Congo, Ethiopia, Kenya, Lesotho, Mozambique, Namibia, Somalia, South Africa, Sudan, Tanzania and Zimbabwe.
