= Aethalopteryx tristis =

Scientific classification
- Kingdom: Animalia
- Phylum: Arthropoda
- Class: Insecta
- Order: Lepidoptera
- Family: Cossidae
- Genus: Aethalopteryx
- Species: A. tristis

Binomial name
- Aethalopteryx tristis (Gaede, 1915)

Synonyms
- Hyleutes tristis Gaede, 1915

Species of moth

Aethalopteryx tristis is a moth in the family Cossidae. It is found in Namibia, Kenya and South Africa.
