= Amata chrysozona =

Scientific classification
- Kingdom: Animalia
- Phylum: Arthropoda
- Class: Insecta
- Order: Lepidoptera
- Superfamily: Noctuoidea
- Family: Erebidae
- Subfamily: Arctiinae
- Genus: Amata
- Species: A. chrysozona

Binomial name
- Amata chrysozona (Hampson, 1898)

Synonyms
- Syntomis chrysozona Hampson, 1898

Species of moth

Amata chrysozona is a moth of the subfamily Arctiinae. It was described by George Hampson in 1898. It is found in Rwanda, Somalia, Tanzania and Uganda.
