= Amsactarctia radiosa =

Scientific classification
- Kingdom: Animalia
- Phylum: Arthropoda
- Class: Insecta
- Order: Lepidoptera
- Superfamily: Noctuoidea
- Family: Erebidae
- Subfamily: Arctiinae
- Genus: Amsactarctia
- Species: A. radiosa

Binomial name
- Amsactarctia radiosa (Pagenstecher, 1903)

Synonyms
- Amsacta radiosa Pagenstecher, 1903

Species of moth

Amsactarctia radiosa is a moth of the family Erebidae. It was described by Arnold Pagenstecher in 1903. It can be found in Ethiopia and Somalia.
