= Emilio Berio =

Italian entomologist (1905–1993)

- Born: 13 October 1905; Genoa, Italy
- Died: 28 October 1993 (aged 88); Genoa, Italy
- Occupations: Entomologist, lawyer

Emilio Berio (13 October 1905 – 28 October 1993, Genoa) was an Italian entomologist and lawyer.

He described several new genera and species of moths, mostly Noctuidae.

== Publications ==
- Berio, E. 1935. Nuove Arctiidae d'Africa del Museo di Genova. - Ann. del Museo Civico di Storia Nat. di Genova 59:26-27
- Berio, E. 1935b. Nuove specie di eteroceri Amatidae –Arctiidae –Noctuidae.- Annali Mus. Civ.di Storia Nat. Genova 58:56–65
- Berio, E. 1936a. Specie nuove di lepidotteri della Somalia italiana (Arctiidae; Erastriinae). - Boll. Soc. ent. it. 38(1–2):27–28.
- Berio, E. 1937a. Nuove specie di eteroceri Noctuidae – Lymantriidae – Limacodidae – Geometridae. - Ann. del Museo Civico di Storia Nat. di Genova 58:174–181.
- Berio, E. 1937b. Eteroceri africani apparentemente nuovi. - Ann. del Museo Civico di Storia Nat. di Genova 59:370–393.
- Berio, E. 1938b. Spedizione zoologica del Marchese Saverio Patrizi nel Basso Giuba e nell'Oltregiuba Giugnop-Agosto 1934. Lista dei lepidotteri eteroceri con note e diagnosi di eteroceri africani. - Ann. del Museo Civico di Storia Nat. di Genova 58:189–203.
- Berio, E. 1939a. Contributi alla conoscenza dei lepidotteri eteroceri dell'Eritrea I. - Mem. Soc. Ent. Ital. 17:47–62, pls. 1–2.
- Berio, E. 1939c. Lepidoptera. – In: Missione biologica nel paese dei Borana. Raccolte zoologiche. - — :9–15.
- Berio, E. 1940a. Contributo alla conoscenza dei lepidotteri eteroceri dell'Eritrea III. - Bollettino della Soc. ent. italiana 72(2):21–24.
- Berio, E. 1940b. Lepidotteri raccolti dal col. Mommeret ad Asmara nel Lug.-Ott.1934 con descrizione di une nuova Asticta (Noctuidae). - Boll. Soc. ent. ital. 72(3):42–44
- Berio, E. 1940c. Diagnosi di eteroceri africani. - Mem. Soc. Ent. Ital. 19:125–128.
- Berio, E. 1940d. Contributi per una monografia del genere Ozarba Hb. (Lpe. Noctuidae). - Mem. Soc. Ent. Ital. 19:173–189.
- Berio, E. 1940e. Contributo alla conoscenza dei lepidotteri eteroceri dell'Eritrea V. - Bollettino della Soc. ent. italiana 72(8):122–126.
- Berio, E. 1940f. Contributo alla conoscenza dei lepidotteri eteroceri dell'Eritrea IV. - Mem. Soc. Ent. Ital. 19:190–192
- Berio, E. 1940g. Contributo alla conoscenza dei lepidotteri eteroceri dell'Eritrea VI. Eteroceri raccolti dal cap. Richini ad Adi-Abuna - Boll. Soc. ent. ital. 72(10):161–165.
- Berio, E. 1941b. Contributo alla studio dei lepidotteri eteroceri dell'Eritrea VII. Euchromiidae, Arctiidae, Agaristidae, Lymantriidae, Lasiocampidae, Noctuidae. - Ann. del Museo Civico di Storia Nat. di Genova 61:176–190.
- Berio, E. 1941c. Elenco di lepidotteri eteroceri raccolti da Querci-Romei in Somalia con diagnosi di nuove specie. - Mem. Soc. Ent. Ital. 20:118–124
- Berio, E. 1944. Missione biologica Sagan-Omo diretta dal Prof. E. Zavattari. Lepidoptera Agaristidae e Noctuidae. - Mem. della Società Ent. Italiana 23:74–79.
- Berio, E. 1950a. Terzo contributo alla conoscenza del gen. Ozarba Wlk. (Lep. Noctuidae). - Ann. del Museo Civico di Storia Nat. di Genova 64:131–157.
- Berio, E. 1950b. Diagnosi di nuove specie di nottue (Lepid. Noctuidae = Agrotidae). - Bollettino della Soc. ent. italiana 80(9–10):89–92.
- Berio, E. 1954b. Note sulla sistematica dei generi Achaea Hb. e affini (Lep. Noctuidae). - Bollettino della Soc. ent. italiana 84(1–2):22–24.
- Berio, E. 1954c. Osservazioni su Polydesma umbricola Bdv. e sul genere Polydesma Bdv. (Lep. Noctuidae). - Doriana 1(50):1–8.
- Berio, E. 1954e. Nuove Catocalinae africane al Museo del Congo Belga di Tervuren. - Ann. del Museo Civico di Storia Nat. di Genova 66:336–343
- Berio, E. 1954g. Etude de quelques Noctuidae Erastriinae de Madagascar (Lepid. Noctuidae). - Mém. de l'Institut scientifique de Madagascar (E) 5:133–153; pls. 6, 7.
- Berio, E. 1955c. Osservazioni sul gen. Hypocala e diagnosi di una nuova specie. - Bollettino della Società entomologica italiana 85:84–88
- Berio, E. 1955d. Georyx muscosa Gey. e le specie affini (Lepid. Noct.). - Revue de Zoologie et Botanique Africaines 51(3–4):212–222.
- Berio, E. 1955e. Diagnosi preliminari di Noctuidae africane (Lepidoptera). - Bollettino della Soc. ent. italiana 85(7–8):124–125.
- Berio, E. 1955f. Sulla distribuzione geografica della Noctua algira L. e sulle specie affini (Lep. Noctuidae). - Boll. Soc. ent. ital. 85(9–10):140–148.
- Berio, E. 1956a. Diagnosi preliminari di Noctuidae apparentemente nuove. - Memorie della Società Entomologica Italiana 35:23–34.
- Berio, E. 1956b. Contribution à l'étude des Noctuidae de Madagascar. - Mém. de l'Inst. scientifique de Madagascar (E) 6:109–140.
- Berio, E. 1956d. Eteroceri raccolti dal Dr. Carlo Prola durante la spedizione alle isole dell'Africa orientale con descrizione di specie nuove (Lepidoptera). - Boll. Soc. ent. ital. 86(5–6):82–87.

Berio, E. 1959a. Descrizione di tre specie nuove di Noctuidae provenienti dell'isola di Aldabra e de Nairobi (Kenya). - Bollettino della Società entomologica italiana 89(1–2):11–12.

- Berio, E. 1960a. Descrizione di alcune nuove Noctuidae del Madagascar al Museo di Parigi. - Annali del Mus. civ. di storia naturale Giacomo Doria 71:83:98
- Berio, E. 1960b. Studi sulla sistematica dell cosiddette "Catocalinae" e "Othreinae" (Lep. Noctuidae). Annali Mus. civ. di storia nat. Giacomo Doria 71: 276-327
- Berio, E. 1962a. Diagnosi e sinonumie di Noctuidae dell'Africa centrale (Hadeninae). - Doriana 3(121):1–6.
- Berio, E. 1962b. Diagnosi di alcune Noctuidae delle isole Seicelle e Aldabra. - Annali del Museo Civico di Storia Naturale di Genova 73:172–180.
- Berio, E. 1962c. Diagnosi di alcune specie di Noctuidae africane. - Bollettino della Società entomologica italiana 92(7–8):122– 126.
- Berio, E. 1962d. Descrizione di nuove Noctuidae africane (Euxoinae). - Annali del Museo Civico di Storia Naturale di Genova 73:196–208.
- Berio, E. 1963a. Descrizione di alcune Jaspidiinae Africane del British Museum. - Bollettino della Società entomologica italiana 93(5–6):72–74.
- Berio, E. 1964a. Su alcune spezie del gen. Aspidifrontia Hmps. con descrizione di nuove entità (Lepidoptera-Noctuidae-Hadeninae). - Ann. Museo Civ. di Storia Nat. Giacomo Doria 74:222–232.
- Berio, E. 1964b. Nuovi taxa di Noctuidae Africane. - Bollettino della Società entomologica italiana 94(5–6):87–90.
- Berio, E. 1964d. Nuove specie e nuovo genere di Jaspidiinae del Madagascar, con figure di apparati genitali di Microplexia 'Lepidoptera, Hadeninae). - Boll. Soc. entomologica ital. 94(7–8):120–125.
- Berio, E. 1964g. Osservazione sul gen. Delta Saalm. con descrizione di nuove entità africane (Lepidoptera - Noctuidae). - Doriana 3(144):1–5.
- Berio, E. 1964i. Appunti su alcune specie ascrite al gen. Episparis Wlk. con descrizione di nuovi taxa Africani (Lepidoptera, Noctuidae). - Doriana 4(151):1–5
- Berio, E. 1965a. Le Catocaline Africane a tibie spinose del Museo di Tervuren. - Annali del Museo Civico di Storia Naturale Giacomo Doria 75:181–332.
- Berio, E. 1965b. Sistematica di alcune Noctuidae Africane con descrizione di nuove entità (Lepidoptera). - Bollettino della Società entomologica italiana 95(9–10):144–148.
- Berio, E. 1965c. Afrenella jansei n. gen. n. sp. di Amphipyrinae dell'Africa Centrale (Lepidoptera, Noctuidae). - Mem. Soc. Entomologica Italiana 1965:94.
- Berio, E. 1966a. Reperti di nuove Amphipyrinae dell'Africa Equatoriale con note sinonimiche (Lepidoptera - Noctuidae). - Boll. della Soc. ent. ital. 96(1–2):31–34.
- Berio, E. 1966c. Pandesma muricolor n. sp. e Subpandesma n. gen. (Lepidoptera, Noctuidae). - Boll. della Soc. ent. italiana 96(7–8):139–140.
- Berio, E. 1966e. Descrizione di nuove Noctuidae Africane e note sinonimiche. - Annali del Museo Civico di Storia Naturale di Genova 76:110–136.
- Berio, E. 1969. Nuovo genere e specie di Noctuidae d'Africa. - Bollettino della Società entomologica italiana 99:45–48.
- Berio, E. 1970. Diagnosi di nuove specie esotiche di Noctuidae (Lepidoptera). - Bollettino della Società entomologica italiana 102(1–2):21–29.
- Berio, E. 1971b. Revisione del gen. Polydesma Boisd. E Trichopolydesma Berio (Lepidoptera, Noctuidae). - Ann. Museo Civico di Storia Nat. Genova 78:264-300; pls. 1–2.
- Berio, E. 1972a. Nuove specie e genere di Noctuidae Africane e Asiatiche e note sinonimiche. Parte I. - Mem. della Società Ent. Italiana 51:169–182.
- Berio, E. 1973. Nuove specie e genere di Noctuidae Africane e Asiatiche e note sinonimichi. Parte II. - Ann. del Museo Civico di Storia Nat. di Genova 79:126–171.
- Berio, E. 1974a. Nuove specie e generi di Noctuidae africane e asiatiche e note sinonimiche. Parte III. - Boll. della Società ent. italiana 106(3–4):53–59.
- Berio, E. 1975. Nuove genere e nuove specie di Noctuidae Africane (Lepidoptera). - Ann. del Museo Civico di Storia Nat. di Genova 80(1974):217–225.
- Berio, E. 1976. Nuovi generi e specie di Noctuidae dell'Africa equatoriale (Lepidoptera). - Ann. del Museo Civico di Storia Nat. di Genova 81:96–123.
- Berio, E. 1977b. Diagnosi di nuovi taxa di Noctuidae del globo (Lepidoptera). - Ann. del Museo Civico di Storia Nat. Giacomo Doria 83:321–339.
- Berio, E. 1984. Noctuidae. – In:Rougeot. Missions entomologiques en Ethiopie 1976–1982. - Mém. du Muséum nat. d'Histoire naturelle (A)128:42–48, pl. 3.
- Berio, E. 1985. I nottuidi raccolti in Somalia del Prof. Simonetta nel 1978–79 con descrizione di nuovi taxa. - Contributi faunistici ed ecologici, Univ. di Camerino 1:5–39
- Berio, E. 1985. Fauna d'Italia 22. Lepidoptera: Noctuidae I. Generalità Hadeninae Cucullinae. Ed. Calderini
- Berio, E. 1987. Descrizione di nuove specie di Noctuidae (Lepidoptera) dell Eritrea e del Kenia. - Ann. del Museo Civico di Storia Nat. Giacomo Doria 86:247-250
- Berio, E. 1991. Fauna d'Italia 27. Lepidoptera Noctuidae II. Ed. Calderini
- Berio, E. 1993. Un Genre nouveau et trois Noctuelles nouvelles du Kenya et de Tanzanie. Tropical Lepidoptera, 4(1): 7-12
