= List of moths of Ethiopia =

Location of Ethiopia

The moths of Ethiopia represent about 700 known moth species. The moths (mostly nocturnal) and butterflies (mostly diurnal) together make up the taxonomic order Lepidoptera.

This is a list of moth species which have been recorded in Ethiopia.

== Arctiidae ==
- Acantharctia nigrivena Rothschild, 1935
- Afrasura indecisa (Walker, 1869)
- Afrasura rivulosa (Walker, 1854)
- Afrasura terlinea Durante, 2009
- Alpenus diversata (Hampson, 1916)
- Alpenus geminipuncta (Hampson, 1916)
- Alpenus investigatorum (Karsch, 1898)
- Alpenus nigropunctata (Bethune-Baker, 1908)
- Alpenus schraderi (Rothschild, 1910)
- Amata alicia (Butler, 1876)
- Amata rufina (Oberthür, 1878)
- Amata shoa (Hampson, 1898)
- Amata velatipennis (Walker, 1864)
- Amerila affinis (Rothschild, 1910)
- Amerila bubo (Walker, 1855)
- Amerila niveivitrea (Bartel, 1903)
- Amerila puella (Fabricius, 1793)
- Amerila vidua (Cramer, 1780)
- Amphicallia kostlani Strand, 1911
- Amphicallia solai (Druce, 1907)
- Amsacta melanogastra (Holland, 1897)
- Amsacta nigrisignata Gaede, 1923
- Amsactarctia radiosa (Pagenstecher, 1903)
- Amsactarctia venusta (Toulgoët, 1980)
- Automolis crassa (Felder, 1874)
- Automolis pallida (Hampson, 1901)
- Carcinarctia rougeoti Toulgoët, 1977
- Creatonotos leucanioides Holland, 1893
- Cyana ugandana (Strand, 1912)
- Diota rostrata (Wallengren, 1860)
- Eilema elegans (Butler, 1877)
- Estigmene multivittata Rothschild, 1910
- Euchromia folletii (Guérin-Méneville, 1832)
- Eyralpenus scioana (Oberthür, 1880)
- Galtara doriae (Oberthür, 1880)
- Galtara elongata (Swinhoe, 1907)
- Ischnarctia cinerea (Pagenstecher, 1903)
- Metarctia carmel Kiriakoff, 1957
- Metarctia flavivena Hampson, 1901
- Metarctia fulvia Hampson, 1901
- Metarctia galla Rougeot, 1977
- Metarctia haematricha Hampson, 1905
- Metarctia lateritia Herrich-Schäffer, 1855
- Metarctia negusi Kiriakoff, 1957
- Metarctia noctis Druce, 1910
- Metarctia tenebrosa (Le Cerf, 1922)
- Metarctia unicolor (Oberthür, 1880)
- Micralarctia punctulatum (Wallengren, 1860)
- Nyctemera apicalis (Walker, 1854)
- Nyctemera restrictum (Butler, 1894)
- Ovenna hailesellassiei Birket-Smith, 1965
- Paralacydes minorata (Berio, 1935)
- Paraonagylla zavattarii Berio, 1939
- Radiarctia jacksoni (Rothschild, 1910)
- Secusio strigata Walker, 1854
- Seydelia geometrica (Oberthür, 1883)
- Spilosoma lineata Walker, 1855
- Spilosoma mediopunctata (Pagenstecher, 1903)
- Spilosoma quadrimacula Toulgoët, 1977
- Stenilema aurantiaca Hampson, 1909
- Teracotona abyssinica (Rothschild, 1933)
- Teracotona clara Holland, 1892
- Teracotona jacksoni (Rothschild, 1910)
- Teracotona neumanni Rothschild, 1933
- Teracotona postalbida (Gaede, 1926)
- Teracotona proditrix (Berio, 1939)
- Teracotona pruinosa de Joannis, 1912
- Teracotona seminigra (Hampson, 1905)
- Teracotona subterminata Hampson, 1901
- Thyretes negus Oberthür, 1878
- Utetheisa amhara Jordan, 1939

== Carposinidae ==
- Carposina candace Meyrick, 1932

== Choreutidae ==
- Brenthia leucatoma Meyrick, 1918
- Choreutis argyrastra Meyrick, 1932
- Telosphrantis aethiopica Meyrick, 1932

== Coleophoridae ==
- Blastobasis eridryas Meyrick, 1932
- Blastobasis industria Meyrick, 1913

== Cosmopterigidae ==
- Ascalenia secretifera Meyrick, 1932
- Cosmopterix epismaragda Meyrick, 1932

== Cossidae ==
- Cossus abyssinica Hampson, 1910
- Oreocossus ungemachi Rougeot, 1977

== Crambidae ==
- Ancylolomia perfasciata Hampson, 1919
- Crambus arnaudiae Rougeot, 1977
- Crambus bachi Bassi, 2012
- Crambus boislamberti Rougeot, 1977
- Crambus caligula Błeszyński, 1961
- Crambus dedalus Bassi, 2000
- Crambus descarpentriesi (Rougeot, 1977)
- Crambus diarhabdellus Hampson, 1919
- Crambus jupiter Błeszyński, 1963
- Crambus mesombrellus Hampson, 1919
- Crambus netuncus Bassi, 2012
- Crambus richteri Błeszyński, 1963
- Culladia achroellum (Mabille, 1900)
- Euctenospila castalis Warren, 1892
- Ghesquierellana hirtusalis (Walker, 1859)
- Nomophila noctuella ([Denis & Schiffermüller], 1775)
- Prionapteryx selenalis (Hampson, 1919)
- Pyrausta centralis Maes, 2009
- Syllepte ovialis (Walker, 1859)
- Tegostoma richteri Amsel, 1963
- Tegostoma subterminalis Hampson, 1918
- Udea ferrugalis (Hübner, 1796)

== Elachistidae ==
- Elachista delocharis Meyrick, 1932

== Eupterotidae ==
- Hoplojana abyssinica Rothschild, 1917

== Gelechiidae ==
- Ochrodia subdiminutella (Stainton, 1867)
- Stomopteryx ochrosema Meyrick, 1932

== Geometridae ==
- Aphilopota calaria (Swinhoe, 1904)
- Asthenotricha anisobapta Prout, 1932
- Asthenotricha ansorgei Warren, 1899
- Chiasmia butaria (Swinhoe, 1904)
- Chiasmia dentilineata (Warren, 1899)
- Chiasmia inconspicua (Warren, 1897)
- Chiasmia maculosa (Warren, 1899)
- Chiasmia obliquilineata (Warren, 1899)
- Chiasmia observata (Walker, 1861)
- Chiasmia procidata (Guenée, 1858)
- Chiasmia sororcula (Warren, 1897)
- Chiasmia streniata (Guenée, 1858)
- Chiasmia subcurvaria (Mabille, 1897)
- Chiasmia sufflata (Guenée, 1858)
- Chiasmia umbratilis (Butler, 1875)
- Chiasmia unifilata (Warren, 1899)
- Cleora thyris D. S. Fletcher, 1967
- Coenina aurivena Butler, 1898
- Coenina dentataria Swinhoe, 1904
- Disclisioprocta natalata (Walker, 1862)
- Dithecodes ornithospila (Prout, 1911)
- Drepanogynis nigerrima (Swinhoe, 1904)
- Dysrhoe rhiogyra (Prout, 1932)
- Ecpetala carnifasciata (Warren, 1899)
- Epigynopteryx flavedinaria (Guenée, 1857)
- Epigynopteryx scotti D. S. Fletcher, 1959
- Erastria leucicolor (Butler, 1875)
- Erastria marginata (Swinhoe, 1904)
- Eupithecia angulata D. S. Fletcher, 1951
- Eupithecia devestita (Warren, 1899)
- Eupithecia dilucida (Warren, 1899)
- Eupithecia dinshoensis Herbulot, 1983
- Eupithecia incommoda Herbulot, 1983
- Eupithecia isotenes Prout, 1932
- Eupithecia ochralba Herbulot, 1983
- Eupithecia pseudoabbreviata D. S. Fletcher, 1951
- Eupithecia rigida Swinhoe, 1892
- Eupithecia rougeoti Herbulot, 1983
- Eupithecia rubristigma Prout, 1932
- Eupithecia semipallida Janse, 1933
- Eupithecia urbanata D. S. Fletcher, 1956
- Geodena brunneomarginata Karisch, 2003
- Hemidromodes unicolorata Hausmann, 1996
- Hydrelia candace Prout, 1929
- Hypochrosis chiarinii (Oberthür, 1883)
- Isturgia catalaunaria (Guenée, 1858)
- Isturgia deerraria (Walker, 1861)
- Lhommeia biskraria (Oberthür, 1885)
- Lomographa indularia (Guenée, 1858)
- Mimoclystia deplanata (de Joannis, 1913)
- Mimoclystia pudicata (Walker, 1862)
- Nothofidonia xenoleuca Prout, 1928
- Odontopera integraria Guenée, 1858
- Odontopera protecta Herbulot, 1983
- Omphacodes pulchrifimbria (Warren, 1902)
- Oreometra ras Herbulot, 1983
- Orthonama obstipata (Fabricius, 1794)
- Pachypalpella subalbata (Warren, 1900)
- Piercia zukwalensis Debauche, 1937
- Prasinocyma albivenata Herbulot, 1983
- Prasinocyma germinaria (Guenée, 1858)
- Prasinocyma perpulverata Prout, 1916
- Prasinocyma tranquilla Prout, 1917
- Problepsis neumanni Prout, 1932
- Protosteira spectabilis (Warren, 1899)
- Pseudolarentia megalaria (Guenée, 1858)
- Pseudolarentia monosticta (Butler, 1894)
- Pseudosterrha rufistrigata (Hampson, 1896)
- Rhodometra intervenata Warren, 1902
- Rhodometra plectaria (Guenée, 1858)
- Rougeotiella pseudonoctua Herbulot, 1983
- Scopula erymna Prout, 1928
- Scopula lactaria (Walker, 1861)
- Scopula nemorivagata (Wallengren, 1863)
- Scopula silonaria (Guenée, 1858)
- Scopula simplificata Prout, 1928
- Scotopteryx nictitaria (Herrich-Schäffer, 1855)
- Sesquialtera lonchota Prout, 1931
- Sesquialtera ridicula Prout, 1916
- Somatina pythiaria (Guenée, 1858)
- Tephronia aethiopica Herbulot, 1983
- Traminda neptunaria (Guenée, 1858)
- Trimetopia aetheraria Guenée, 1858
- Xanthorhoe abyssinica Herbulot, 1983
- Xanthorhoe alta Debauche, 1937
- Xanthorhoe cadra (Debauche, 1937)
- Xanthorhoe excelsissima Herbulot, 1977
- Xanthorhoe exorista Prout, 1922
- Xylopteryx raphaelaria (Oberthür, 1880)
- Zamarada calypso Prout, 1926
- Zamarada deceptrix Warren, 1914
- Zamarada delta D. S. Fletcher, 1974
- Zamarada erugata D. S. Fletcher, 1974
- Zamarada excavata Bethune-Baker, 1913
- Zamarada hyalinaria (Guenée, 1857)
- Zamarada melasma D. S. Fletcher, 1974
- Zamarada melpomene Oberthür, 1912
- Zamarada phaeozona Hampson, 1909
- Zamarada secutaria (Guenée, 1858)
- Zamarada torrida D. S. Fletcher, 1974

== Glyphipterigidae ==
- Ussara semicoronis Meyrick, 1932

== Gracillariidae ==
- Acrocercops heteroloba Meyrick, 1932
- Acrocercops orianassa Meyrick, 1932
- Caloptilia macropleura (Meyrick, 1932)
- Corythoxestis aletreuta (Meyrick, 1936)
- Dialectica carcharota (Meyrick, 1912)
- Dialectica ehretiae (Vári, 1961)
- Metacercops hexactis (Meyrick, 1932)
- Metriochroa carissae Vári, 1963
- Metriochroa scotinopa Vári, 1963
- Phyllocnistis citrella Stainton, 1856
- Porphyrosela homotropha Vári, 1963
- Stomphastis heringi Vári, 1963
- Stomphastis horrens (Meyrick, 1932)

== Lasiocampidae ==
- Anadiasa obsoleta (Klug, 1830)
- Beriola anagnostarai (Berio, 1939)
- Braura elgonensis (Kruck, 1940)
- Mallocampa toulgoeti Rougeot, 1977
- Odontocheilopteryx eothina Tams, 1931
- Odontocheilopteryx lajonquieri Rougeot, 1977
- Odontocheilopteryx maculata Aurivillius, 1905
- Odontocheilopteryx myxa Wallengren, 1860
- Pallastica hararia Zolotuhin & Gurkovich, 2009
- Schausinna affinis Aurivillius, 1910
- Sena donaldsoni (Holland, 1901)
- Sena scotti (Tams, 1931)
- Stoermeriana abyssinicum (Aurivillius, 1908)
- Stoermeriana das (Hering, 1928)
- Stoermeriana laportei Rougeot, 1977
- Stoermeriana tamsi Rougeot, 1977
- Stoermeriana viettei Rougeot, 1977
- Streblote badaglioi (Berio, 1937)
- Streblote panda Hübner, 1822
- Theophasida cardinalli (Tams, 1926)

== Limacodidae ==
- Hamartia johanni Rougeot, 1977
- Hamartia medora Hering, 1937

== Lymantriidae ==
- Aroa quadriplagata Pagenstecher, 1903
- Bracharoa reducta Hering, 1926
- Casama impura (Hering, 1926)
- Casama vilis (Walker, 1865)
- Croperoides negrottoi (Berio, 1940)
- Crorema collenettei Hering, 1932
- Dasychira grisea Pagenstecher, 1903
- Euproctis chrysophaea (Walker, 1865)
- Euproctis melalepia Hampson, 1909
- Laelia diascia Hampson, 1905
- Marblepsis flabellaria (Fabricius, 1787)
- Pteredoa atripalpia Hampson, 1910
- Stracilla translucida (Oberthür, 1880)

== Metarbelidae ==
- Aethiopina semicirculata Gaede, 1929
- Salagena fetlaworkae Rougeot, 1977
- Teragra lemairei Rougeot, 1977
- Teragra villiersi Rougeot, 1977

== Noctuidae ==
- Achaea catella Guenée, 1852
- Achaea finita (Guenée, 1852)
- Achaea regularidia (Strand, 1912)
- Acontia akbar Wiltshire, 1985
- Acontia albatrigona Hacker, Legrain & Fibiger, 2008
- Acontia amarei Hacker, Legrain & Fibiger, 2010
- Acontia amhara Hacker, Legrain & Fibiger, 2008
- Acontia antica Walker, 1862
- Acontia apatelia (Swinhoe, 1907)
- Acontia asbenensis (Rothschild, 1921)
- Acontia aurelia Hacker, Legrain & Fibiger, 2008
- Acontia basifera Walker, 1857
- Acontia binominata (Butler, 1892)
- Acontia buchanani (Rothschild, 1921)
- Acontia caeruleopicta Hampson, 1916
- Acontia carnescens (Hampson, 1910)
- Acontia chiaromontei Berio, 1936
- Acontia dichroa (Hampson, 1914)
- Acontia discoidea Hopffer, 1857
- Acontia discoidoides Hacker, Legrain & Fibiger, 2008
- Acontia ectorrida (Hampson, 1916)
- Acontia hampsoni Hacker, Legrain & Fibiger, 2008
- Acontia hemixanthia (Hampson, 1910)
- Acontia homonyma Hacker, Legrain & Fibiger, 2010
- Acontia hoppei Hacker, Legrain & Fibiger, 2008
- Acontia hortensis Swinhoe, 1884
- Acontia imitatrix Wallengren, 1856
- Acontia insocia (Walker, 1857)
- Acontia karachiensis Swinhoe, 1889
- Acontia lanzai (Berio, 1985)
- Acontia melaphora (Hampson, 1910)
- Acontia miogona (Hampson, 1916)
- Acontia natalis (Guenée, 1852)
- Acontia opalinoides Guenée, 1852
- Acontia porphyrea (Butler, 1898)
- Acontia praealba Hacker, Legrain & Fibiger, 2010
- Acontia proesei Hacker, Legrain & Fibiger, 2008
- Acontia purpurata Hacker, Legrain & Fibiger, 2010
- Acontia purpureofacta Hacker, Legrain & Fibiger, 2010
- Acontia robertbecki Hacker, Legrain & Fibiger, 2010
- Acontia ruficincta Hampson, 1910
- Acontia secta Guenée, 1852
- Acontia semialba Hampson, 1910
- Acontia sublactea Hacker, Legrain & Fibiger, 2008
- Acontia szunyoghyi Hacker, Legrain & Fibiger, 2010
- Acontia transfigurata Wallengren, 1856
- Acontia trimaculata Aurivillius, 1879
- Acontia uhlenhuthi Hacker, Legrain & Fibiger, 2008
- Acontia versicolora Hacker, 2010
- Acroriesis ignifusa Hampson, 1916
- Aegleoides paolii Berio, 1937
- Aegocera brevivitta Hampson, 1901
- Aegocera ferrugo Jordan, 1926
- Aegocera rectilinea Boisduval, 1836
- Agrotis cinchonina Guenée, 1852
- Agrotis segetum ([Denis & Schiffermüller], 1775)
- Agrotis separata Guenée, 1852
- Amazonides dubiomeodes Laporte, 1977
- Amazonides koffoleense Laporte, 1977
- Amazonides laheuderiae Laporte, 1984
- Amazonides putrefacta (Guenée, 1852)
- Amazonides zarajakobi Laporte, 1984
- Amphia hepialoides Guenée, 1852
- Amyna axis Guenée, 1852
- Anoba trigonosema (Hampson, 1916)
- Anomis flava (Fabricius, 1775)
- Anomis sabulifera (Guenée, 1852)
- Apospasta claudicans (Guenée, 1852)
- Apospasta sabulosa D. S. Fletcher, 1959
- Ariathisa abyssinia (Guenée, 1852)
- Aspidifrontia ungemachi Laporte, 1978
- Asplenia melanodonta (Hampson, 1896)
- Athetis micra (Hampson, 1902)
- Audea paulumnodosa Kühne, 2005
- Autoba admota (Felder & Rogenhofer, 1874)
- Axylia destefanii Berio, 1944
- Brevipecten hypocornuta Hacker & Fibiger, 2007
- Brevipecten niloticus Wiltshire, 1977
- Brevipecten tessenei Berio, 1939
- Calliodes appollina Guenée, 1852
- Callopistria latreillei (Duponchel, 1827)
- Caradrina atriluna Guenée, 1852
- Caradrina torpens Guenée, 1852
- Catephia albirena Hampson, 1926
- Cerocala confusa Warren, 1913
- Cerocala illustrata Holland, 1897
- Cerocala masaica Hampson, 1913
- Chitasida diplogramma (Hampson, 1905)
- Chrysodeixis acuta (Walker, [1858])
- Clytie sancta (Staudinger, 1900)
- Crambiforma leucostrepta Hampson, 1926
- Crameria amabilis (Drury, 1773)
- Cretonia ethiopica Hampson, 1910
- Crypsotidia woolastoni Rothschild, 1901
- Ctenoplusia fracta (Walker, 1857)
- Ctenoplusia camptogamma (Hampson, 1910)
- Ctenusa curvilinea Hampson, 1913
- Cucullia ennatae (Laporte, 1984)
- Cucullia magdalenae (Laporte, 1976)
- Cucullia simoneuai Laporte, 1976
- Cucullia tedjicolora Laporte, 1977
- Cyligramma latona (Cramer, 1775)
- Cyligramma limacina (Guérin-Méneville, 1832)
- Cyligramma magus (Guérin-Méneville, [1844])
- Digama aganais (Felder, 1874)
- Digama meridionalis Swinhoe, 1907
- Diparopsis watersi (Rothschild, 1901)
- Dysgonia torrida (Guenée, 1852)
- Eublemma bifasciata (Moore, 1881)
- Eublemma costivinata Berio, 1945
- Eublemma debivar Berio, 1947
- Eublemma nyctichroa Hampson, 1910
- Eudocima materna (Linnaeus, 1767)
- Eulocastra zavattarii Berio, 1944
- Eutelia discitriga Walker, 1865
- Eutelia favillatrix (Guenée, 1852)
- Feliniopsis africana (Schaus & Clements, 1893)
- Feliniopsis annosa (Viette, 1963)
- Feliniopsis connivens (Felder & Rogenhofer, 1874)
- Feliniopsis consummata (Walker, 1857)
- Feliniopsis duponti (Laporte, 1974)
- Feliniopsis hosplitoides (Laporte, 1979)
- Feliniopsis insolita Hacker & Fibiger, 2007
- Feliniopsis jinka Hacker, 2010
- Feliniopsis nigribarbata (Hampson, 1908)
- Feliniopsis satellitis (Berio, 1974)
- Feliniopsis talhouki (Wiltshire, 1983)
- Grammodes exclusiva Pagenstecher, 1907
- Grammodes stolida (Fabricius, 1775)
- Hadena bulgeri (Felder & Rogenhofer, 1874)
- Helicoverpa armigera (Hübner, [1808])
- Heliocheilus perdentata (Hampson, 1903)
- Hemituerta mahdi (Pagenstecher, 1903)
- Heraclia superba (Butler, 1875)
- Heraclia viettei Kiriakoff, 1973
- Heteropalpia exarata (Mabille, 1890)
- Heteropalpia robusta Wiltshire, 1988
- Heteropalpia vetusta (Walker, 1865)
- Hiccoda clarae Berio, 1947
- Hypena abyssinialis Guenée, 1854
- Hyposada zavattarii Berio, 1944
- Hypotacha fiorii Berio, 1943
- Hypotacha ochribasalis (Hampson, 1896)
- Iambiodes incerta (Rothschild, 1913)
- Iambiodes postpallida Wiltshire, 1977
- Janseodes melanospila (Guenée, 1852)
- Leucania melianoides Möschler, 1883
- Leumicamia oreias (D. S. Fletcher, 1959)
- Lithacodia blandula (Guenée, 1862)
- Lyncestoides unilinea (Swinhoe, 1885)
- Masalia bimaculata (Moore, 1888)
- Masalia fissifascia (Hampson, 1903)
- Masalia flaviceps (Hampson, 1903)
- Masalia flavistrigata (Hampson, 1903)
- Masalia flavocarnea (Hampson, 1903)
- Masalia galatheae (Wallengren, 1856)
- Masalia hololeuca (Hampson, 1903)
- Masalia latinigra (Hampson, 1907)
- Masalia leucosticta (Hampson, 1902)
- Masalia perstriata (Hampson, 1903)
- Mentaxya ignicollis (Walker, 1857)
- Micraxylia antemedialis Laporte, 1975
- Micraxylia hypericoides Berio, 1963
- Mitrophrys menete (Cramer, 1775)
- Mocis repanda (Fabricius, 1794)
- Neolaphygma leucoplagoides Berio, 1941
- Oedicodia grisescens Berio, 1947
- Oedicodia limbata Butler, 1898
- Oedicodia rubrofusca Berio, 1947
- Oligia adactricula (Guenée, 1852)
- Ophiusa dianaris (Guenée, 1852)
- Oraesia cerne (Fawcett, 1916)
- Oraesia emarginata (Fabricius, 1794)
- Oraesia intrusa (Krüger, 1939)
- Oraesia provocans Walker, [1858]
- Oraesia wintgensi (Strand, 1909)
- Ozarba albimarginata (Hampson, 1896)
- Ozarba boursini Berio, 1940
- Ozarba cryptica Berio, 1940
- Ozarba diaphora Berio, 1937
- Ozarba isocampta Hampson, 1910
- Ozarba lepida Saalmüller, 1891
- Ozarba malaisei Berio, 1940
- Ozarba parvula Berio, 1940
- Ozarba phaea (Hampson, 1902)
- Ozarba pluristriata (Berio, 1937)
- Ozarba punctifascia Le Cerf, 1922
- Ozarba rufula Hampson, 1910
- Ozarba semitorrida Hampson, 1916
- Ozarba terribilis Berio, 1940
- Pandesma anysa Guenée, 1852
- Pandesma muricolor Berio, 1966
- Pericyma metaleuca Hampson, 1913
- Plecoptera melanoscia Hampson, 1926
- Plecopterodes melliflua (Holland, 1897)
- Plecopterodes moderata (Wallengren, 1860)
- Plecopterodes molybdena Berio, 1954
- Pluxilloides hartigi Berio, 1944
- Polydesma umbricola Boisduval, 1833
- Polytela cliens (Felder & Rogenhofer, 1874)
- Pseudomicrodes varia Berio, 1944
- Rhabdophera clathrum (Guenée, 1852)
- Rhesala moestalis (Walker, 1866)
- Rhynchina endoleuca (Hampson, 1916)
- Rhynchina revolutalis (Zeller, 1852)
- Rougeotia abyssinica (Hampson, 1918)
- Rougeotia aethiopica Laporte, 1974
- Rougeotia ludovici Laporte, 1974
- Rougeotia ludovicoides Laporte, 1977
- Rougeotia obscura Laporte, 1974
- Rougeotia roseogrisea Laporte, 1974
- Simplicia extinctalis (Zeller, 1852)
- Sphingomorpha chlorea (Cramer, 1777)
- Spodoptera cilium Guenée, 1852
- Spodoptera exigua (Hübner, 1808)
- Stenosticta grisea Hampson, 1912
- Stenosticta schreieri Hacker, 2010
- Stilbotis berioi Laporte, 1984
- Stilbotis ezanai Laporte, 1984
- Stilbotis fumigera Laporte, 1977
- Stilbotis ungemachi (Laporte, 1984)
- Tathorhynchus leucobasis Bethune-Baker, 1911
- Thiacidas acronictoides (Berio, 1950)
- Thiacidas cerurodes (Hampson, 1916)
- Thiacidas leonie Hacker & Zilli, 2007
- Thiacidas permutata Hacker & Zilli, 2007
- Thiacidas robertbecki Hacker & Zilli, 2007
- Timora zavattarii Berio, 1944
- Tracheplexia richinii Berio, 1973
- Trichoplusia ni (Hübner, [1803])
- Trichoplusia orichalcea (Fabricius, 1775)
- Trigonodes exportata Guenée, 1852
- Trigonodes hyppasia (Cramer, 1779)
- Tycomarptes inferior (Guenée, 1852)
- Tytroca alabuensis Wiltshire, 1970
- Tytroca leucoptera (Hampson, 1896)
- Uollega ungemachi Berio, 1945

== Nolidae ==
- Arcyophora longivalvis Guenée, 1852
- Arcyophora patricula (Hampson, 1902)
- Arcyophora zanderi Felder & Rogenhofer, 1874
- Earias cupreoviridis (Walker, 1862)
- Earias insulana (Boisduval, 1833)
- Leocyma camilla (Druce, 1887)
- Maurilia arcuata (Walker, [1858])
- Meganola reubeni Agassiz, 2009
- Neaxestis mesogonia (Hampson, 1905)
- Negeta luminosa (Walker, 1858)
- Nola pumila Snellen, 1875
- Odontestis striata Hampson, 1912
- Pardoxia graellsii (Feisthamel, 1837)

== Notodontidae ==
- Afroplitis dasychirina (Gaede, 1928)
- Anaphe stellata Guérin-Méneville, 1844
- Antheua birbirana Viette, 1954
- Antheua gaedei Kiriakoff, 1962
- Antheua ochriventris (Strand, 1912)
- Antheua ornata (Walker, 1865)
- Antheua tricolor Walker, 1855
- Antheua trivitta (Hampson, 1910)
- Antistaura decorata Kiriakoff, 1965
- Desmeocraera kiriakoffi Thiaucourt, 1977
- Polelassothys callista Tams, 1930
- Psalisodes saalfeldi Kiriakoff, 1979
- Scalmicauda azebeae Thiaucourt, 1977
- Thaumetopoea apologetica Strand, 1909

== Oecophoridae ==
- Eucleodora chalybeella Walsingham, 1881

== Plutellidae ==
- Lepocnemis metapelista Meyrick, 1932
- Plutella dryoxyla Meyrick, 1932
- Plutella oxylopha Meyrick, 1932
- Plutella stichocentra Meyrick, 1932

== Pterophoridae ==
- Agdistis obstinata Meyrick, 1920
- Amblyptilia direptalis (Walker, 1864)
- Arcoptilia gizan Arenberger, 1985
- Exelastis atomosa (Walsingham, 1885)
- Exelastis phlyctaenias (Meyrick, 1911)
- Hellinsia aethiopicus (Amsel, 1963)
- Hellinsia bigoti (Rougeot, 1983)
- Megalorhipida leucodactylus (Fabricius, 1794)
- Oidaematophorus negus Gibeaux, 1994
- Paracapperia esuriens Meyrick, 1932
- Platyptilia daemonica Meyrick, 1932
- Platyptilia gondarensis Gibeaux, 1994
- Platyptilia implacata Meyrick, 1932
- Platyptilia morophaea Meyrick, 1920
- Platyptilia sabius (Felder & Rogenhofer, 1875)
- Pterophorus candidalis (Walker, 1864)
- Pterophorus lindneri (Amsel, 1963)
- Pterophorus rhyparias (Meyrick, 1908)
- Stenoptilia aethiopica Gibeaux, 1994
- Stenoptilia rougeoti Gibeaux, 1994
- Stenoptilia tyropiesta Meyrick, 1932

== Pyralidae ==
- Endotricha ellisoni Whalley, 1963
- Epicrocis pseudodiscomaculella (Amsel, 1935)
- Harraria rufipicta Hampson, 1930

== Saturniidae ==
- Argema mimosae (Boisduval, 1847)
- Bunaea alcinoe (Stoll, 1780)
- Bunaeopsis birbiri Bouvier, 1930
- Bunaeopsis oubie (Guérin-Méneville, 1849)
- Eosia digennaroi Bouyer, 2008
- Epiphora antinorii (Oberthür, 1880)
- Epiphora bauhiniae (Guérin-Méneville, 1832)
- Epiphora elianae Rougeot, 1973
- Gonimbrasia belina (Westwood, 1849)
- Gonimbrasia ellisoni Lemaire, 1962
- Gonimbrasia fletcheri Rougeot, 1960
- Gonimbrasia fucata Rougeot, 1978
- Gynanisa arba Darge, 2008
- Holocerina digennariana Darge, 2008
- Lobobunaea phaedusa (Drury, 1782)
- Ludia hansali Felder, 1874
- Ludia orinoptena Karsch, 1892
- Nudaurelia fasciata Gaede, 1927
- Nudaurelia staudingeri Aurivillius, 1893
- Nudaurelia ungemachti Bouvier, 1926
- Parusta thelxione Fawcett, 1915
- Pseudaphelia apollinaris (Boisduval, 1847)
- Pseudobunaea heyeri (Weymer, 1896)
- Urota melichari Bouyer, 2008
- Urota sinope (Westwood, 1849)
- Usta terpsichore (Maassen & Weymer, 1885)
- Usta wallengrenii (C. Felder & R. Felder, 1859)
- Yatanga smithi (Holland, 1892)

== Sesiidae ==
- Melittia abyssiniensis Hampson, 1919
- Melittia aethiopica Le Cerf, 1917

== Sphingidae ==
- Agrius convolvuli (Linnaeus, 1758)
- Cephonodes apus (Boisduval, 1833)
- Ceridia heuglini (C. Felder & R. Felder, 1874)
- Chaerocina ellisoni Hayes, 1963
- Chaerocina jordani Berio, 1938
- Dovania neumanni Jordan, 1926
- Falcatula tamsi Carcasson, 1968
- Hippotion celerio (Linnaeus, 1758)
- Hippotion moorei Jordan, 1926
- Hippotion pentagramma (Hampson, 1910)
- Hippotion rebeli Rothschild & Jordan, 1903
- Hippotion roseipennis (Butler, 1882)
- Hippotion socotrensis (Rebel, 1899)
- Hippotion stigma (Rothschild & Jordan, 1903)
- Leucophlebia neumanni Rothschild, 1902
- Leucostrophus alterhirundo d'Abrera, 1987
- Lophostethus negus Jordan, 1926
- Macropoliana natalensis (Butler, 1875)
- Microclanis erlangeri (Rothschild & Jordan, 1903)
- Nephele peneus (Cramer, 1776)
- Nephele vau (Walker, 1856)
- Nephele xylina Rothschild & Jordan, 1910
- Polyptychoides grayii (Walker, 1856)
- Polyptychoides niloticus (Jordan, 1921)
- Pseudoclanis abyssinicus (Lucas, 1857)
- Pseudoclanis bianchii (Oberthür, 1883)
- Temnora pseudopylas (Rothschild, 1894)

== Thyrididae ==
- Arniocera cyanoxantha (Mabille, 1893)
- Arniocera guttulosa Jordan, 1915
- Lamprochrysa amata (Druce, 1910)
- Marmax vicaria (Walker, 1854)
- Netrocera setioides Felder, 1874

== Tineidae ==
- Afrocelestis minuta (Gozmány, 1965)
- Ateliotum convicta (Meyrick, 1932)
- Ceratophaga luridula (Meyrick, 1932)
- Ceratophaga nephelotorna (Meyrick, 1932)
- Ceratophaga tragoptila (Meyrick, 1917)
- Ceratophaga vastellus (Zeller, 1852)
- Cimitra efformata (Gozmány, 1965)
- Cimitra estimata (Gozmány, 1965)
- Criticonoma spinulosa Gozmány, 1965
- Crypsithyris stenovalva (Gozmány, 1965)
- Cylicobathra chionarga Meyrick, 1920
- Dasyses rugosella (Stainton, 1859)
- Dryadaula glycinoma (Meyrick, 1932)
- Ectabola pygmina (Gozmány, 1965)
- Edosa torrifacta (Gozmány, 1965)
- Hapsifera gypsophaea Gozmány, 1965
- Hapsifera ignobilis Meyrick, 1919
- Hapsifera nidicola Meyrick, 1935
- Hapsifera pachypsaltis Gozmány, 1965
- Hapsifera revoluta Meyrick, 1914
- Hapsifera rhodoptila Meyrick, 1920
- Hapsifera richteri Gozmány, 1965
- Hyperbola somphota (Meyrick, 1920)
- Leptozancla zelotica (Meyrick, 1932)
- Monopis addenda Gozmány, 1965
- Monopis leopardina Gozmány, 1965
- Monopis sciagrapha Bradley, 1965
- Monopis speculella (Zeller, 1852)
- Monopis triplacopa Meyrick, 1932
- Myrmecozela isopsamma Meyrick, 1920
- Opogona omoscopa (Meyrick, 1893)
- Perissomastix lucifer Gozmány, 1965
- Perissomastix othello (Meyrick, 1907)
- Perissomastix perdita Gozmány, 1965
- Perissomastix taeniaecornis (Walsingham, 1896)
- Scalmatica separata Gozmány, 1965
- Silosca mariae Gozmány, 1965
- Tinissa spaniastra Meyrick, 1932

== Tortricidae ==
- Capua spilonoma Meyrick, 1932
- Cydia calliglypta (Meyrick, 1932)
- Eccopsis aegidia (Meyrick, 1932)
- Eccopsis maschalista (Meyrick, 1932)
- Eucosma vulpecularis Meyrick, 1932
- Gypsonoma paradelta (Meyrick, 1925)
- Metamesia physetopa (Meyrick, 1932)
- Olethreutes polymorpha (Meyrick, 1932)
- Phtheochroa lonnvei Aarvik, 2010
- Procrica ophiograpta (Meyrick, 1932)
- Tortrix diametrica Meyrick, 1932
- Trachybyrsis chionochlaena Meyrick, 1932

== Yponomeutidae ==
- Yponomeuta ocypora (Meyrick, 1932)

== Zygaenidae ==
- Alteramenelikia jordani (Alberti, 1954)
- Astyloneura bicoloria Röber, 1929
- Epiorna abessynica (Koch, 1865)
- Saliunca anhyalina Alberti, 1957
- Saliunca meruana Aurivillius, 1910
- Saliunca pallida Alberti, 1957
