= List of moths of Djibouti =

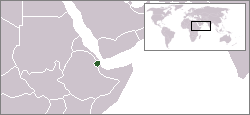
Location of Djibouti

The moths of Djibouti represent about 12 known moth species. Moths (mostly nocturnal) and butterflies (mostly diurnal) together make up the taxonomic order Lepidoptera.

This is a list of moth species which have been recorded in Djibouti.

== Geometridae ==
- Eupithecia dayensis Herbulot, 1983
- Eupithecia urbanata D. S. Fletcher, 1956

== Noctuidae ==
- Acontia dichroa (Hampson, 1914)
- Acontia insocia (Walker, 1857)
- Feliniopsis consummata (Walker, 1857)
- Honeyia clearchus (Fawcett, 1916)
- Odontoretha gigas Laporte, 1984
- Stenosticta coppensi Laporte, 1977

== Saturniidae ==
- Gynanisa jama Rebel, 1915
- Holocerina menieri Rougeot, 1973
- Holocerina smilax (Westwood, 1849)

== Sphingidae ==
- Macropoliana afarorum Rougeot, 1975
