= Trisula variegata =

Scientific classification
- Domain: Eukaryota
- Kingdom: Animalia
- Phylum: Arthropoda
- Class: Insecta
- Order: Lepidoptera
- Superfamily: Noctuoidea
- Family: Noctuidae
- Genus: Thiacidas
- Species: T. variegata

Binomial name
- Thiacidas variegata Moore, 1858

Synonyms
- Thiacidas variegata Moore, 1858

Species of moth

Trisula variegata is a moth of the family Noctuidae first described by Frederic Moore in 1858. It is found in India, Sri Lanka, Nepal, Thailand, South China, Indonesia and the Philippines.

Its head is golden fulvous with black sprinkles. Palpi upturned. Antennae ciliated (hairy) in both sexes. Thorax brown, with fuscous sprinkles. Forewing pale, and variegated with suffuse and fuscous. There are indistinct double waved subbasal and antemedial lines. Reniform spot indistinct. An oblique black band runs across the apical area. Marginal series of dark specks. Hindwings are yellowish white, with a large black spot at and of cell. Abdomen pale. Underside whitish with cell spots in both wings.
