= Usta biplaga =

Scientific classification
- Domain: Eukaryota
- Kingdom: Animalia
- Phylum: Arthropoda
- Class: Insecta
- Order: Lepidoptera
- Family: Saturniidae
- Genus: Usta
- Species: U. biplaga

Binomial name
- Usta biplaga Rebel, 1912

Species of moth

Usta biplaga is a species of moth in the family Saturniidae. It is found in south-western Africa.

== Taxonomy ==
Usta biplaga is treated as a subspecies, form or synonym of Usta wallengrenii by some sources.
