= Usta subangulata =

Scientific classification
- Kingdom: Animalia
- Phylum: Arthropoda
- Class: Insecta
- Order: Lepidoptera
- Family: Saturniidae
- Genus: Usta
- Species: U. subangulata

Binomial name
- Usta subangulata Bouvier, 1930

Species of moth

Usta subangulata is a species of moth in the family Saturniidae. It is found in Tanzania, Kenya, the Democratic Republic of the Congo, Mozambique, Malawi, Ethiopia, Uganda and Zambia.

== Taxonomy ==
Usta subangulata is treated as a subspecies of Usta terpsichore by some sources. Furthermore, Usta grantae is either treated as a full species, a subspecies or synonym of Usta subangulata or a subspecies of Usta terpsichore.
