= Dovania dargei =

Scientific classification
- Domain: Eukaryota
- Kingdom: Animalia
- Phylum: Arthropoda
- Class: Insecta
- Order: Lepidoptera
- Family: Sphingidae
- Genus: Dovania
- Species: D. dargei

Binomial name
- Dovania dargei Pierre, 2000

Species of moth

Dovania dargei is a moth of the family Sphingidae. It is known from Ethiopia.
