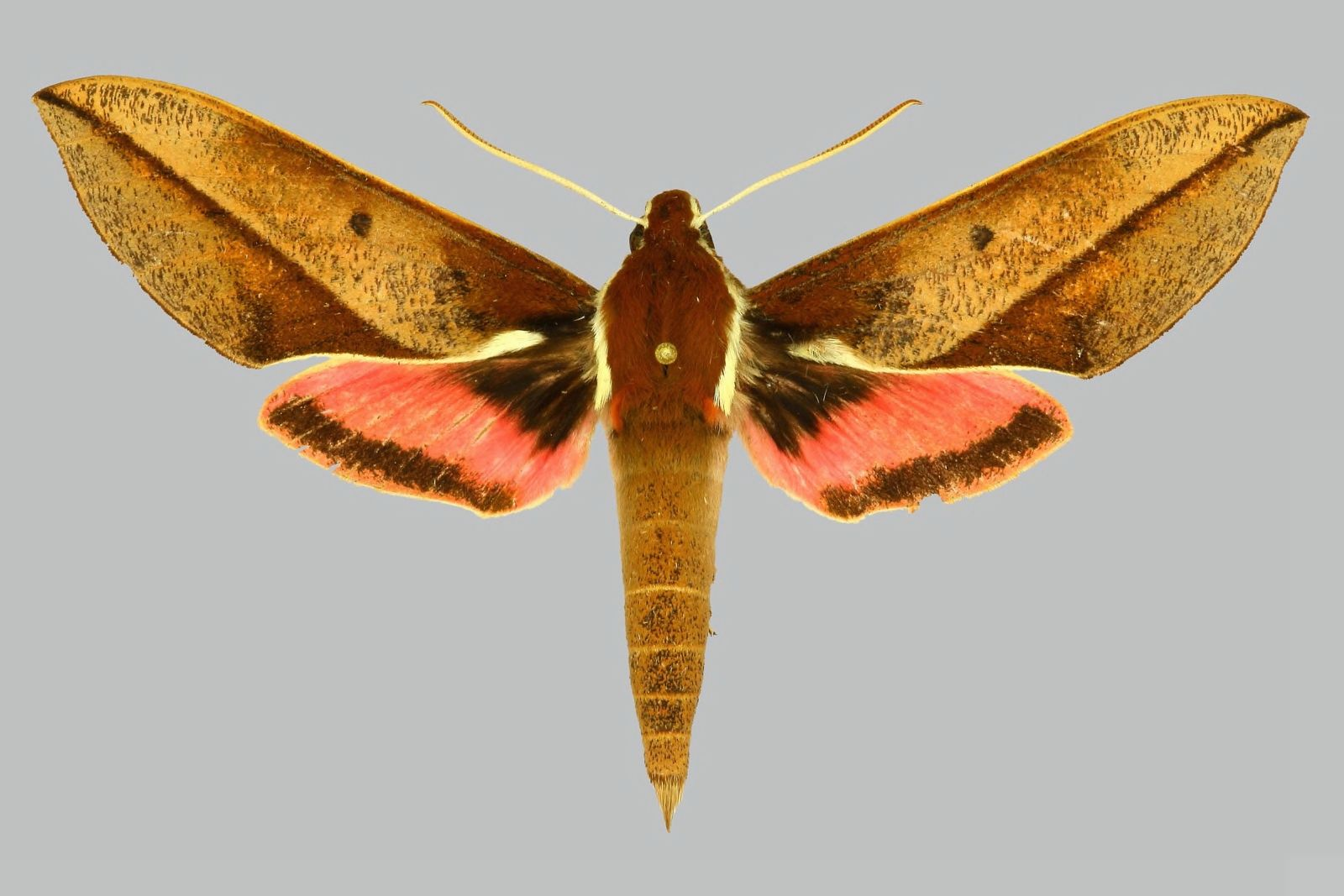
- Male

Scientific classification
- Domain: Eukaryota
- Kingdom: Animalia
- Phylum: Arthropoda
- Class: Insecta
- Order: Lepidoptera
- Family: Sphingidae
- Genus: Chaerocina
- Species: C. zomba

Binomial name
- Chaerocina zomba Darge, 2006

= Chaerocina zomba =

Species of moth

Chaerocina zomba is a moth of the family Sphingidae that is endemic to Malawi.
