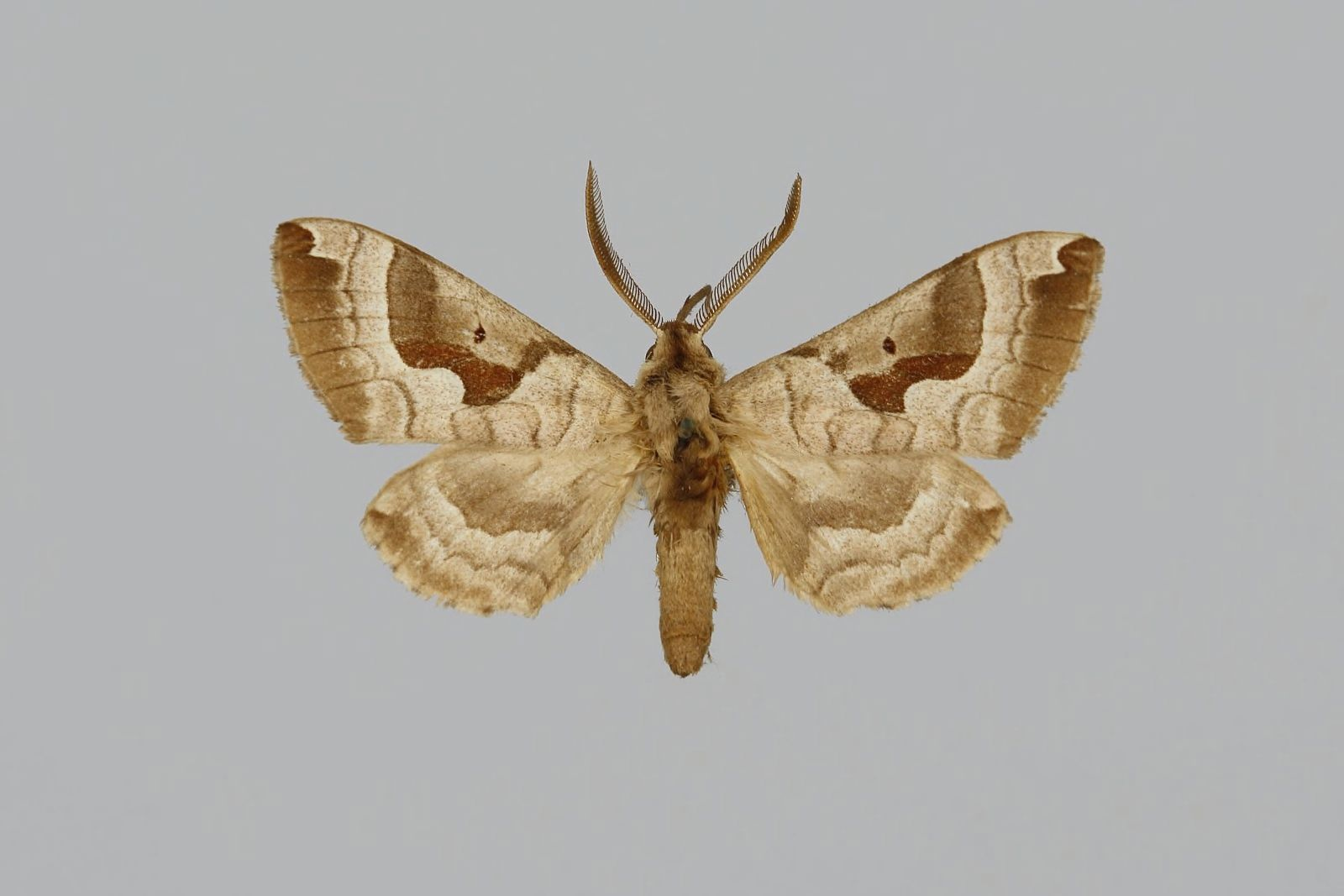
- Male

Scientific classification
- Domain: Eukaryota
- Kingdom: Animalia
- Phylum: Arthropoda
- Class: Insecta
- Order: Lepidoptera
- Family: Sphingidae
- Genus: Ceridia
- Species: C. mira

Binomial name
- Ceridia mira Rothschild & Jordan, 1903

= Ceridia mira =

Species of moth

Ceridia mira is a moth of the family Sphingidae. It is known from dry bush in eastern and northern Kenya.
