= Carcinarctia metamelaena =

Scientific classification
- Kingdom: Animalia
- Phylum: Arthropoda
- Class: Insecta
- Order: Lepidoptera
- Superfamily: Noctuoidea
- Family: Erebidae
- Subfamily: Arctiinae
- Genus: Carcinarctia
- Species: C. metamelaena

Binomial name
- Carcinarctia metamelaena Hampson, 1901

Species of moth

Carcinarctia metamelaena is a moth of the family Erebidae. It was described by George Hampson in 1901. It is found in Kenya.
