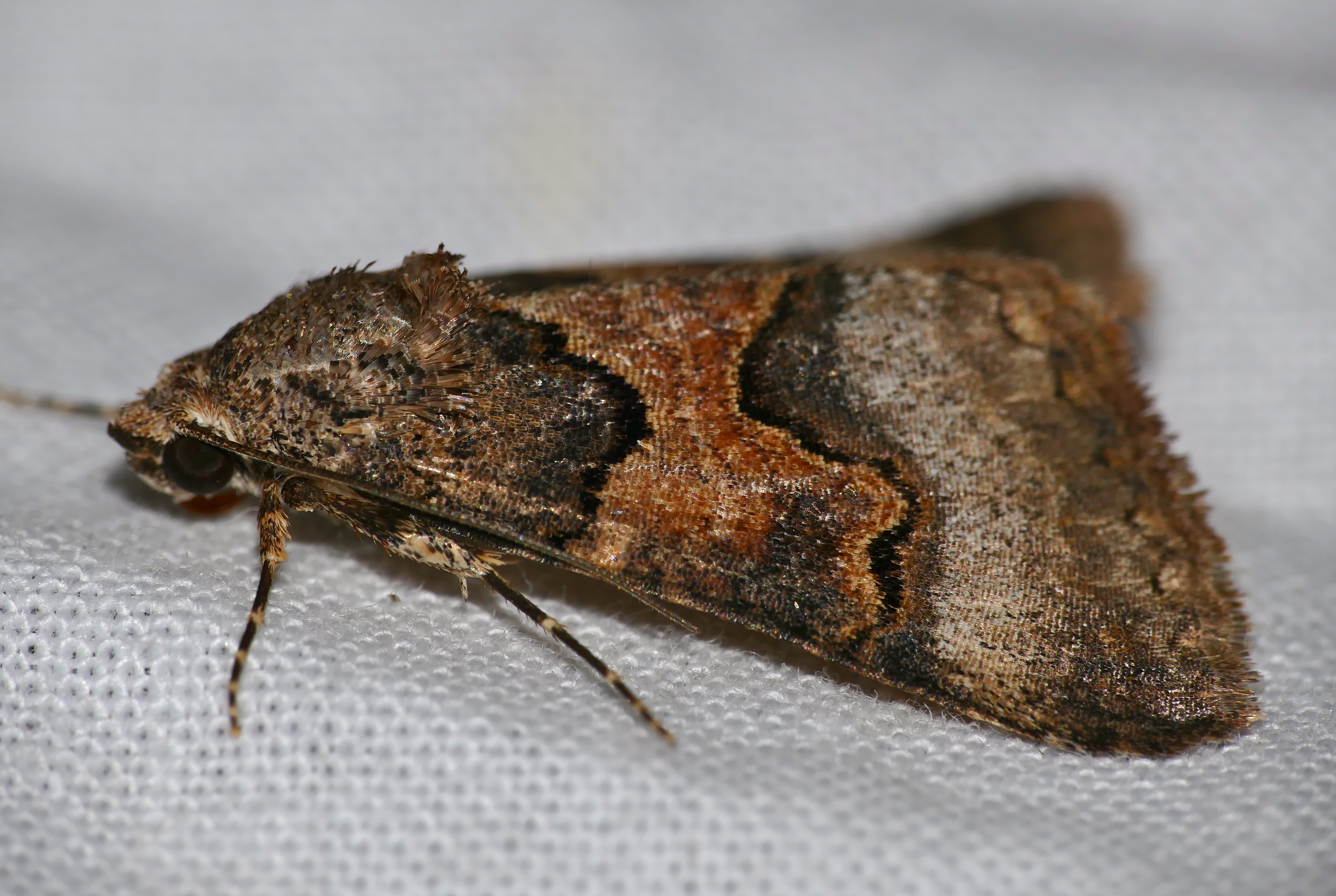

Scientific classification
- Kingdom: Animalia
- Phylum: Arthropoda
- Class: Insecta
- Order: Lepidoptera
- Superfamily: Noctuoidea
- Family: Erebidae
- Genus: Tytroca
- Species: T. metaxantha

Binomial name
- Tytroca metaxantha (Hampson, 1902)

Synonyms
- Chalciope metaxantha Hampson, 1902

= Tytroca metaxantha =

Species of moth

Tytroca metaxantha is a moth of the family Erebidae first described by George Hampson in 1902. It is found in South Africa and Zimbabwe.
