= Kenyarctia occidentalis =

Scientific classification
- Domain: Eukaryota
- Kingdom: Animalia
- Phylum: Arthropoda
- Class: Insecta
- Order: Lepidoptera
- Superfamily: Noctuoidea
- Family: Erebidae
- Subfamily: Arctiinae
- Genus: Kenyarctia
- Species: K. occidentalis

Binomial name
- Kenyarctia occidentalis (Bartel, 1903)

Synonyms
- Spilosoma occidentalis Bartel, 1903

Species of moth

Kenyarctia occidentalis is a moth in the family Erebidae. It was described by Max Bartel in 1903. It is found in Namibia and South Africa.
