= Tytroca =

Scientific classification
- Kingdom: Animalia
- Phylum: Arthropoda
- Class: Insecta
- Order: Lepidoptera
- Superfamily: Noctuoidea
- Family: Erebidae
- Subfamily: Erebinae
- Tribe: Ophiusini
- Genus: Tytroca; Wiltshire, 1970

Genus of moths

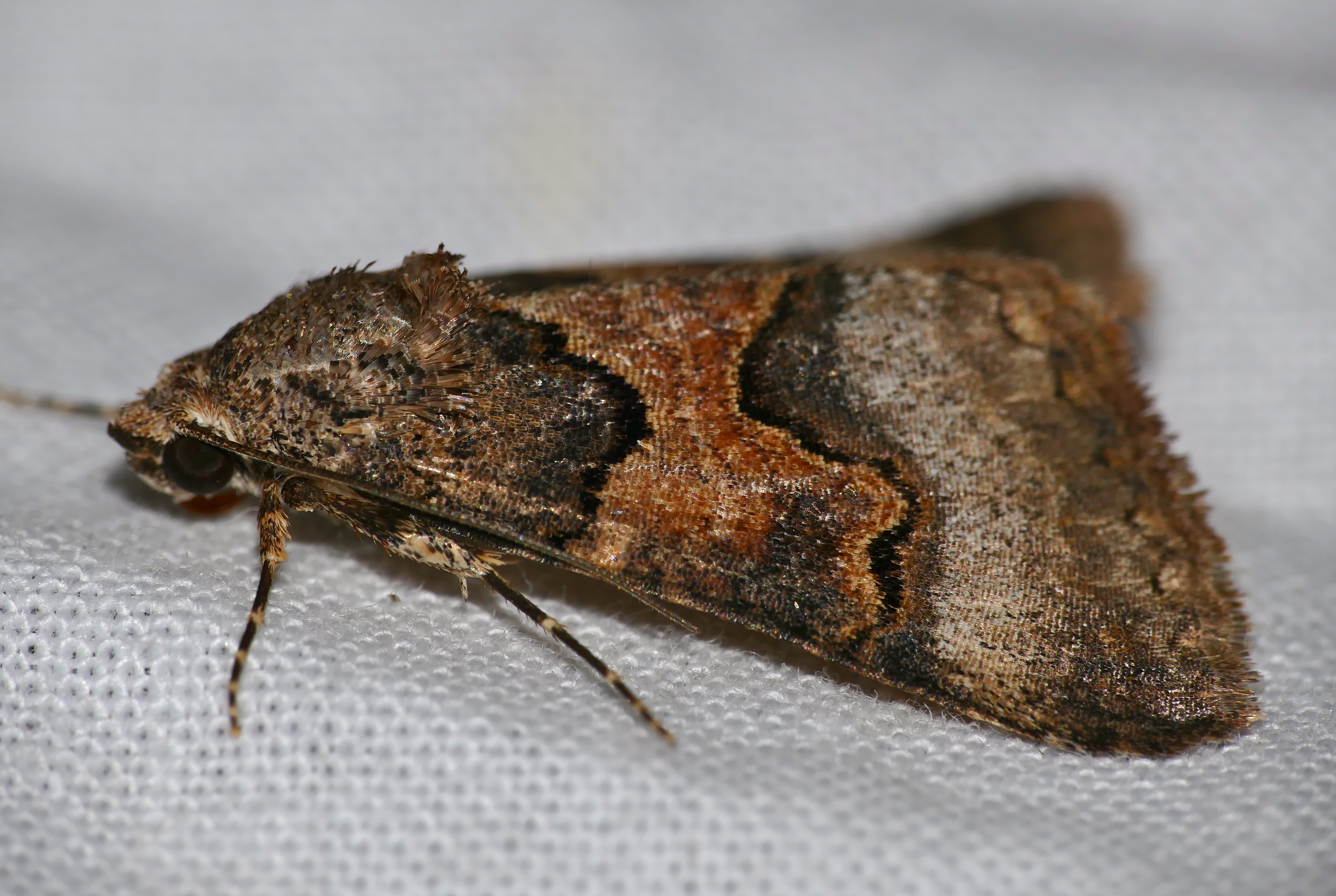
Tytroca metaxantha in the Eastern Cape, South Africa. (Photo by Bernard Dupont)

Tytroca is a genus of moths in the family Erebidae.

== Species ==
- Tytroca alabuensis Wiltshire, 1970
- Tytroca dispar (Püngeler, 1904)
- Tytroca fasciolata Warren and Rothschild, 1905
- Tytroca leucoptera (Hampson, 1896)
- Tytroca metaxantha (Hampson, 1902)
