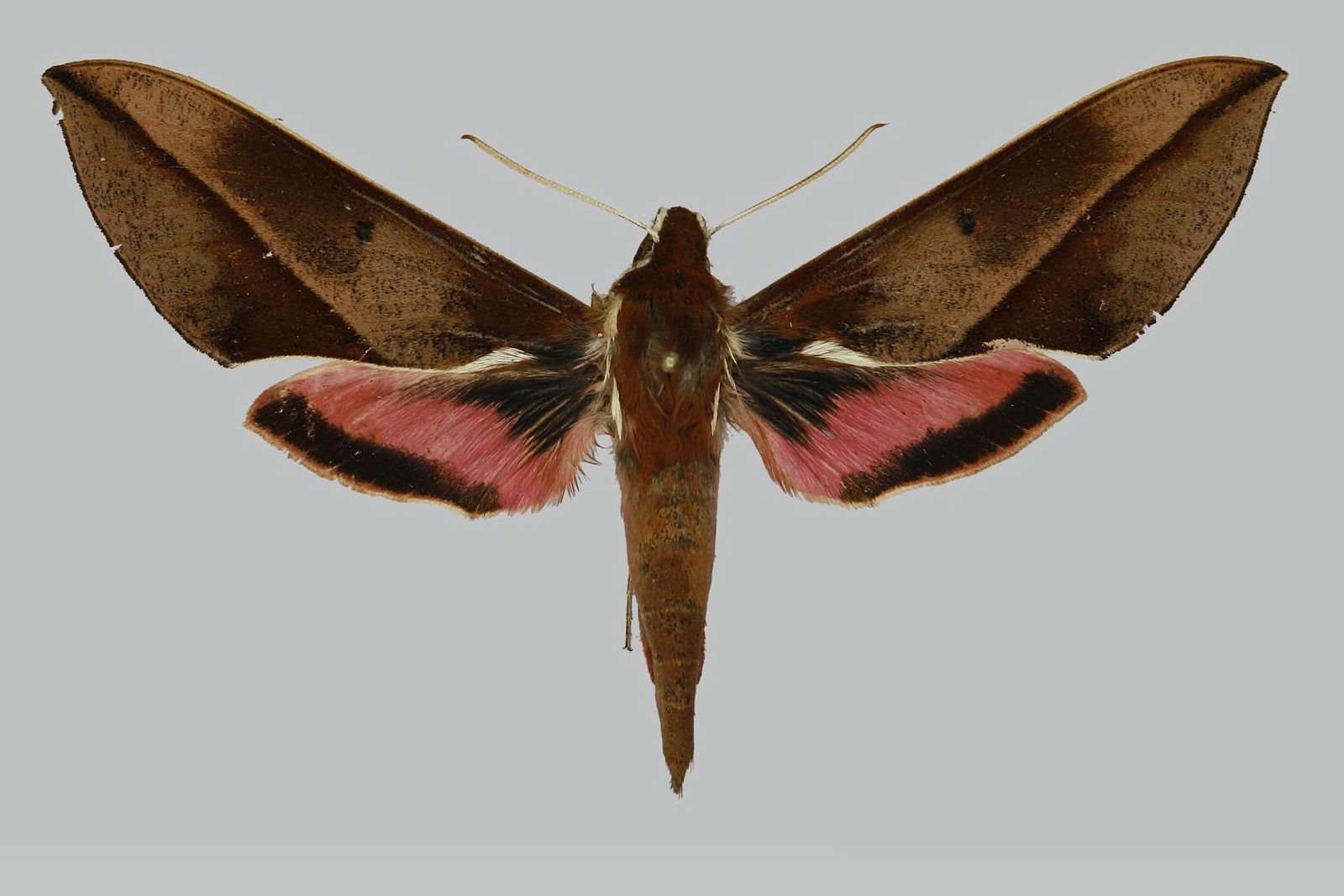
- Chaerocina meridionalis

Scientific classification
- Domain: Eukaryota
- Kingdom: Animalia
- Phylum: Arthropoda
- Class: Insecta
- Order: Lepidoptera
- Family: Sphingidae
- Subtribe: Choerocampina
- Genus: Chaerocina; Rothschild & Jordan, 1903

Species
- See text

= Chaerocina =

Genus of moths

Chaerocina is a genus of moths in the family Sphingidae. The genus was erected by Walter Rothschild and Karl Jordan in 1903.

== Species ==
- Chaerocina dohertyi Rothschild & Jordan 1903
- Chaerocina ellisoni Hayes 1963
- Chaerocina jordani Berio 1938
- Chaerocina livingstonensis Darge, 2006
- Chaerocina mbiziensis Darge & Basquin, 2008
- Chaerocina meridionalis Carcasson, 1968
- Chaerocina nyikiana Darge & Basquin, 2008
- Chaerocina usambarensis Darge & Basquin, 2008
- Chaerocina zomba Darge, 2006
