= Carcinarctia laeliodes =

Scientific classification
- Kingdom: Animalia
- Phylum: Arthropoda
- Class: Insecta
- Order: Lepidoptera
- Superfamily: Noctuoidea
- Family: Erebidae
- Subfamily: Arctiinae
- Genus: Carcinarctia
- Species: C. laeliodes

Binomial name
- Carcinarctia laeliodes Hampson, 1916

Synonyms
- Carcinarctia laeliodes f. clarissima Gaede, 1926

Species of moth

Carcinarctia laeliodes is a moth of the family Erebidae. It was described by George Hampson in 1916. It is found in the Democratic Republic of the Congo, Kenya and Rwanda.

== Subspecies ==
- Carcinarctia laeliodes laeliodes
- Carcinarctia laeliodes fasciata Debauche, 1942 (Democratic Republic of the Congo)
