= Usta alba =

Scientific classification
- Kingdom: Animalia
- Phylum: Arthropoda
- Class: Insecta
- Order: Lepidoptera
- Family: Saturniidae
- Genus: Usta
- Species: U. alba

Binomial name
- Usta alba Terral & Lequeux, 1991

Species of moth

Usta alba is a species of moth in the family Saturniidae. It is found in Tanzania.

== Taxonomy ==
Usta alba is treated as a subspecies or synonym of Usta terpsichore by some sources.
