= Agriomelissa brevicornis =

Scientific classification
- Kingdom: Animalia
- Phylum: Arthropoda
- Class: Insecta
- Order: Lepidoptera
- Family: Sesiidae
- Genus: Agriomelissa
- Species: A. brevicornis

Binomial name
- Agriomelissa brevicornis (Aurivillius, 1905)

Synonyms
- Melittia brevicornis Aurivillius, 1905

Species of moth

Agriomelissa brevicornis is a moth of the family Sesiidae. It is known from Cameroon.
