= Agriomelissa =

Scientific classification
- Kingdom: Animalia
- Phylum: Arthropoda
- Class: Insecta
- Order: Lepidoptera
- Family: Sesiidae
- Tribe: Melittiini
- Genus: Agriomelissa; Meyrick, 1931

Species
- See text

Genus of moths

Agriomelissa is a genus of moths in the family Sesiidae.

== Species ==
- Agriomelissa aethiopica (Le Cerf, 1917)
- Agriomelissa amblyphaea (Hampson, 1919)
- Agriomelissa brevicornis (Aurivillius, 1905)
- Agriomelissa gypsospora Meyrick, 1931
- Agriomelissa malagasy (Viette, 1982)
- Agriomelissa ursipes (Walker, 1856)
- Agriomelissa victrix (Le Cerf, 1916)
