= Kenyarctia epicaste =

Scientific classification
- Domain: Eukaryota
- Kingdom: Animalia
- Phylum: Arthropoda
- Class: Insecta
- Order: Lepidoptera
- Superfamily: Noctuoidea
- Family: Erebidae
- Subfamily: Arctiinae
- Genus: Kenyarctia
- Species: K. epicaste

Binomial name
- Kenyarctia epicaste (Fawcett, 1915)

Synonyms
- Diacrisia epicaste Fawcett, 1915

Species of moth

Kenyarctia epicaste is a moth in the family Erebidae. It was described by James Farish Malcolm Fawcett in 1915. It is found in Kenya.
