= Tytroca dispar =

Scientific classification
- Domain: Eukaryota
- Kingdom: Animalia
- Phylum: Arthropoda
- Class: Insecta
- Order: Lepidoptera
- Superfamily: Noctuoidea
- Family: Erebidae
- Genus: Tytroca
- Species: T. dispar

Binomial name
- Tytroca dispar (Püngeler, 1904)

Synonyms
- Pericyma dispar; Cortyta dallonii; Cortyta sabulifera; Cortyta dispar margarita; Tytroca dispar puengeleri

Species of moth

Tytroca dispar is a moth of the family Noctuidae first described by Rudolf Püngeler in 1904. It is found in semi-deserts and deserts from the Sahara, the Arabian Peninsula, Israel, Jordan and the Sinai.

The female adult of this species has a wingspan of 27 mm.

There are multiple generations per year. Adults are on wing year round.

The larvae feed on Acacia species.
