= Carcinarctia =

Scientific classification
- Kingdom: Animalia
- Phylum: Arthropoda
- Class: Insecta
- Order: Lepidoptera
- Superfamily: Noctuoidea
- Family: Erebidae
- Subfamily: Arctiinae
- Subtribe: Spilosomina
- Genus: Carcinarctia; Hampson, 1901

Type species
- Carcinarctia metamelaena Hampson, 1901

Genus of moths

Carcinarctia is a genus of tiger moths in the family Erebidae. The genus was erected by George Hampson in 1901 and they are found in the Afrotropics.

== Species ==
- Carcinarctia kivuensis Joicey & Talbot, 1924
- Carcinarctia laeliodes Hampson, 1916
  - Carcinarctia laeliodes fasciata Debauche, 1942
- Carcinarctia metamelaena Hampson, 1901
- Carcinarctia rougeoti Toulgoët, 1977
- Carcinarctia rufa (Joicey & Talbot, 1921)
