= Tytroca fasciolata =

Scientific classification
- Domain: Eukaryota
- Kingdom: Animalia
- Phylum: Arthropoda
- Class: Insecta
- Order: Lepidoptera
- Superfamily: Noctuoidea
- Family: Erebidae
- Genus: Tytroca
- Species: T. fasciolata

Binomial name
- Tytroca fasciolata Warren & Rothschild, 1905

Synonyms
- Pericyma fasciolata; Homoptera eremochroa; Cortyta impar; Tytroca impar; Cortyta fasciolata subsimilis

Species of moth

Tytroca fasciolata is a moth of the family Noctuidae first described by William Warren and Walter Rothschild in 1905. It is found from Africa, (including Algeria, Chad, Egypt, Kenya, Mauritania, Oman, Saudi Arabia, Sudan, Saudi Arabia, Yemen), through the Arabian Peninsula (including the United Arab Emirates) to India.
