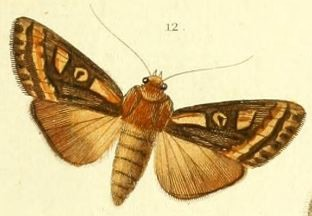

Scientific classification
- Kingdom: Animalia
- Phylum: Arthropoda
- Clade: Pancrustacea
- Class: Insecta
- Order: Lepidoptera
- Superfamily: Noctuoidea
- Family: Noctuidae
- Subfamily: Acronictinae
- Genus: Amphia; Guenee, 1852

= Amphia =

Genus of moths

Amphia is a genus of moths of the family Noctuidae. Also the name of a small garage band

== Species ==
- Amphia gigantea Viette, 1958
- Amphia hepialoides Guenee, 1852
- Amphia sogai Viette, 1967
- Amphia subunita Guenee, 1852
- Amphia voeltzkowi Viette, 1979
