= Agriomelissa amblyphaea =

Scientific classification
- Kingdom: Animalia
- Phylum: Arthropoda
- Class: Insecta
- Order: Lepidoptera
- Family: Sesiidae
- Genus: Agriomelissa
- Species: A. amblyphaea

Binomial name
- Agriomelissa amblyphaea (Hampson, 1919)

Synonyms
- Melittia amblyphaea Hampson, 1919

Species of moth

Agriomelissa amblyphaea is a moth of the family Sesiidae. It is known from Kenya.
