= Dovania mirei =

Scientific classification
- Domain: Eukaryota
- Kingdom: Animalia
- Phylum: Arthropoda
- Class: Insecta
- Order: Lepidoptera
- Family: Sphingidae
- Genus: Dovania
- Species: D. mirei

Binomial name
- Dovania mirei Pierre, 2000

Species of moth

Dovania mirei is a moth of the family Sphingidae. It is known from Nigeria.
