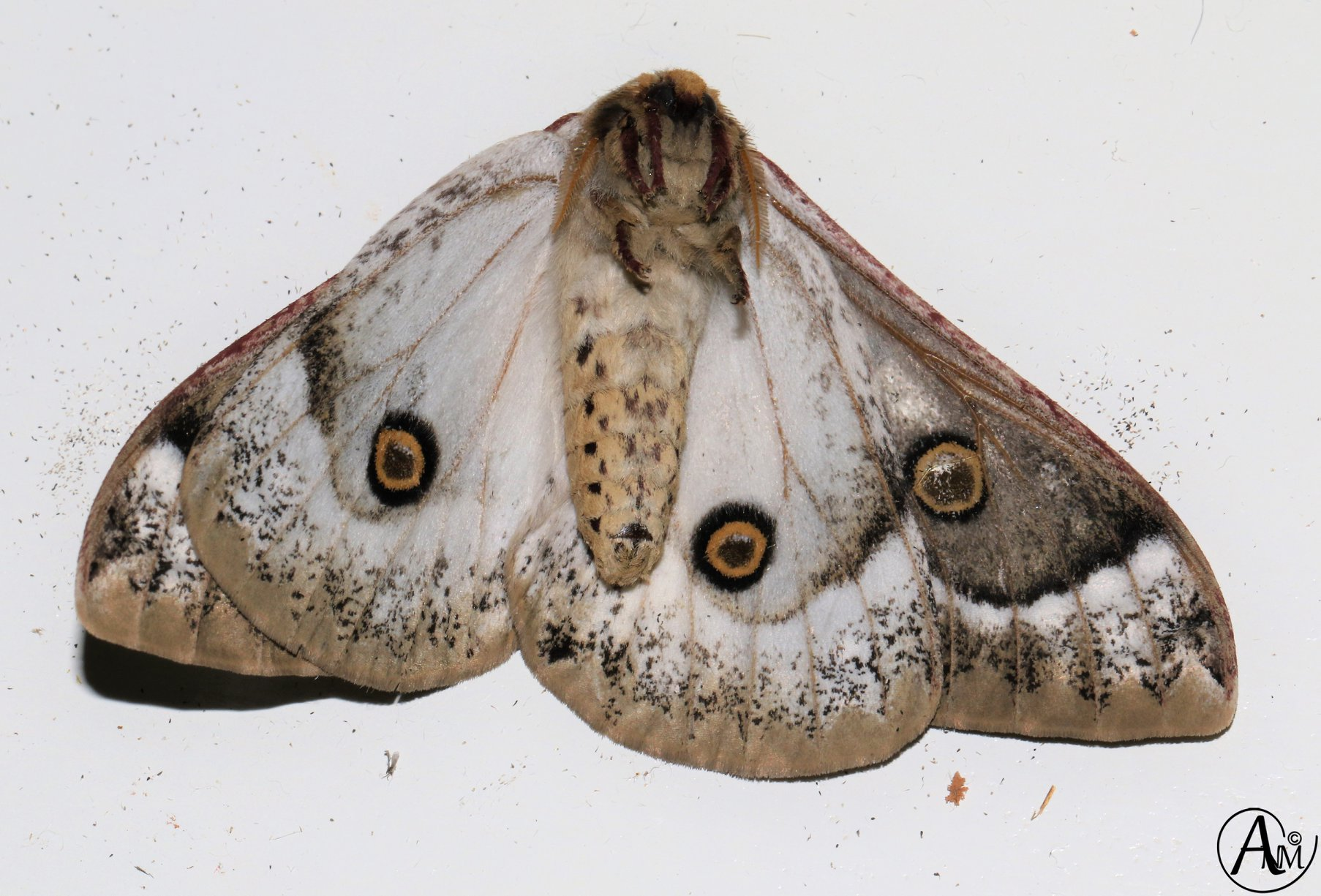
- Usta terpsichore

Scientific classification
- Domain: Eukaryota
- Kingdom: Animalia
- Phylum: Arthropoda
- Class: Insecta
- Order: Lepidoptera
- Family: Saturniidae
- Genus: Usta
- Species: U. terpsichore

Binomial name
- Usta terpsichore (Maassen & Weymer, 1885)

Synonyms
- Saturnia terpsichore Maassen & Weymer, 1885; Heniocha abyssinica Aurivillius, 1898; Usta yaere Darge, 1994

= Usta terpsichore =

Species of moth

Usta terpsichore, the cavorting emperor, is a species of moth in the family Saturniidae. It is found in Angola, Burkina Faso, Eritrea, Ethiopia, Malawi, Mozambique, South Africa, Tanzania, Zambia and Zimbabwe.

The larvae feed on Commiphora caryaefolia, Sclerocarya afra, Melia azedarach and Schinus molle. Fully grown larvae are about 80 mm long.

The larvae are used as food by locals. They are rich in iron, copper, zinc, thiamine and riboflavin. It is also relatively high in calcium and phosphorus compared to many insects.

== Subspecies ==
Some sources list a number of subspecies, while others treat most of these as full species and/or synonyms:

- Usta terpsichore subangulata Bouvier, 1930 (mostly treated as a full species)
- Usta terpsichore grantae Terral & Lequeux, 1991 (mostly treated as a full species)
- Usta terpsichore alba Terral & Lequeux, 1991 (mostly treated as a full species)
- Usta terpsichore abyssinica (Aurivillius, 1898) (mostly treated as a synonym)
- Usta terpsichore yaere Darge, 1994 (mostly treated as a synonym)
