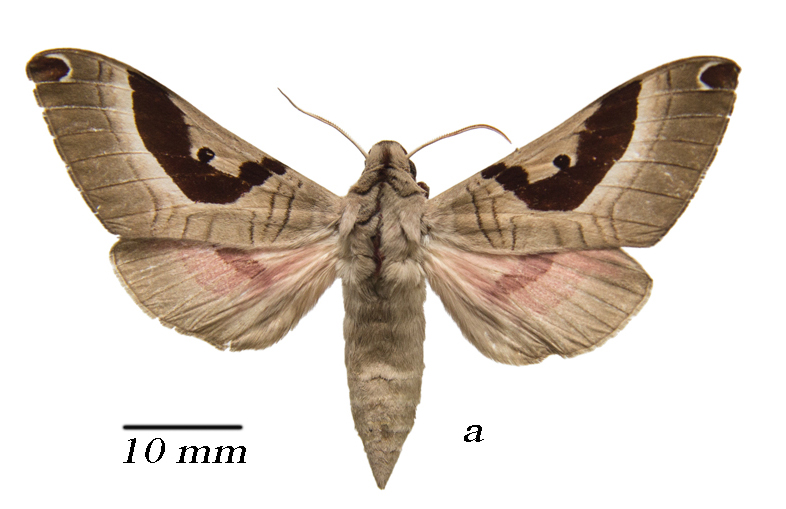
- Ceridia agilei agilei holotype, male upperside.

Scientific classification
- Kingdom: Animalia
- Phylum: Arthropoda
- Class: Insecta
- Order: Lepidoptera
- Family: Sphingidae
- Tribe: Smerinthini
- Genus: Ceridia; Rothschild & Jordan, 1903

= Ceridia =

Genus of moths

Ceridia is a genus of moths in the family Sphingidae. The genus was erected by Walter Rothschild and Karl Jordan in 1903.

== Species ==
- Ceridia heuglini (R. Felder 1874)
- Ceridia mira Rothschild & Jordan 1903
- Ceridia nigricans Griveaud 1959
