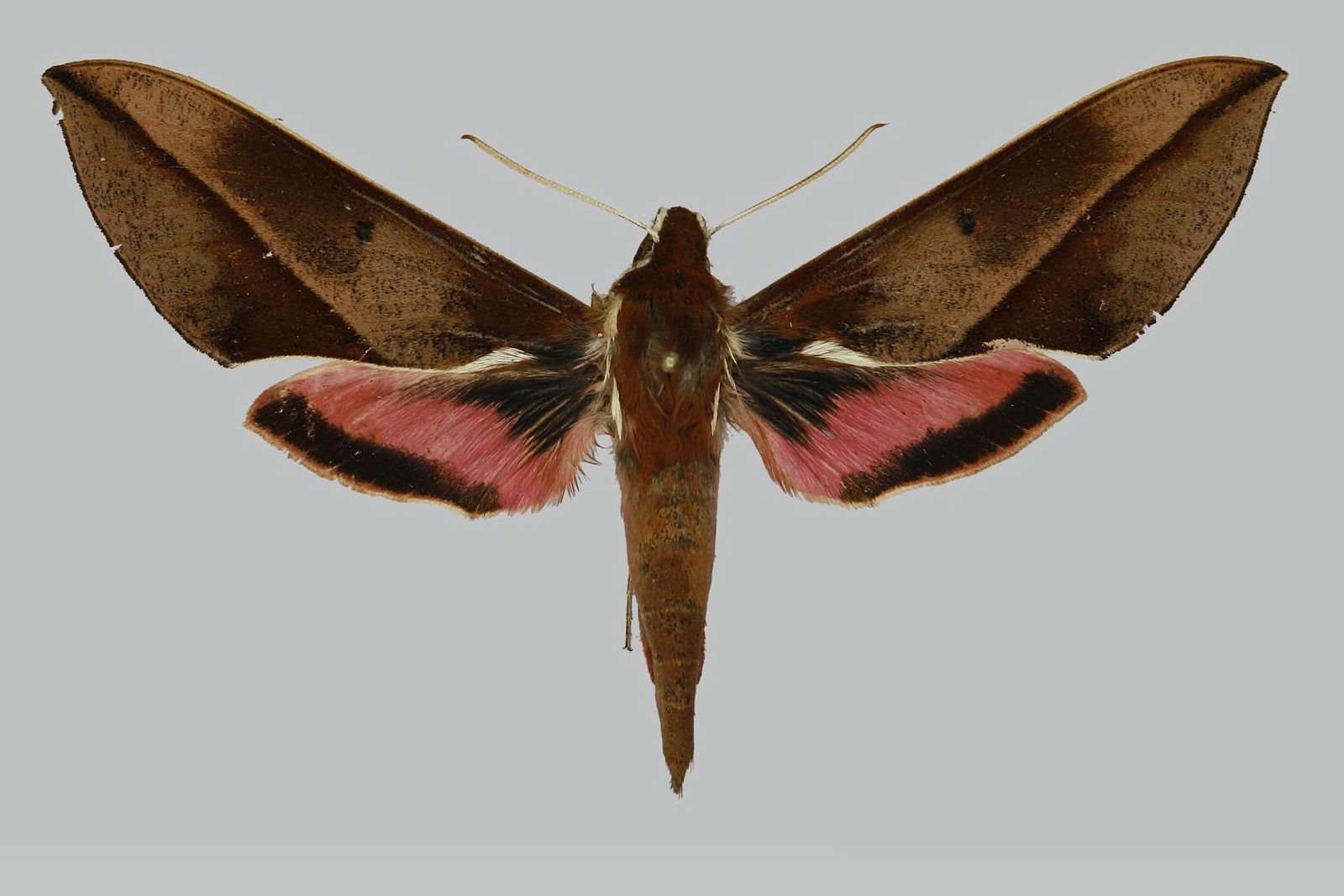
- Female

Scientific classification
- Kingdom: Animalia
- Phylum: Arthropoda
- Class: Insecta
- Order: Lepidoptera
- Family: Sphingidae
- Genus: Chaerocina
- Species: C. meridionalis

Binomial name
- Chaerocina meridionalis Carcasson, 1968

= Chaerocina meridionalis =

Species of moth

Chaerocina meridionalis is a moth of the family Sphingidae. It is known from highland forests in southern Tanzania and Malawi.
