= Carcinarctia rufa =

Scientific classification
- Kingdom: Animalia
- Phylum: Arthropoda
- Class: Insecta
- Order: Lepidoptera
- Superfamily: Noctuoidea
- Family: Erebidae
- Subfamily: Arctiinae
- Genus: Carcinarctia
- Species: C. rufa

Binomial name
- Carcinarctia rufa (Joicey & Talbot, 1921)

Synonyms
- Spilosoma rufa Joicey & Talbot, 1921; Spilosoma kivuensis Debauche, 1942; Carcinarctia xanthica Joicey & Talbot, 1924

Species of moth

Carcinarctia rufa is a moth of the family Erebidae. It was described by James John Joicey and George Talbot in 1921. It is found in the Democratic Republic of the Congo, Rwanda and Uganda.
