= Aethiopina argentifera =

Scientific classification
- Kingdom: Animalia
- Phylum: Arthropoda
- Class: Insecta
- Order: Lepidoptera
- Family: Cossidae
- Genus: Aethiopina
- Species: A. argentifera

Binomial name
- Aethiopina argentifera Gaede, 1929

Species of moth

Aethiopina argentifera is a moth in the family Cossidae. It is found in Kenya.
