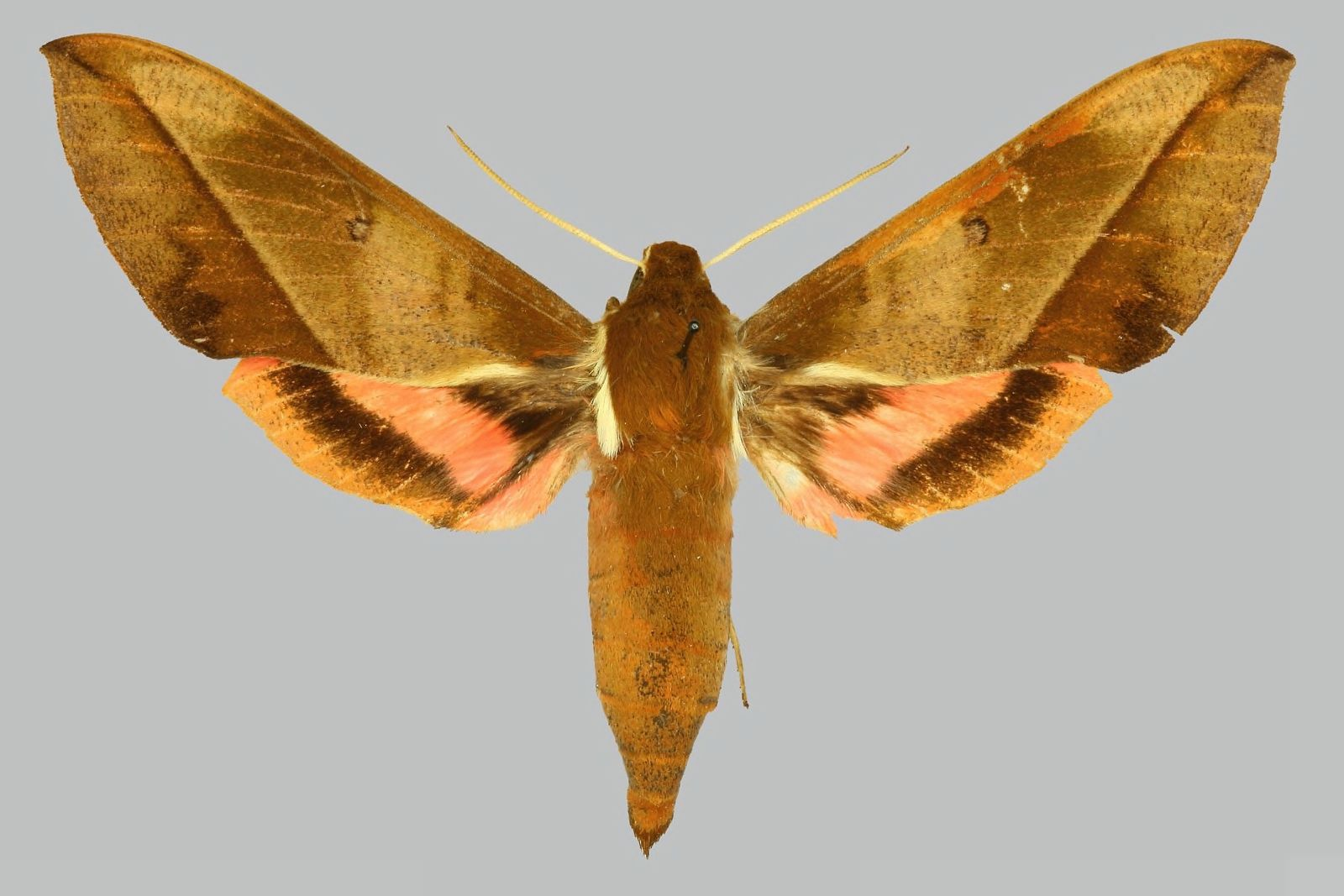
- Chaerocina dohertyi dohertyi, male

Scientific classification
- Kingdom: Animalia
- Phylum: Arthropoda
- Class: Insecta
- Order: Lepidoptera
- Family: Sphingidae
- Genus: Chaerocina
- Species: C. dohertyi

Binomial name
- Chaerocina dohertyi Rothschild & Jordan, 1903

= Chaerocina dohertyi =

Species of moth

Chaerocina dohertyi is a moth of the family Sphingidae. It is known from highland forests in Kenya and Uganda.

The length of the forewings is 45–49 mm.

== Subspecies ==
- Chaerocina dohertyi dohertyi
- Chaerocina dohertyi strangulata Darge, 2006 (Democratic Republic of the Congo)
