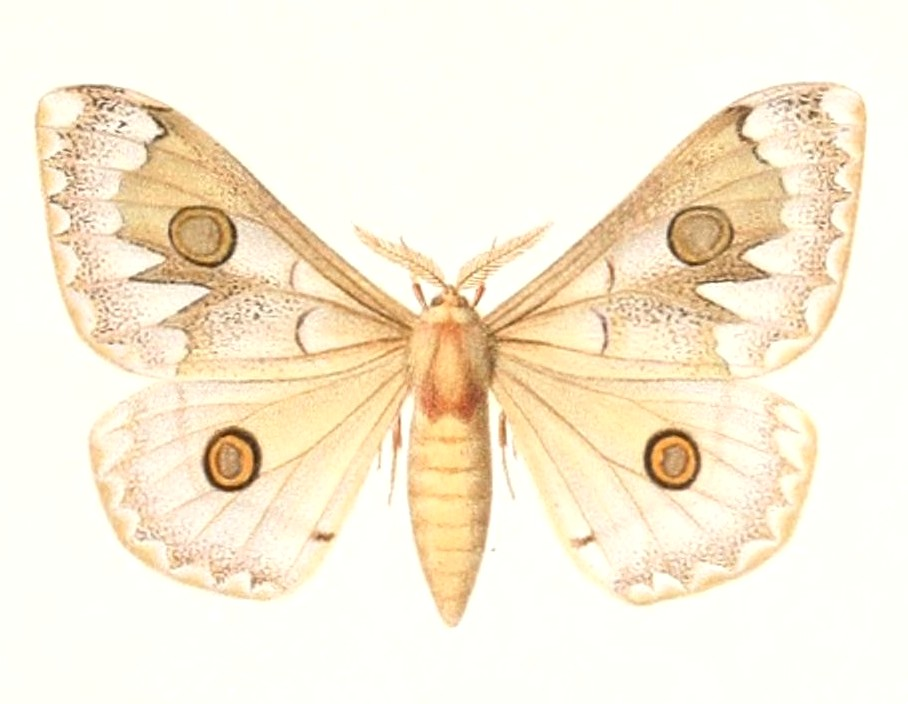

Scientific classification
- Domain: Eukaryota
- Kingdom: Animalia
- Phylum: Arthropoda
- Class: Insecta
- Order: Lepidoptera
- Family: Saturniidae
- Genus: Usta
- Species: U. angulata

Binomial name
- Usta angulata Rothschild, 1895

= Usta angulata =

Species of moth

Usta angulata, the angled emperor, is a species of moth in the family Saturniidae. It is found in Kenya, Tanzania, Somalia and Botswana.
