= Agriomelissa victrix =

Scientific classification
- Kingdom: Animalia
- Phylum: Arthropoda
- Class: Insecta
- Order: Lepidoptera
- Family: Sesiidae
- Genus: Agriomelissa
- Species: A. victrix

Binomial name
- Agriomelissa victrix (Le Cerf, 1916)

Synonyms
- Melittia victrix Le Cerf, 1916

Species of moth

Agriomelissa victrix is a moth of the family Sesiidae. It is known from Cameroon.
