= Aethiopina =

Scientific classification
- Kingdom: Animalia
- Phylum: Arthropoda
- Class: Insecta
- Order: Lepidoptera
- Family: Cossidae
- Subfamily: Metarbelinae
- Genus: Aethiopina; Gaede, 1929

Genus of moths

Aethiopina is a genus of moths in the family Cossidae.

== Species ==
- Aethiopina argentifera Gaede, 1929
- Aethiopina semicirculata Gaede, 1929
