= Chaerocina livingstonensis =

Scientific classification
- Kingdom: Animalia
- Phylum: Arthropoda
- Class: Insecta
- Order: Lepidoptera
- Family: Sphingidae
- Genus: Chaerocina
- Species: C. livingstonensis

Binomial name
- Chaerocina livingstonensis Darge, 2006

Species of moth

Chaerocina livingstonensis is a moth of the family Sphingidae that is endemic to Tanzania.
