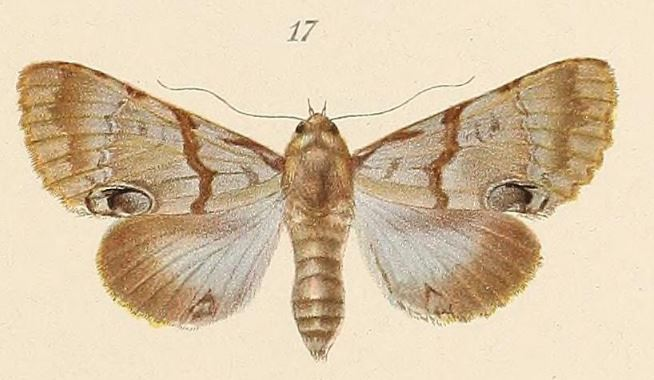

Scientific classification
- Kingdom: Animalia
- Phylum: Arthropoda
- Class: Insecta
- Order: Lepidoptera
- Superfamily: Noctuoidea
- Family: Noctuidae
- Genus: Thiacidas
- Species: T. alboporphyrea

Binomial name
- Thiacidas alboporphyrea (Pagenstecher, 1907)

Synonyms
- Trisula alboporphyrea Pagenstecher, 1907

= Thiacidas alboporphyrea =

Species of moth

Thiacidas alboporphyrea is a moth of the family Noctuidae. It is found in Madagascar and the adults have a wingspan of 50 mm.

== See also ==
- List of moths of Madagascar
