= Amphia sogai =

Scientific classification
- Kingdom: Animalia
- Phylum: Arthropoda
- Clade: Pancrustacea
- Class: Insecta
- Order: Lepidoptera
- Superfamily: Noctuoidea
- Family: Noctuidae
- Genus: Amphia
- Species: A. sogai

Binomial name
- Amphia sogai Viette, 1967

Species of moth

Amphia sogai is a moth of the family Noctuidae first described by Pierre Viette in 1967. It is found in northern Madagascar.

Its wingspan ranges from 42 to 46 mm, with a length of the forewings of 21 to 23 mm. This species is close to Amphia gigantea Viette, 1958.
