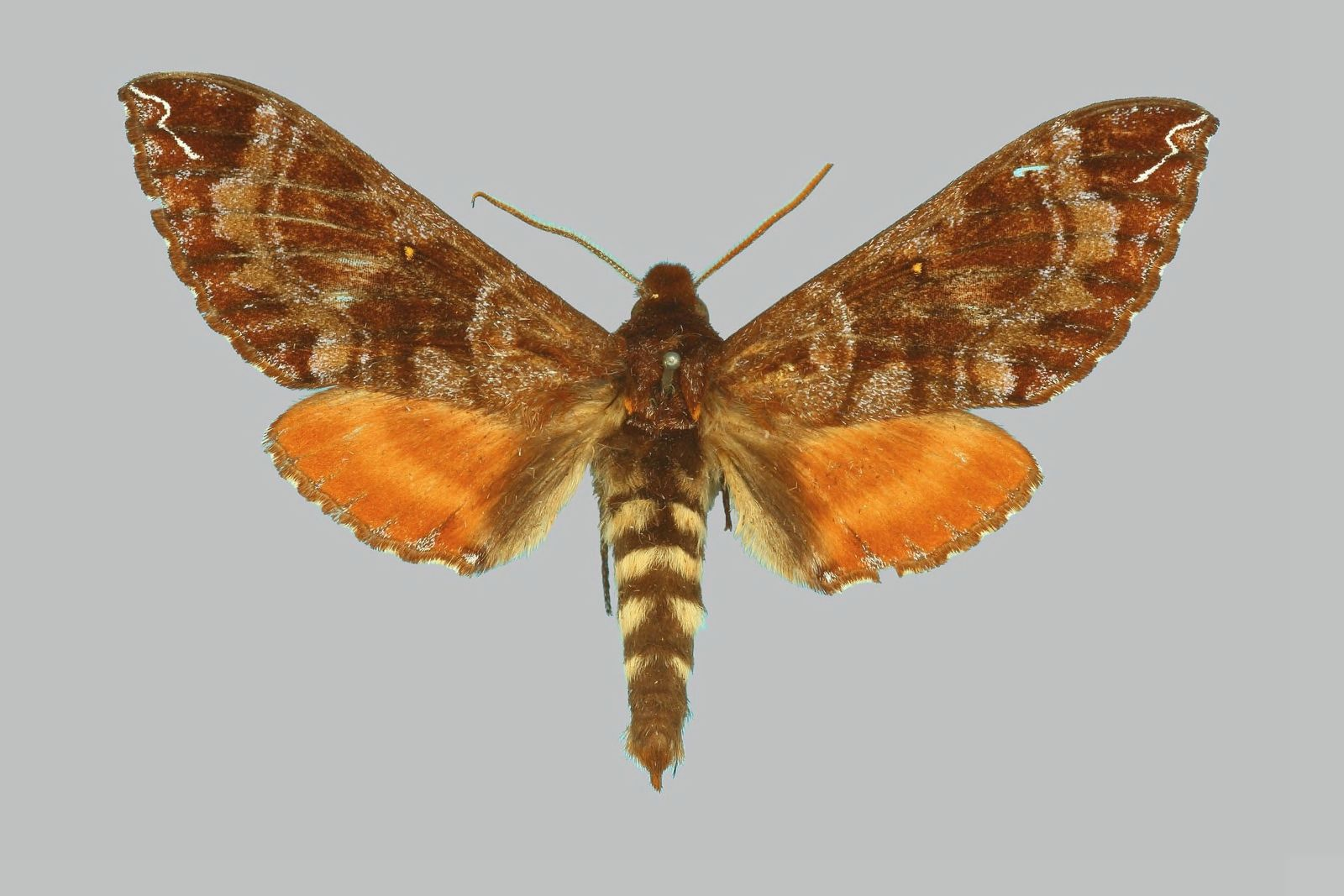
- Male Dovania poecila poecila

Scientific classification
- Domain: Eukaryota
- Kingdom: Animalia
- Phylum: Arthropoda
- Class: Insecta
- Order: Lepidoptera
- Family: Sphingidae
- Tribe: Sphingini
- Genus: Dovania; Rothschild & Jordan, 1903

= Dovania =

Genus of moths

Dovania is a genus of moths in the family Sphingidae. The genus was erected by Walter Rothschild and Karl Jordan in 1903

== Species ==
- Dovania dargei Pierre, 2000
- Dovania mirei Pierre, 2000
- Dovania neumanni Jordan 1925
- Dovania poecila Rothschild & Jordan 1903
