= Chaerocina nyikiana =

Scientific classification
- Kingdom: Animalia
- Phylum: Arthropoda
- Clade: Pancrustacea
- Class: Insecta
- Order: Lepidoptera
- Family: Sphingidae
- Genus: Chaerocina
- Species: C. nyikiana

Binomial name
- Chaerocina nyikiana Darge & Basquin, 2008

Species of moth

Chaerocina nyikiana is a moth of the family Sphingidae. It is known from Malawi.
