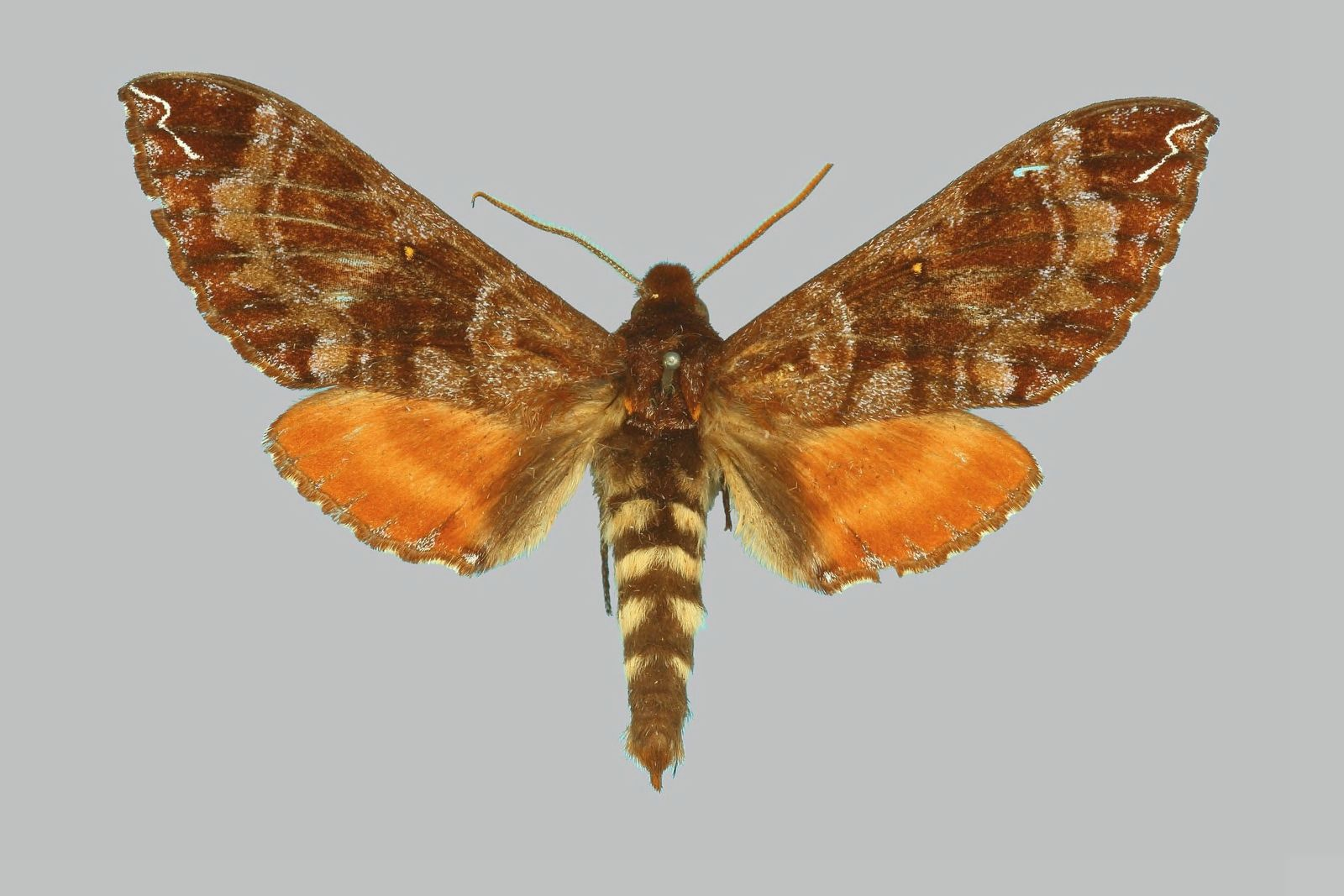
- Male Dovania poecila poecila

Scientific classification
- Domain: Eukaryota
- Kingdom: Animalia
- Phylum: Arthropoda
- Class: Insecta
- Order: Lepidoptera
- Family: Sphingidae
- Genus: Dovania
- Species: D. poecila

Binomial name
- Dovania poecila Rothschild & Jordan, 1903

Synonyms
- Dovania poecila inops Gehlen, 1951

= Dovania poecila =

Species of moth

Dovania poecila is a moth of the family Sphingidae. It is known from forests (usually above 4,000 feet) in Kenya, Uganda, Rwanda, Burundi, Tanzania and Malawi.

The length of the forewings is 30–35 mm.

The larvae feed on Acanthus pubescens.
