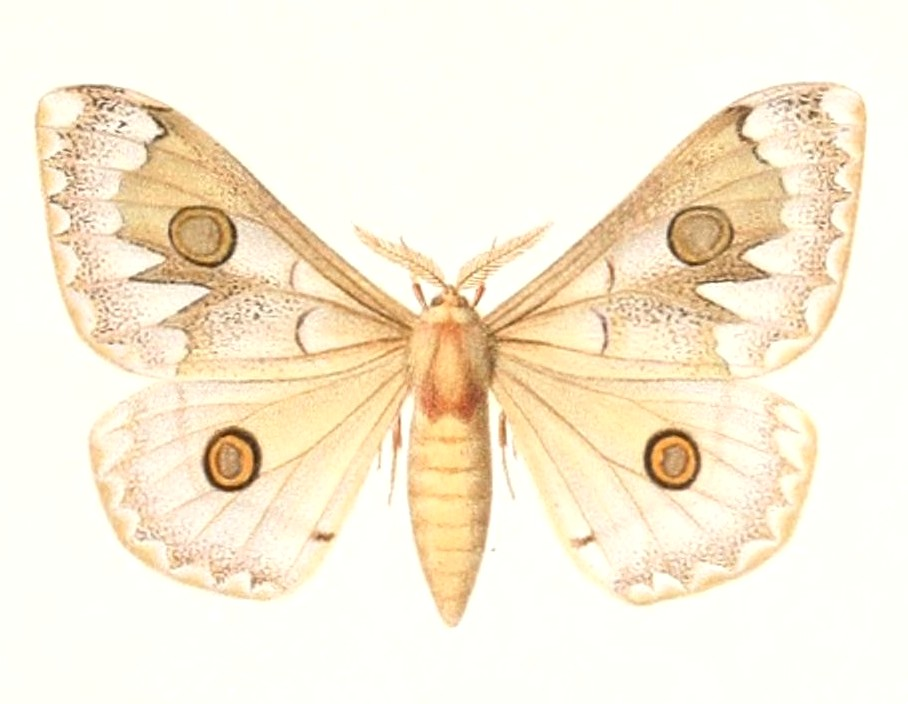
- Usta angulata

Scientific classification
- Domain: Eukaryota
- Kingdom: Animalia
- Phylum: Arthropoda
- Class: Insecta
- Order: Lepidoptera
- Family: Saturniidae
- Genus: Usta; Wallengren, 1863

= Usta (moth) =

Genus of moths

Usta is a genus of moths in the family Saturniidae first described by Hans Daniel Johan Wallengren in 1863.

== Species ==
- Usta alba Terral & Lequeux, 1991
- Usta angulata Rothschild, 1895
- Usta biplaga Rebel, 1912
- Usta grantae Terral & Lequeux, 1991
- Usta subangulata Bouvier, 1930
- Usta terpsichore (Maassen & Weyding, 1885)
- Usta wallengrenii (C. Felder & R. Felder, 1859)
