= Tegostoma richteri =

Scientific classification
- Kingdom: Animalia
- Phylum: Arthropoda
- Class: Insecta
- Order: Lepidoptera
- Family: Crambidae
- Subfamily: Odontiinae
- Tribe: Odontiini
- Genus: Tegostoma
- Species: T. richteri

Binomial name
- Tegostoma richteri Amsel, 1963

Species of moth

Tegostoma richteri is a species of moth in the family Crambidae. It is found in Ethiopia.

This species has a wingspan of 16–18 mm.

== See also ==
- List of moths of Ethiopia
