= Agriomelissa malagasy =

Scientific classification
- Kingdom: Animalia
- Phylum: Arthropoda
- Class: Insecta
- Order: Lepidoptera
- Family: Sesiidae
- Genus: Agriomelissa
- Species: A. malagasy

Binomial name
- Agriomelissa malagasy (Viette, 1982)

Synonyms
- Melittia malagasy Viette, 1982

Species of moth

Agriomelissa malagasy is a moth of the family Sesiidae. It is known from Madagascar.
