= Kenyarctia =

Scientific classification
- Kingdom: Animalia
- Phylum: Arthropoda
- Clade: Pancrustacea
- Class: Insecta
- Order: Lepidoptera
- Superfamily: Noctuoidea
- Family: Erebidae
- Subfamily: Arctiinae
- Subtribe: Spilosomina
- Genus: Kenyarctia; Dubatolov, 2013

Genus of moths

Kenyarctia is a genus of tiger moths in the family Erebidae.

== Species ==
- Kenyarctia epicaste (Fawcett, 1915)
- Kenyarctia melanogastra (Holland, 1897)
- Kenyarctia occidentalis (Bartel, 1903)
