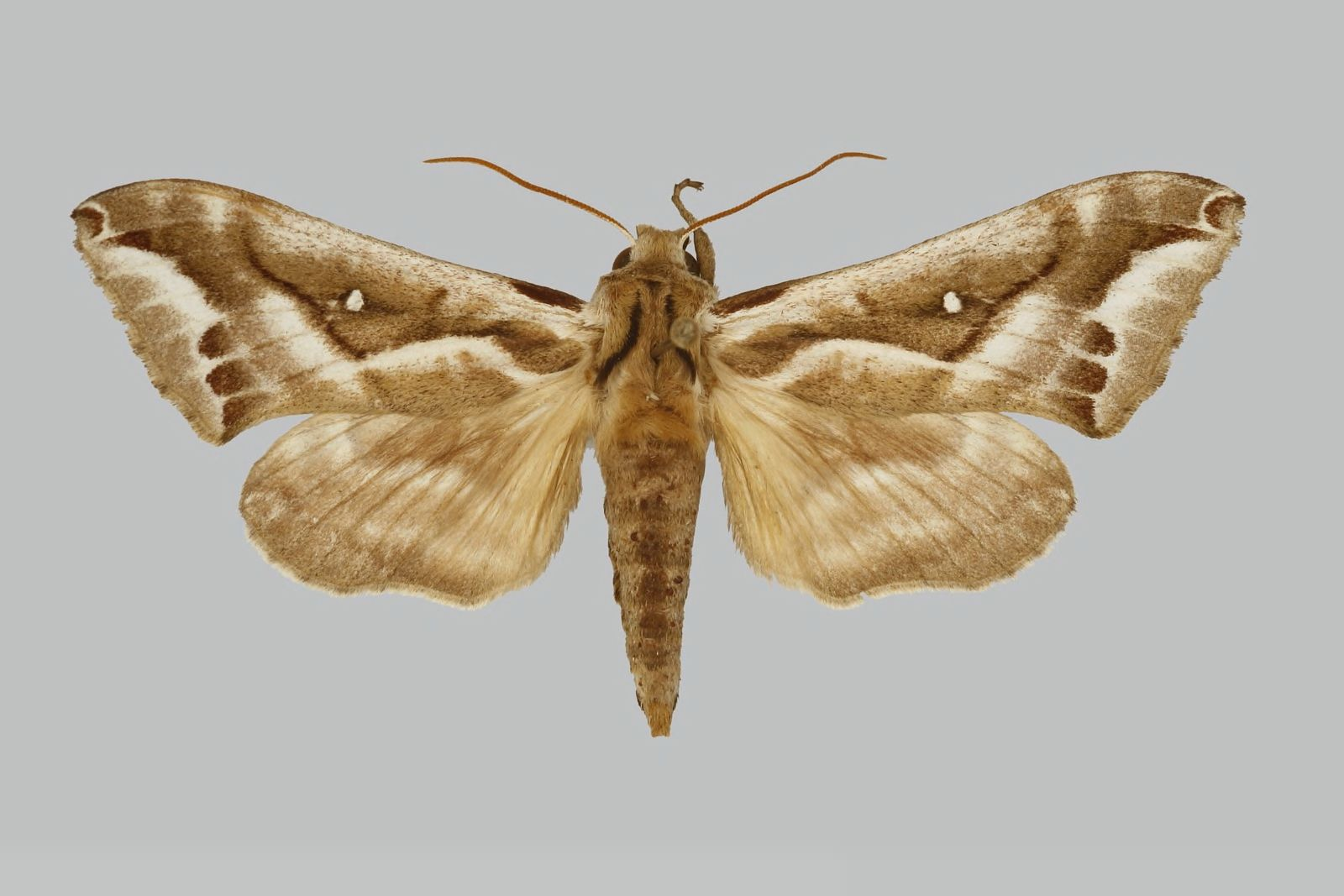
- Male

Scientific classification
- Domain: Eukaryota
- Kingdom: Animalia
- Phylum: Arthropoda
- Class: Insecta
- Order: Lepidoptera
- Family: Sphingidae
- Genus: Ceridia
- Species: C. nigricans

Binomial name
- Ceridia nigricans Griveaud, 1959

Synonyms
- Ceridia stuckenbergi Griveaud, 1959

= Ceridia nigricans =

Species of moth

Ceridia nigricans is a moth of the family Sphingidae. It is known from Madagascar.
