= Carcinarctia kivuensis =

Scientific classification
- Kingdom: Animalia
- Phylum: Arthropoda
- Class: Insecta
- Order: Lepidoptera
- Superfamily: Noctuoidea
- Family: Erebidae
- Subfamily: Arctiinae
- Genus: Carcinarctia
- Species: C. kivuensis

Binomial name
- Carcinarctia kivuensis Joicey & Talbot, 1924

Species of moth

Carcinarctia kivuensis is a moth of the family Erebidae. It was described by James John Joicey and George Talbot in 1924. It is found in the Democratic Republic of the Congo, Tanzania and Zaire.
