= Scopula nemorivagata =

Scientific classification
- Kingdom: Animalia
- Phylum: Arthropoda
- Class: Insecta
- Order: Lepidoptera
- Family: Geometridae
- Genus: Scopula
- Species: S. nemorivagata

Binomial name
- Scopula nemorivagata Wallengren, 1863

Synonyms
- Craspedia bonaventura Warren, 1897

Species of geometer moth in subfamily Sterrhinae

Scopula nemorivagata is a moth of the family Geometridae. It is found in Ethiopia, Nigeria and South Africa.
