= Scopula silonaria =

Scientific classification
- Kingdom: Animalia
- Phylum: Arthropoda
- Class: Insecta
- Order: Lepidoptera
- Family: Geometridae
- Genus: Scopula
- Species: S. silonaria

Binomial name
- Scopula silonaria (Guenée, [1858])

Synonyms
- Phyletis silonaria Guenee, 1857; Phyletis sticticata Warren, 1901

Species of geometer moth in subfamily Sterrhinae

Scopula silonaria is a moth of the family Geometridae. It is found in the Democratic Republic of Congo, Ethiopia, Kenya, Tanzania and Uganda.
