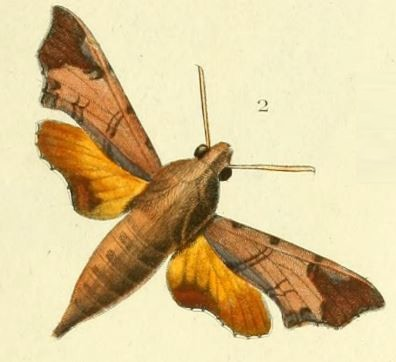

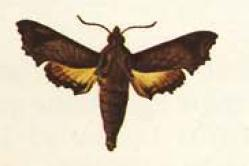

Scientific classification
- Kingdom: Animalia
- Phylum: Arthropoda
- Class: Insecta
- Order: Lepidoptera
- Family: Sphingidae
- Genus: Temnora
- Species: T. pseudopylas

Binomial name
- Temnora pseudopylas (Rothschild, 1894)

Synonyms
- Lophuron pseudopylas Rothschild, 1894; Lophuron brisaeus Wallengren, 1865; Temnora congoi Clark, 1936

= Temnora pseudopylas =

Species of moth

Temnora pseudopylas is a moth of the family Sphingidae. It is very common in eastern and southern Africa, but absent in very dry habitats.

The length of the forewings is 20–22 mm and the wingspan is 42–49 mm.

The larvae feed on Pentas bussei.

== Subspecies ==
- Temnora pseudopylas pseudopylas
- Temnora pseudopylas latimargo Rothschild & Jordan, 1903 (Comoro Islands)
- Temnora pseudopylas leptis Rothschild & Jordan, 1903 (Sierra Leone)
