= Kenyarctia melanogastra =

Scientific classification
- Domain: Eukaryota
- Kingdom: Animalia
- Phylum: Arthropoda
- Class: Insecta
- Order: Lepidoptera
- Superfamily: Noctuoidea
- Family: Erebidae
- Subfamily: Arctiinae
- Genus: Kenyarctia
- Species: K. melanogastra

Binomial name
- Kenyarctia melanogastra (Holland, 1897)

Synonyms
- Cycnia melanogastra Holland, 1897; Amsacta melanogastra

Species of moth

Kenyarctia melanogastra is a moth in the family Erebidae. It was described by William J. Holland in 1897. It is found in Ethiopia and Somalia.
