= Aethiopina semicirculata =

Scientific classification
- Kingdom: Animalia
- Phylum: Arthropoda
- Clade: Pancrustacea
- Class: Insecta
- Order: Lepidoptera
- Family: Cossidae
- Genus: Aethiopina
- Species: A. semicirculata

Binomial name
- Aethiopina semicirculata Gaede, 1929

Species of moth

Aethiopina semicirculata is a moth in the family Cossidae. It is found in Ethiopia.
