= Hellinsia aethiopicus =

Scientific classification
- Domain: Eukaryota
- Kingdom: Animalia
- Phylum: Arthropoda
- Class: Insecta
- Order: Lepidoptera
- Family: Pterophoridae
- Genus: Hellinsia
- Species: H. aethiopicus

Binomial name
- Hellinsia aethiopicus (Amsel, 1963)

Synonyms
- Leioptilus aethiopicus Amsel, 1963

Species of plume moth

Hellinsia aethiopicus is a moth of the family Pterophoridae. It is known from the Democratic Republic of Congo, Ethiopia and Nigeria.
