= Eupithecia rubristigma =

Scientific classification
- Kingdom: Animalia
- Phylum: Arthropoda
- Clade: Pancrustacea
- Class: Insecta
- Order: Lepidoptera
- Family: Geometridae
- Genus: Eupithecia
- Species: E. rubristigma

Binomial name
- Eupithecia rubristigma L. B. Prout, 1932

Species of moth

Eupithecia rubristigma is a moth in the family Geometridae. It is found in Ethiopia and Kenya.

The larvae feed on Acacia xanthophloea.
