= Ussara semicoronis =

Scientific classification
- Kingdom: Animalia
- Phylum: Arthropoda
- Class: Insecta
- Order: Lepidoptera
- Family: Glyphipterigidae
- Genus: Ussara
- Species: U. semicoronis

Binomial name
- Ussara semicoronis Meyrick, 1932

Species of moth

Ussara semicoronis is a moth in the family Glyphipterigidae. It is known from Ethiopia.
