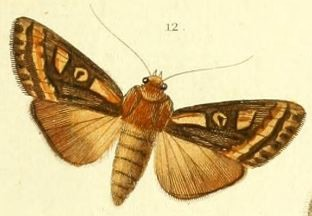

Scientific classification
- Kingdom: Animalia
- Phylum: Arthropoda
- Class: Insecta
- Order: Lepidoptera
- Superfamily: Noctuoidea
- Family: Noctuidae
- Genus: Amphia
- Species: A. hepialoides

Binomial name
- Amphia hepialoides Guenée, 1852

= Amphia hepialoides =

Species of moth

Amphia hepialoides is a moth of the family Noctuidae first described by Achille Guenée in 1852. It is found in Ethiopia.
