= Agriomelissa aethiopica =

Scientific classification
- Kingdom: Animalia
- Phylum: Arthropoda
- Class: Insecta
- Order: Lepidoptera
- Family: Sesiidae
- Genus: Agriomelissa
- Species: A. aethiopica

Binomial name
- Agriomelissa aethiopica (Le Cerf, 1917)

Synonyms
- Melittia aethiopica Le Cerf, 1917

Species of moth

Agriomelissa aethiopica is a moth of the family Sesiidae. It is known from Ethiopia.
