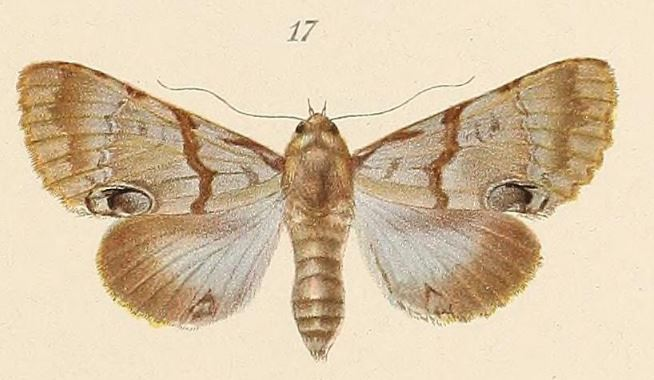
- Thiacidas alboporphyrea

Scientific classification
- Kingdom: Animalia
- Phylum: Arthropoda
- Class: Insecta
- Order: Lepidoptera
- Superfamily: Noctuoidea
- Family: Noctuidae
- Genus: Thiacidas; Walker, 1855

Synonyms
- Auchenisa Hampson, 1905; Galactomoia Fawcett, 1916; Panthauma Staudinger, 1892; Pteronycta Fawcett, 1918; Trisula Moore, 1858; Trisulana Bethune-Baker, 1911

= Thiacidas =

Genus of moths

Thiacidas is a genus of moths of the family Noctuidae described by Francis Walker in 1855. Species are distributed throughout India, Sri Lanka and Myanmar.

== Description ==
Palpi porrect (extending forward) and slender, reaching vertex of head. Second joint is hairy. Legs naked with short spurs. Antennae fasciculated in male. Metathorax with a slight tuft. Abdomen with thick woolly hair on dorsum of proximal segments. Tibia hair and spineless. Forewings are longer and narrow with somewhat arched costa towards apex. Hindwings with veins 3 and 4 usually stalked and veins 6 and 7 usually from cell.

== Species ==
- Thiacidas acronictoides (Berio, 1950)
- Thiacidas adnanensis (Wiltshire, 1980)
- Thiacidas alboporphyrea (Pagenstecher, 1907)
- Thiacidas berenice (Fawcett, 1916)
- Thiacidas callipona (Bethune-Baker, 1911)
- Thiacidas cerurodes (Hampson, 1916)
  - Thiacidas cerurodes asiriensis Hacker & Fibiger, 2002
  - Thiacidas cerurodes cerurodes Hampson, 1916
- Thiacidas cookei (Pinhey, 1958)
- Thiacidas duplicata (Grünberg, 1910)
- Thiacidas egregia Staudinger, 1892
- Thiacidas fasciata (Fawcett, 1917)
- Thiacidas fractilinea Pinhey, 1968
- Thiacidas fuscomacula Hacker & Zilli, 2010
- Thiacidas hampsoni (Hacker, 2004)
- Thiacidas intermedia Hacker & Zilli, 2007
- Thiacidas ivoiriana Hacker & Zilli, 2010
- Thiacidas juvenis Hacker & Zilli, 2007
- Thiacidas kanoensis Hacker & Zilli, 2007
- Thiacidas khomasana Mey, 2011
- Thiacidas krooni Hacker & Zilli, 2007
- Thiacidas legraini Hacker & Zilli, 2007
- Thiacidas leonie Hacker & Zilli, 2007
- Thiacidas meii Hacker & Zilli, 2007
- Thiacidas morettoi Hacker & Zilli, 2010
- Thiacidas mukim (Berio, 1977)
- Thiacidas nigrimacula (Pinhey, 1968)
- Thiacidas occidentalis Hacker & Zilli, 2010
- Thiacidas orientalis Hacker & Zilli, 2010
- Thiacidas permutata Hacker & Zilli, 2007
- Thiacidas politzari Hacker & Zilli, 2010
- Thiacidas postalbida (Gaede, 1939)
- Thiacidas postica Walker, 1855
- Thiacidas robertbecki Hacker & Zilli, 2007
- Thiacidas roseotincta (Pinhey, 1962)
  - Thiacidas roseotincta albata Wiltshire, 1994
  - Thiacidas roseotincta roseotincta Pinhey, 1962
- Thiacidas schausi (Hampson, 1905)
- Thiacidas senex (Bethune-Baker, 1911)
- Thiacidas smythi (Gaede, 1939)
- Thiacidas somaliensis Hacker & Zilli, 2010
- Thiacidas stassarti Hacker & Zilli, 2007
- Thiacidas subhampsoni Hacker & Zilli, 2010
- Thiacidas submutata Hacker & Zilli, 2007
- Thiacidas triangulata (Gaede, 1939)
