= Cyana ugandana =

Scientific classification
- Domain: Eukaryota
- Kingdom: Animalia
- Phylum: Arthropoda
- Class: Insecta
- Order: Lepidoptera
- Superfamily: Noctuoidea
- Family: Erebidae
- Subfamily: Arctiinae
- Genus: Cyana
- Species: C. ugandana

Binomial name
- Cyana ugandana (Strand, 1912)

Synonyms
- Chionaema ugandana Strand, 1912; Bizone porrima Holland, 1893

Species of moth

Cyana ugandana is a moth of the family Erebidae. It was described by Strand in 1912. It is found in the Democratic Republic of Congo, Ethiopia, Kenya and Uganda.

== Subspecies ==
- Cyana ugandana ugandana
- Cyana ugandana abyssinica Karisch, 2003 (Ethiopia)
