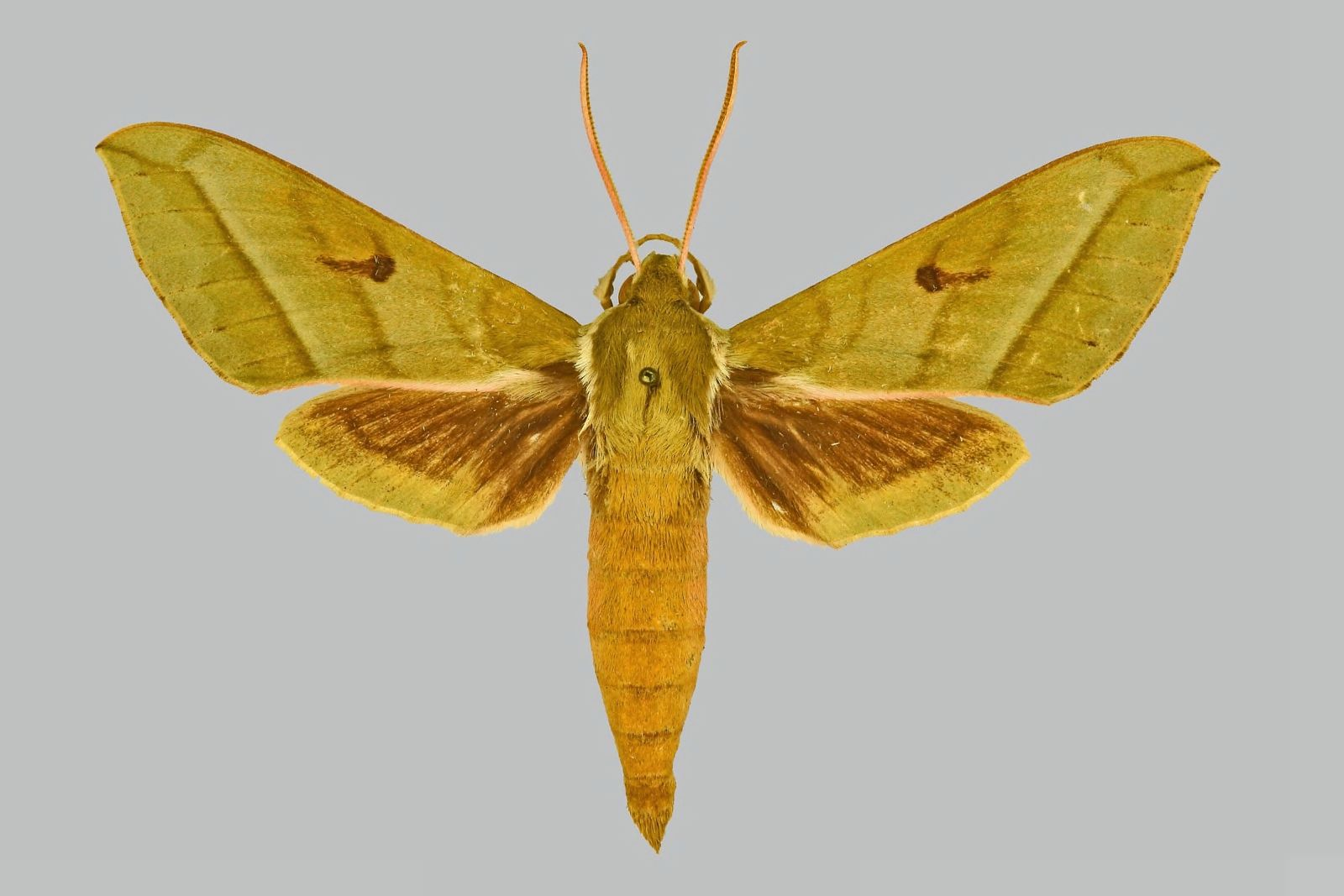
- Male

Scientific classification
- Kingdom: Animalia
- Phylum: Arthropoda
- Class: Insecta
- Order: Lepidoptera
- Family: Sphingidae
- Genus: Chaerocina
- Species: C. jordani

Binomial name
- Chaerocina jordani Berio, 1938

= Chaerocina jordani =

Species of moth

Chaerocina jordani is a moth of the family Sphingidae. It is known from the highlands of Ethiopia.

The length of the forewings is 37–38 mm.
