= Eupithecia isotenes =

Scientific classification
- Kingdom: Animalia
- Phylum: Arthropoda
- Clade: Pancrustacea
- Class: Insecta
- Order: Lepidoptera
- Family: Geometridae
- Genus: Eupithecia
- Species: E. isotenes

Binomial name
- Eupithecia isotenes L. B. Prout, 1932

Species of moth

Eupithecia isotenes is a moth in the family Geometridae first described by Louis Beethoven Prout in 1932. It is found in Ethiopia and Kenya.
