= Eupithecia ochralba =

Scientific classification
- Kingdom: Animalia
- Phylum: Arthropoda
- Class: Insecta
- Order: Lepidoptera
- Family: Geometridae
- Genus: Eupithecia
- Species: E. ochralba

Binomial name
- Eupithecia ochralba Herbulot, 1983

Species of moth

Eupithecia ochralba is a moth in the family Geometridae. It is found in Ethiopia.
