= Constantiodes =

Scientific classification
- Kingdom: Animalia
- Phylum: Arthropoda
- Class: Insecta
- Order: Lepidoptera
- Superfamily: Noctuoidea
- Family: Noctuidae
- Genus: Constantiodes; Hampson, 1916
- Species: C. pyralina

Binomial name
- Constantiodes pyralina Hampson, 1916

Synonyms
- Generic: Pluxilloides Berio, 1944; Specific: Pluxilloides hartigi Berio, 1944

Genus of moths

Constantiodes is a monotypic moth genus of the family Noctuidae. Its only species, Constantiodes pyralina, is found in Ethiopia, Kenya, Mauritania, Oman, Saudi Arabia and Somalia. Both the genus and species were first described by George Hampson in 1916.
