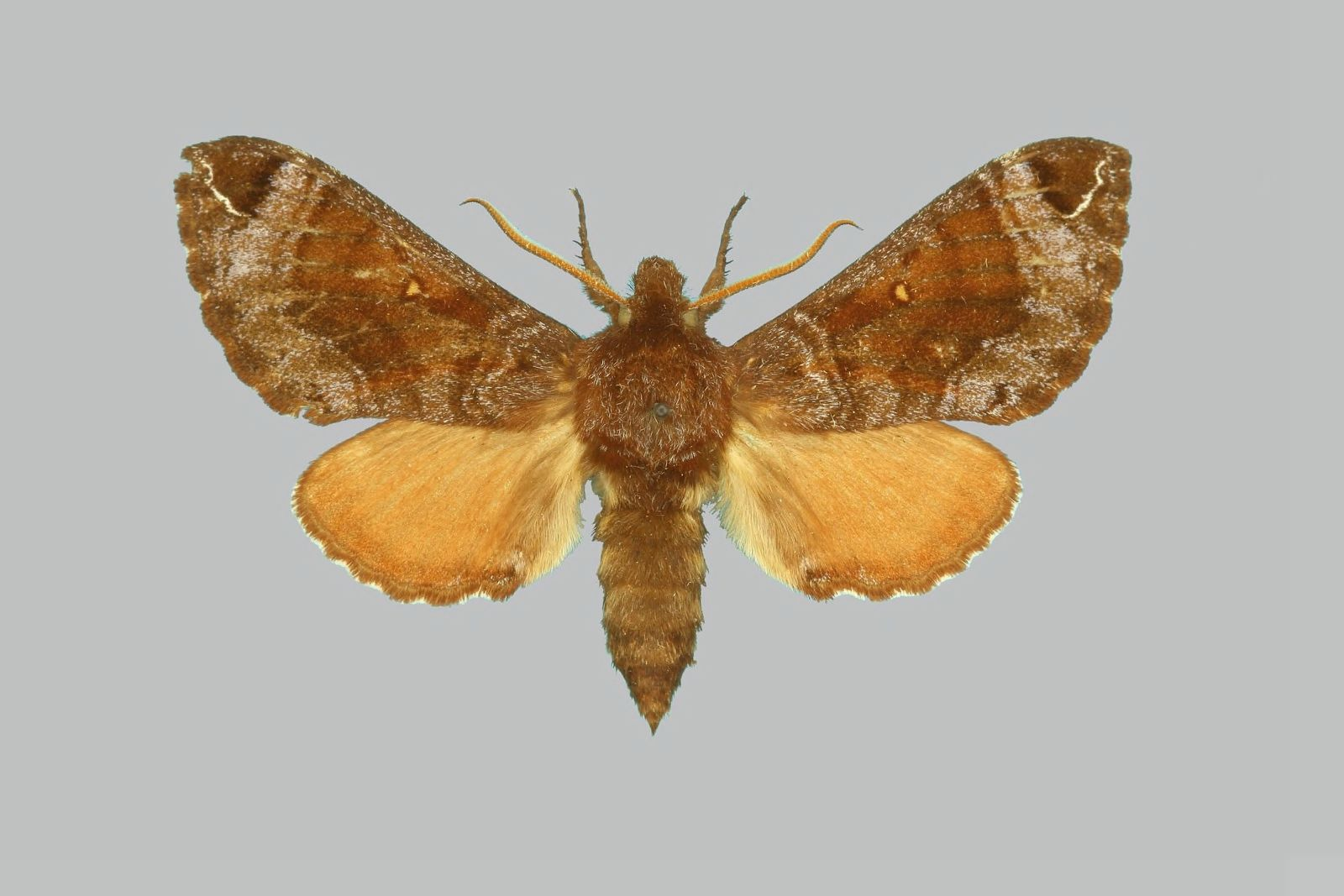
- Male

Scientific classification
- Kingdom: Animalia
- Phylum: Arthropoda
- Class: Insecta
- Order: Lepidoptera
- Family: Sphingidae
- Genus: Dovania
- Species: D. neumanni

Binomial name
- Dovania neumanni Jordan, 1925

= Dovania neumanni =

Species of moth

Dovania neumanni is a moth of the family Sphingidae. It is known from forests in Ethiopia.
