= Eupithecia angulata =

Scientific classification
- Kingdom: Animalia
- Phylum: Arthropoda
- Clade: Pancrustacea
- Class: Insecta
- Order: Lepidoptera
- Family: Geometridae
- Genus: Eupithecia
- Species: E. angulata

Binomial name
- Eupithecia angulata D. S. Fletcher, 1951

Species of moth

Eupithecia angulata is a moth in the family Geometridae. It was described by David Stephen Fletcher in 1951 and is found in Ethiopia.
