= Carcinarctia rougeoti =

Scientific classification
- Kingdom: Animalia
- Phylum: Arthropoda
- Class: Insecta
- Order: Lepidoptera
- Superfamily: Noctuoidea
- Family: Erebidae
- Subfamily: Arctiinae
- Genus: Carcinarctia
- Species: C. rougeoti

Binomial name
- Carcinarctia rougeoti Toulgoët, 1977

Species of moth

Carcinarctia rougeoti is a moth of the family Erebidae. It was described by Hervé de Toulgoët in 1977. It is found in Ethiopia.
