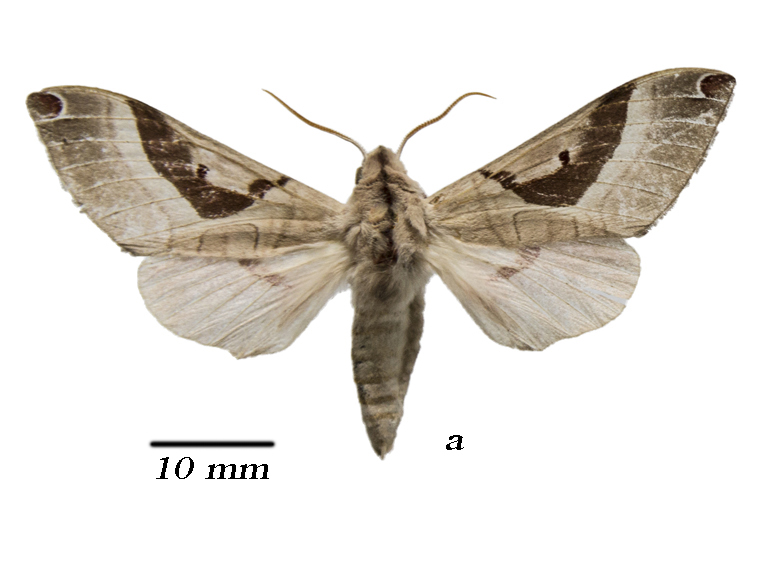

Scientific classification
- Domain: Eukaryota
- Kingdom: Animalia
- Phylum: Arthropoda
- Class: Insecta
- Order: Lepidoptera
- Family: Sphingidae
- Genus: Ceridia
- Species: C. heuglini

Binomial name
- Ceridia heuglini (R. Felder, 1874)

Synonyms
- Smerinthus heuglini R. Felder, 1874

= Ceridia heuglini =

Species of moth

Ceridia heuglini is a moth of the family Sphingidae. It is known from savanna and grassland from Mali and Chad to Sudan, the Central African Republic and Uganda.

The length of the forewings is about 30 mm.
