= Eupithecia semipallida =

Scientific classification
- Domain: Eukaryota
- Kingdom: Animalia
- Phylum: Arthropoda
- Class: Insecta
- Order: Lepidoptera
- Family: Geometridae
- Genus: Eupithecia
- Species: E. semipallida

Binomial name
- Eupithecia semipallida Janse, 1933

Species of moth

Eupithecia semipallida is a moth in the family Geometridae. It is found in the Democratic Republic of Congo, Ethiopia, Kenya, Madagascar, Tanzania, Uganda and Zimbabwe.
