= Tytroca alabuensis =

Scientific classification
- Kingdom: Animalia
- Phylum: Arthropoda
- Class: Insecta
- Order: Lepidoptera
- Superfamily: Noctuoidea
- Family: Erebidae
- Genus: Tytroca
- Species: T. alabuensis

Binomial name
- Tytroca alabuensis Wiltshire, 1970

Species of moth

Tytroca alabuensis is a moth of the family Noctuidae first described by Wiltshire in 1970. It is found in Africa, including Ethiopia, Kenya, Namibia, Somalia and Tanzania.
