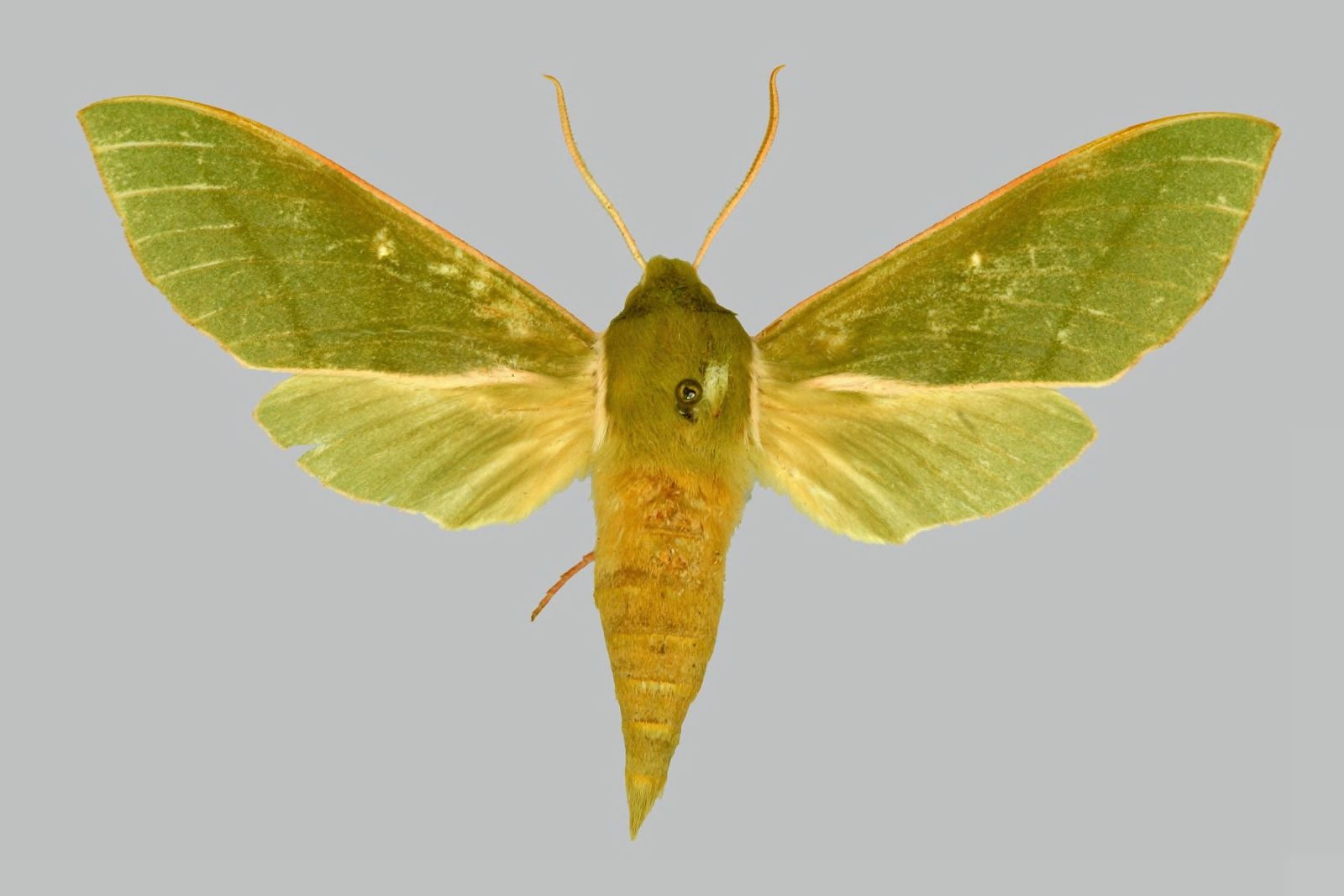
- Male

Scientific classification
- Kingdom: Animalia
- Phylum: Arthropoda
- Class: Insecta
- Order: Lepidoptera
- Family: Sphingidae
- Genus: Chaerocina
- Species: C. ellisoni

Binomial name
- Chaerocina ellisoni Hayes, 1963

= Chaerocina ellisoni =

Species of moth

Chaerocina ellisoni is a moth of the family Sphingidae. It is known from the highlands of Ethiopia.

The length of the forewings is about 34 mm.
