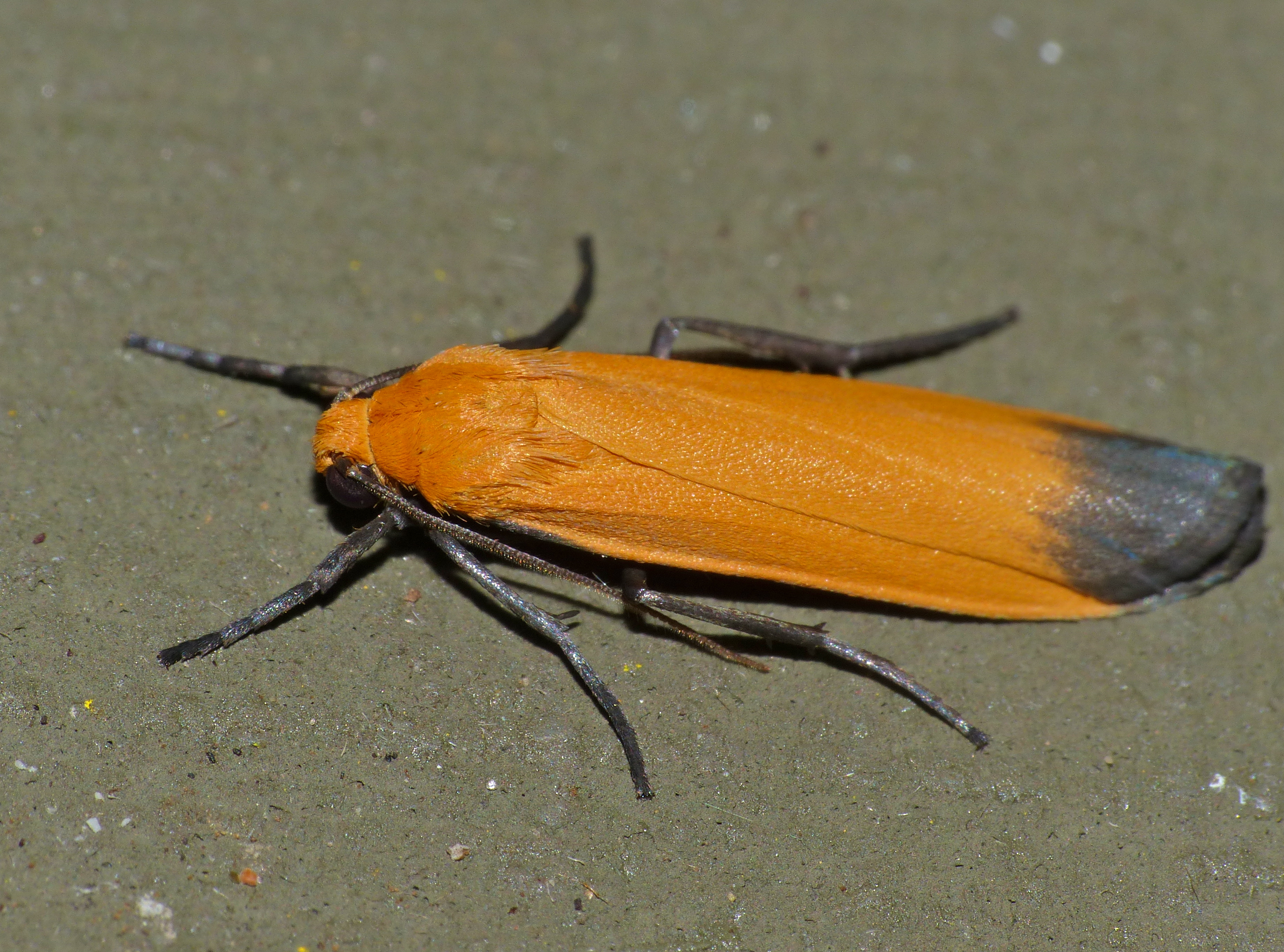

Scientific classification
- Kingdom: Animalia
- Phylum: Arthropoda
- Clade: Pancrustacea
- Class: Insecta
- Order: Lepidoptera
- Superfamily: Noctuoidea
- Family: Erebidae
- Subfamily: Arctiinae
- Genus: Eilema
- Species: E. elegans

Binomial name
- Eilema elegans (Butler, 1877)

Synonyms
- Dyphlebia elegans Butler, 1877; Eilema elegans var. mashonensis Strand, 1922

= Eilema elegans =

Species of moth

Eilema elegans is a moth of the subfamily Arctiinae. It was described by Arthur Gardiner Butler in 1877. It is found in Ethiopia, South Africa, Zambia and Zimbabwe.

== Subspecies ==
- Eilema elegans elegans
- Eilema elegans restricta Hampson, 1910 (Zambia)
