= Tytroca leucoptera =

Scientific classification
- Kingdom: Animalia
- Phylum: Arthropoda
- Class: Insecta
- Order: Lepidoptera
- Superfamily: Noctuoidea
- Family: Erebidae
- Genus: Tytroca
- Species: T. leucoptera

Binomial name
- Tytroca leucoptera (Hampson, 1896)

Synonyms
- Polydesma balnearia; Hypaetra leucoptera

Species of moth

Tytroca leucoptera is a moth of the family Noctuidae first described by George Hampson in 1896. It is found in the Arabian Peninsula and all deserts of North Africa.

There are multiple generations per year. Adults are on wing in October in Israel.

The larvae probably feed on Acacia species.
