= Thiacidas leonie =

Scientific classification
- Kingdom: Animalia
- Phylum: Arthropoda
- Class: Insecta
- Order: Lepidoptera
- Superfamily: Noctuoidea
- Family: Noctuidae
- Genus: Thiacidas
- Species: T. leonie

Binomial name
- Thiacidas leonie Hacker & Zilli, 2007

Species of moth

Thiacidas leonie is a moth of the family Noctuidae. It is found in Ethiopia and Tanzania.
