= Usta wallengrenii =

Scientific classification
- Kingdom: Animalia
- Phylum: Arthropoda
- Clade: Pancrustacea
- Class: Insecta
- Order: Lepidoptera
- Family: Saturniidae
- Genus: Usta
- Species: U. wallengrenii

Binomial name
- Usta wallengrenii (C. Felder & R. Felder, 1859)

Synonyms
- Saturnia wallengrenii C. & R. Felder, 1859; Heniocha terpsichorina Westwood, 1881

Species of moth

Usta wallengrenii is a species of moth in the family Saturniidae. It is found in Ethiopia, Kenya, Namibia and South Africa.
