= Usta grantae =

Scientific classification
- Domain: Eukaryota
- Kingdom: Animalia
- Phylum: Arthropoda
- Class: Insecta
- Order: Lepidoptera
- Family: Saturniidae
- Genus: Usta
- Species: U. grantae

Binomial name
- Usta grantae Terral & Lequeux, 1991

Species of moth

Usta grantae is a species of moth in the family Saturniidae. It is found in Tanzania.
