= Crambus harrisi =

Scientific classification
- Kingdom: Animalia
- Phylum: Arthropoda
- Clade: Pancrustacea
- Class: Insecta
- Order: Lepidoptera
- Family: Crambidae
- Genus: Crambus
- Species: C. harrisi

Binomial name
- Crambus harrisi Klots, 1967

Species of moth

Crambus harrisi is a moth in the family Crambidae. It was described by Alexander Barrett Klots in 1967. It is found in North America, where it has been recorded from New Mexico and Texas.

The length of the forewings is about 11.8 mm for males and 10.4 mm for females.
