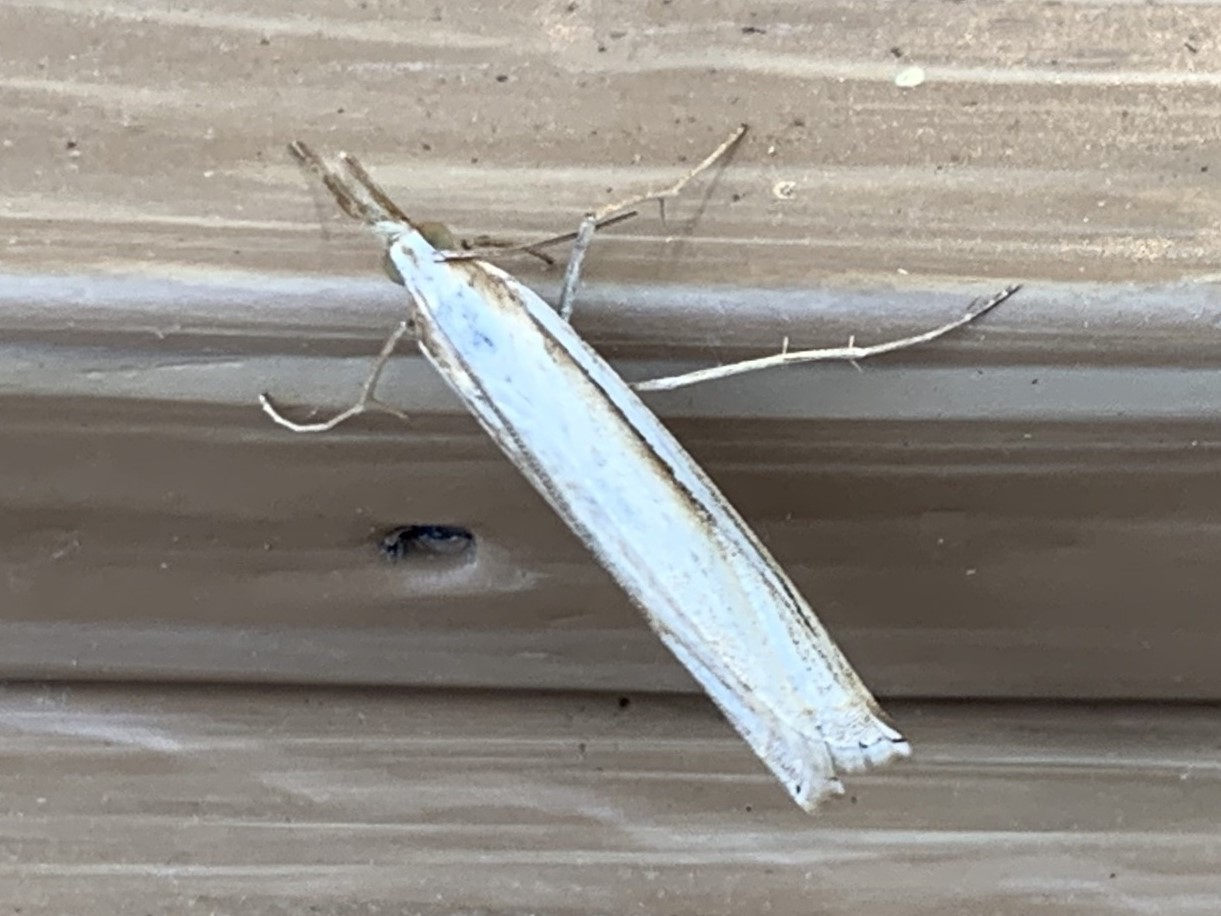

Scientific classification
- Kingdom: Animalia
- Phylum: Arthropoda
- Clade: Pancrustacea
- Class: Insecta
- Order: Lepidoptera
- Family: Crambidae
- Genus: Crambus
- Species: C. sargentellus

Binomial name
- Crambus sargentellus Klots, 1942

= Crambus sargentellus =

Species of moth

Crambus sargentellus is a species of moth in the family Crambidae. It was first described by Alexander Barrett Klots in 1942. It is found in the US states of Arizona and New Mexico.

The length of the forewings is 13-17.3 mm.
