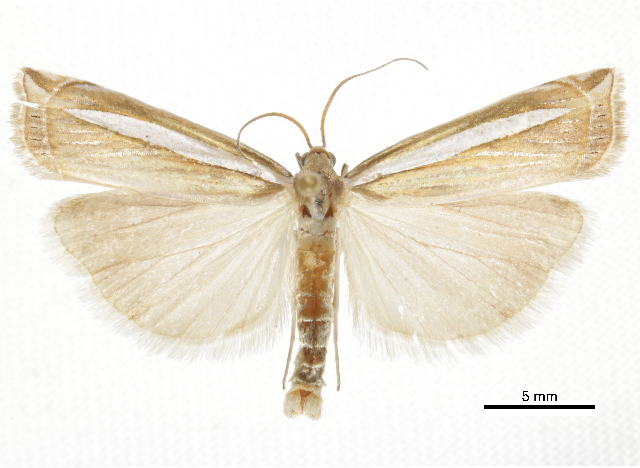

Scientific classification
- Kingdom: Animalia
- Phylum: Arthropoda
- Clade: Pancrustacea
- Class: Insecta
- Order: Lepidoptera
- Family: Crambidae
- Genus: Crambus
- Species: C. johnsoni

Binomial name
- Crambus johnsoni Klots, 1942

= Crambus johnsoni =

Species of moth

Crambus johnsoni is a moth in the family Crambidae. It was described by Alexander Barrett Klots in 1942. It is found in the US states of New Mexico and Arizona.

The length of the forewings is 12–15 mm.
