= Crambus sperryellus =

Scientific classification
- Kingdom: Animalia
- Phylum: Arthropoda
- Clade: Pancrustacea
- Class: Insecta
- Order: Lepidoptera
- Family: Crambidae
- Genus: Crambus
- Species: C. sperryellus

Binomial name
- Crambus sperryellus Klots, 1940

Species of moth

Crambus sperryellus is a moth in the family Crambidae. It was described by Alexander Barrett Klots in 1940. It is found in the US states of California and adjacent Arizona.
