= Crambus ainslieellus =

Scientific classification
- Kingdom: Animalia
- Phylum: Arthropoda
- Clade: Pancrustacea
- Class: Insecta
- Order: Lepidoptera
- Family: Crambidae
- Genus: Crambus
- Species: C. ainslieellus

Binomial name
- Crambus ainslieellus Klots, 1942

Synonyms
- Crambus ainsliellus

Species of moth

Crambus ainslieellus is a moth in the family Crambidae. It was described by Alexander Barrett Klots in 1942. It is found in North America, where it has been recorded from Alberta, British Columbia, Manitoba, Washington, Montana, South Dakota, Iowa and Maine. The habitat consists of grassland areas.

The wingspan is 21–29 mm. Adults are on wing from August to September.

The larvae probably feed on grass roots.
