= Thersites (disambiguation) =

Thersites was a common Greek soldier in the Iliad who was physically beaten in assembly for insubordination. Thersites may also be:

- Thersites (gastropod), a genus of snails
- Megasoma thersites, a species of scarab beetle
- 1868 Thersites, an asteroid
- Crambus thersites, a species of moth
- Thersites at the bar, a nickname of Luther Martin for his rebelliousness in assembly
