= Crambus bigelovi =

Scientific classification
- Kingdom: Animalia
- Phylum: Arthropoda
- Clade: Pancrustacea
- Class: Insecta
- Order: Lepidoptera
- Family: Crambidae
- Genus: Crambus
- Species: C. bigelovi

Binomial name
- Crambus bigelovi Klots, 1967

Species of moth

Crambus bigelovi is a moth in the family Crambidae. It was described by Alexander Barrett Klots in 1967. It is found in North America, where it has been recorded from New Mexico and Wyoming.
