= Crambus sanfordellus =

Scientific classification
- Kingdom: Animalia
- Phylum: Arthropoda
- Clade: Pancrustacea
- Class: Insecta
- Order: Lepidoptera
- Family: Crambidae
- Genus: Crambus
- Species: C. sanfordellus

Binomial name
- Crambus sanfordellus Klots, 1942

Species of moth

Crambus sanfordellus is a moth in the family Crambidae. It was described by Alexander Barrett Klots in 1942. It is found in the US state of Florida.

The length of the forewings is about 11.6 mm.

== Etymology ==
The species is named for Mr. L. J. Sanford, one of the species collectors.
