= Crambus watsonellus =

Scientific classification
- Kingdom: Animalia
- Phylum: Arthropoda
- Clade: Pancrustacea
- Class: Insecta
- Order: Lepidoptera
- Family: Crambidae
- Genus: Crambus
- Species: C. watsonellus

Binomial name
- Crambus watsonellus Klots, 1942

Species of moth

Crambus watsonellus, or Watson's grass-veneer, is a moth in the family Crambidae. It was described by Alexander Barrett Klots in 1942. It is found in North America, where it has been recorded from Florida, Illinois, Maine, Michigan, Ohio, Oklahoma and Ontario. The habitat consists of marshy areas.
