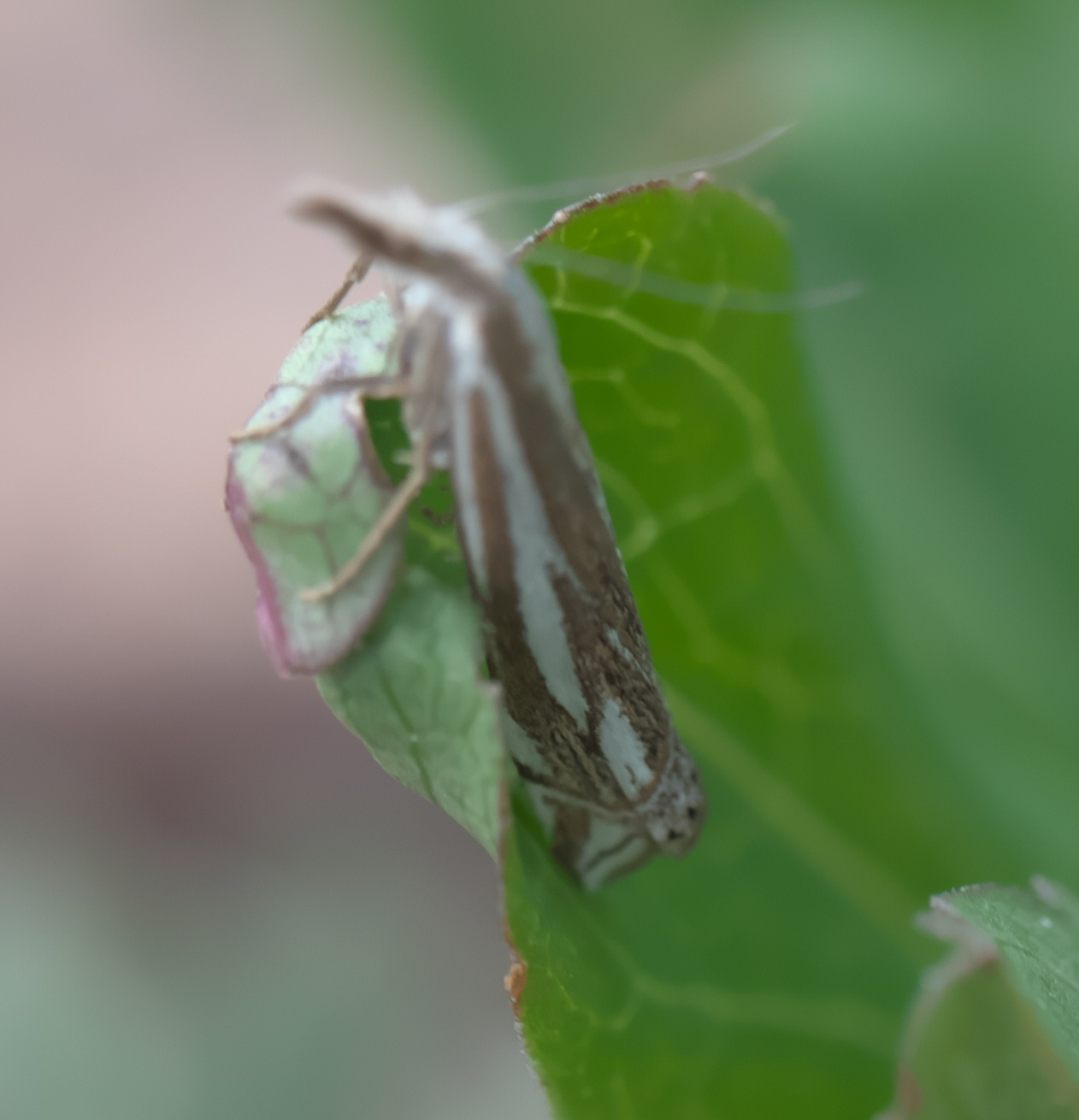

Scientific classification
- Kingdom: Animalia
- Phylum: Arthropoda
- Clade: Pancrustacea
- Class: Insecta
- Order: Lepidoptera
- Family: Crambidae
- Genus: Crambus
- Species: C. whitmerellus

Binomial name
- Crambus whitmerellus Klots, 1942

= Crambus whitmerellus =

Species of moth

Crambus whitmerellus, or Whitmer's grass-veneer, is a moth in the family Crambidae. It was described by Alexander Barrett Klots in 1942. It has been recorded in North America from Alberta, Montana, Wyoming, Colorado and Utah. The habitat consists of grasslands.

The larvae probably feed on grasses.

== Subspecies ==
- Crambus whitmerellus whitmerellus
- Crambus whitmerellus browni Klots, 1942 (Alberta, northern Montana)
