= Crambus richteri =

Scientific classification
- Kingdom: Animalia
- Phylum: Arthropoda
- Clade: Pancrustacea
- Class: Insecta
- Order: Lepidoptera
- Family: Crambidae
- Genus: Crambus
- Species: C. richteri

Binomial name
- Crambus richteri Błeszyński, 1963

Species of moth

Crambus richteri is a moth of the family Crambidae. It is found in Ethiopia.

Externally this species is very similar to Crambus archimedes from South Africa and the author did not exclude that it is a geographical subspecies of same.
