= Crambus cyrilellus =

Scientific classification
- Kingdom: Animalia
- Phylum: Arthropoda
- Clade: Pancrustacea
- Class: Insecta
- Order: Lepidoptera
- Family: Crambidae
- Genus: Crambus
- Species: C. cyrilellus

Binomial name
- Crambus cyrilellus Klots, 1942

Species of moth

Crambus cyrilellus is a moth in the family Crambidae. It was described by Alexander Barrett Klots in 1942. It is found in North America, where it has been recorded from Arizona, Colorado, New Mexico, Texas and Utah.

The length of the forewings is 9.5–11 mm. Adults have been recorded on wing in May and July.
