= Crambus braunellus =

Scientific classification
- Kingdom: Animalia
- Phylum: Arthropoda
- Clade: Pancrustacea
- Class: Insecta
- Order: Lepidoptera
- Family: Crambidae
- Genus: Crambus
- Species: C. braunellus

Binomial name
- Crambus braunellus Klots, 1940

Species of moth

Crambus braunellus is a moth in the family Crambidae. It was described by Alexander Barrett Klots in 1940. It is found in North America, where it has been recorded from California and Maryland.
