= Crambus pseudargyrophorus =

Scientific classification
- Kingdom: Animalia
- Phylum: Arthropoda
- Clade: Pancrustacea
- Class: Insecta
- Order: Lepidoptera
- Family: Crambidae
- Genus: Crambus
- Species: C. pseudargyrophorus

Binomial name
- Crambus pseudargyrophorus Okano, 1960

Species of moth

Crambus pseudargyrophorus is a moth in the family Crambidae. It was described by Okano in 1960. It is found in Japan.
