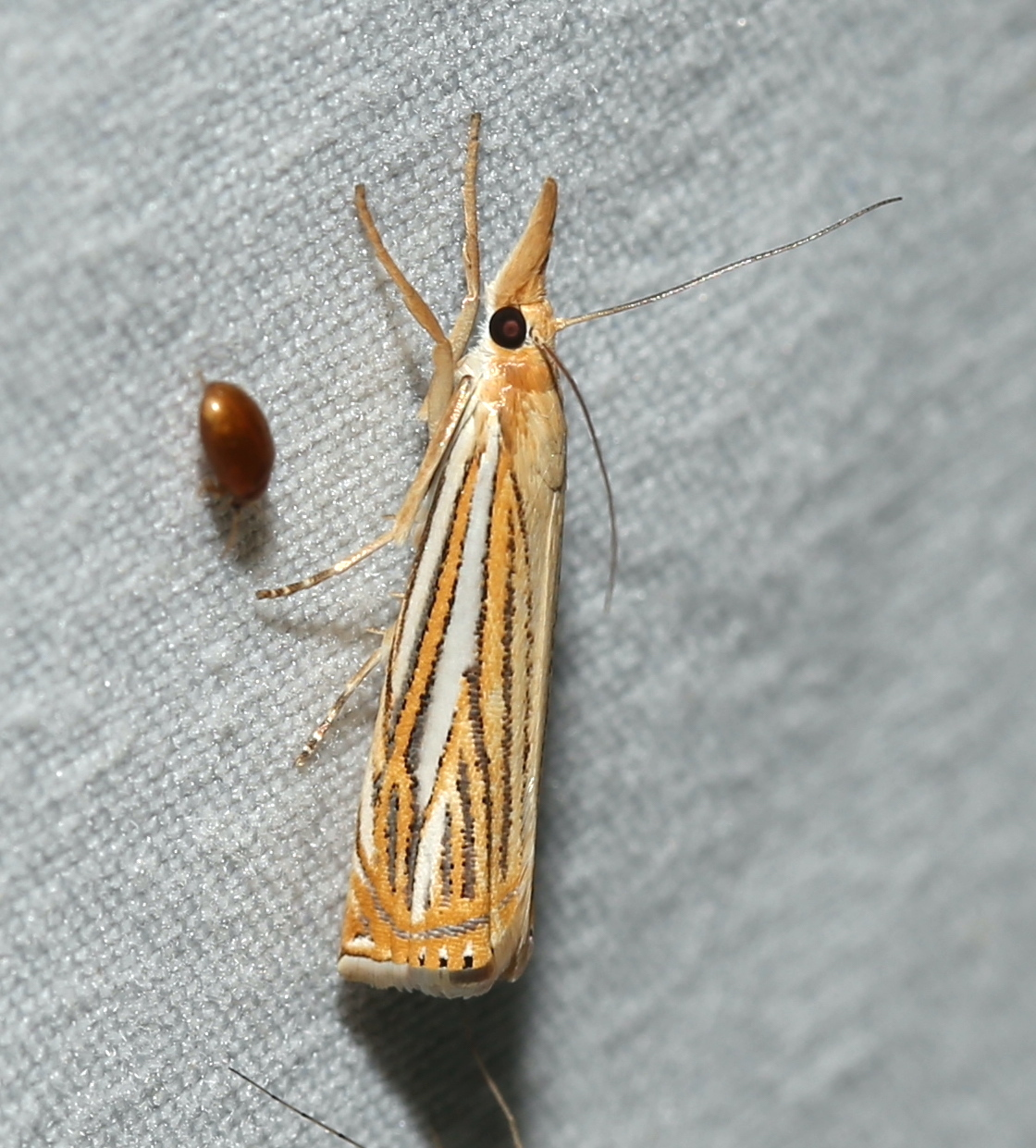

Scientific classification
- Kingdom: Animalia
- Phylum: Arthropoda
- Clade: Pancrustacea
- Class: Insecta
- Order: Lepidoptera
- Family: Crambidae
- Genus: Crambus
- Species: C. multilinellus

Binomial name
- Crambus multilinellus Fernald, 1887

= Crambus multilinellus =

Species of moth

Crambus multilinellus, the multinellus grass-veneer, is a moth in the family Crambidae. It was described by Charles H. Fernald in 1887. It is found in North America, where it has been recorded from Florida, Georgia, Illinois, Maryland, Minnesota, Mississippi, North Carolina, Ontario and South Carolina.

The wingspan is 20–22 mm. Adults are on wing from March to September.

The larvae feed on Gramineae species.
