= Crambus paris =

Scientific classification
- Kingdom: Animalia
- Phylum: Arthropoda
- Clade: Pancrustacea
- Class: Insecta
- Order: Lepidoptera
- Family: Crambidae
- Genus: Crambus
- Species: C. paris

Binomial name
- Crambus paris Bassi, 2012

Species of moth

Crambus paris is a moth in the family Crambidae. It was described by Graziano Bassi in 2012. It is found in South Africa, where it has been recorded from KwaZulu-Natal.
