= Crambus tutillus =

Scientific classification
- Kingdom: Animalia
- Phylum: Arthropoda
- Clade: Pancrustacea
- Class: Insecta
- Order: Lepidoptera
- Family: Crambidae
- Genus: Crambus
- Species: C. tutillus

Binomial name
- Crambus tutillus McDunnough, 1921

Species of moth

Crambus tutillus is a moth in the family Crambidae. It was described by James Halliday McDunnough in 1921. It is found in North America, where it has been recorded from British Columbia and Oregon.
