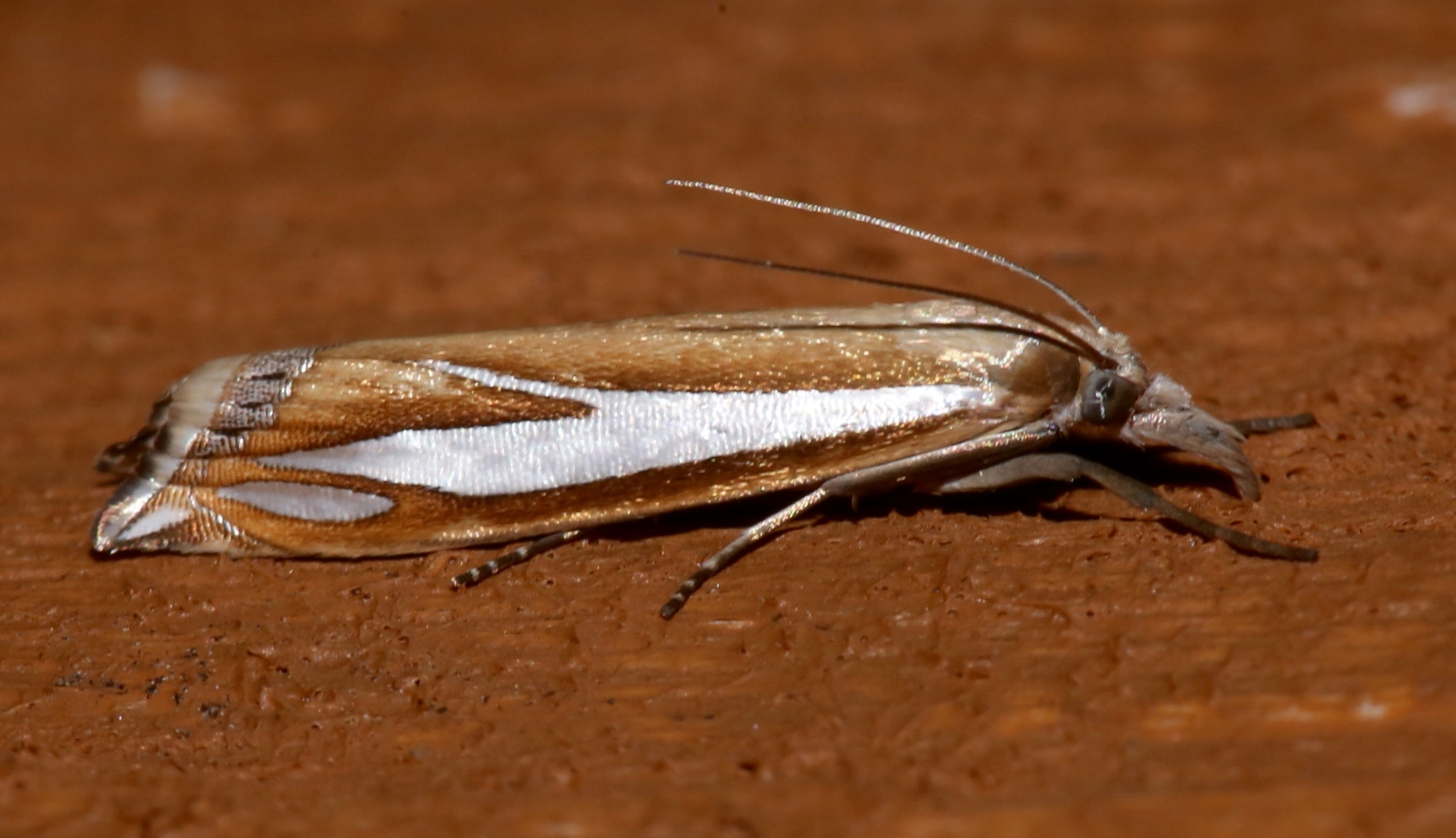

Scientific classification
- Kingdom: Animalia
- Phylum: Arthropoda
- Clade: Pancrustacea
- Class: Insecta
- Order: Lepidoptera
- Family: Crambidae
- Genus: Crambus
- Species: C. satrapellus

Binomial name
- Crambus satrapellus (Zincken, 1821)

Synonyms
- Chilo satrapellus Zincken, 1821; Crambus aculiellus Hampson, 1896; Crambus aculeilellus Walker, 1863; Crambus aureorufus Hampson, 1919; Crambus elegantellus Walker, 1863

= Crambus satrapellus =

Species of moth

Crambus satrapellus is a moth in the family Crambidae. It was described by Zincken in 1821. It is found from the United States (Alabama, Florida, Georgia, Louisiana, Maryland, Michigan, Ohio, South Carolina and Texas) to Brazil.

Adults are on wing from July to September in most of North America, but year-round in Florida.
