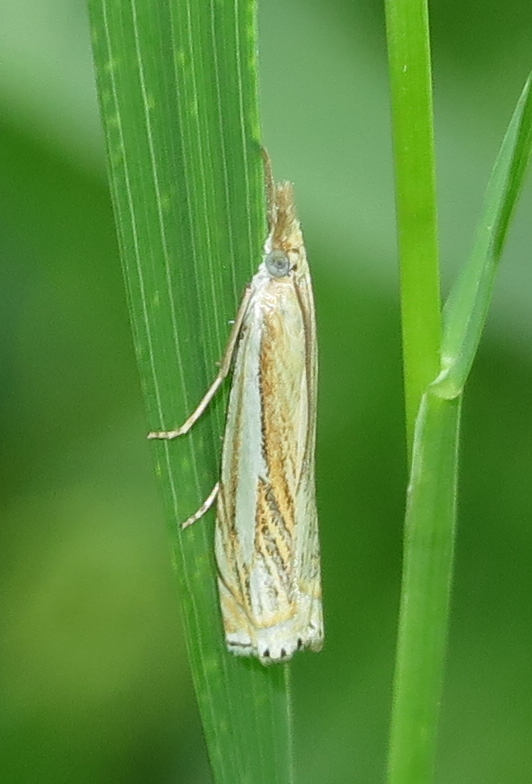

Scientific classification
- Kingdom: Animalia
- Phylum: Arthropoda
- Clade: Pancrustacea
- Class: Insecta
- Order: Lepidoptera
- Family: Crambidae
- Genus: Crambus
- Species: C. saltuellus

Binomial name
- Crambus saltuellus Zeller, 1863

= Crambus saltuellus =

Species of moth

Crambus saltuellus, the pasture grass-veneer, is a moth in the family Crambidae. It was described by Philipp Christoph Zeller in 1863. It is found in North America, where it has been recorded from the north-eastern United States south to North Carolina. It is also present in southern Ontario.

The wingspan is about 22 mm.

The larvae feed on various grasses.
