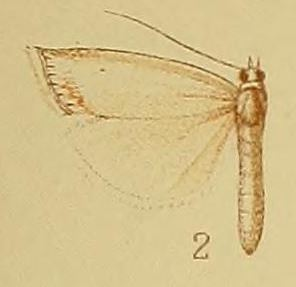
- Crambus sectitermina Hampson, 1910

Scientific classification
- Kingdom: Animalia
- Phylum: Arthropoda
- Clade: Pancrustacea
- Class: Insecta
- Order: Lepidoptera
- Family: Crambidae
- Genus: Crambus
- Species: C. sectitermina

Binomial name
- Crambus sectitermina Hampson, 1910

= Crambus sectitermina =

Species of moth

Crambus sectitermina is a moth in the family Crambidae. It was described by George Hampson in 1910. It is found in Zambia and Zimbabwe.
