= Crambus cypridalis =

Scientific classification
- Kingdom: Animalia
- Phylum: Arthropoda
- Clade: Pancrustacea
- Class: Insecta
- Order: Lepidoptera
- Family: Crambidae
- Genus: Crambus
- Species: C. cypridalis

Binomial name
- Crambus cypridalis Hulst, 1886

Species of moth

Crambus cypridalis is a moth in the family Crambidae. It was described by George Duryea Hulst in 1886. It is found in North America, where it has been recorded from California, Colorado, Montana, New Mexico and Washington.

The wingspan is about 28 mm. Adults are on wing from June to November.

The larvae likely feed on grasses.
