= Crambus tenuistriga =

Scientific classification
- Kingdom: Animalia
- Phylum: Arthropoda
- Clade: Pancrustacea
- Class: Insecta
- Order: Lepidoptera
- Family: Crambidae
- Genus: Crambus
- Species: C. tenuistriga

Binomial name
- Crambus tenuistriga Hampson, 1896

Species of moth

Crambus tenuistriga is a moth in the family Crambidae. It was described by George Hampson in 1896. It is found in Lesotho and Gauteng, South Africa.
