= Crambus patulellus =

Scientific classification
- Kingdom: Animalia
- Phylum: Arthropoda
- Clade: Pancrustacea
- Class: Insecta
- Order: Lepidoptera
- Family: Crambidae
- Genus: Crambus
- Species: C. patulellus

Binomial name
- Crambus patulellus Walker, 1863

Species of moth

Crambus patulellus is a moth in the family Crambidae. It was described by Francis Walker in 1863. It is found in Rio de Janeiro, Brazil.
