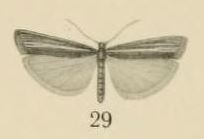

Scientific classification
- Kingdom: Animalia
- Phylum: Arthropoda
- Clade: Pancrustacea
- Class: Insecta
- Order: Lepidoptera
- Family: Crambidae
- Genus: Crambus
- Species: C. sjoestedti

Binomial name
- Crambus sjoestedti Aurivillius, 1910

Synonyms
- Crambus sjostedti Vári, Kroon & Krüger, 2002

= Crambus sjoestedti =

Species of moth

Crambus sjoestedti is a moth in the family Crambidae. It was described by Per Olof Christopher Aurivillius in 1910. It is found in Kenya, South Africa, Sudan and Tanzania.
