= Crambus coccophthorus =

Scientific classification
- Kingdom: Animalia
- Phylum: Arthropoda
- Clade: Pancrustacea
- Class: Insecta
- Order: Lepidoptera
- Family: Crambidae
- Genus: Crambus
- Species: C. coccophthorus

Binomial name
- Crambus coccophthorus Błeszyński, 1962

Species of moth

Crambus coccophthorus is a moth in the family Crambidae. It was described by Stanisław Błeszyński in 1962. It is found in Jamaica.
