= Neodactria glenni =

Scientific classification
- Kingdom: Animalia
- Phylum: Arthropoda
- Clade: Pancrustacea
- Class: Insecta
- Order: Lepidoptera
- Family: Crambidae
- Subfamily: Crambinae
- Tribe: Crambini
- Genus: Neodactria
- Species: N. glenni

Binomial name
- Neodactria glenni Landry & Klots in Landry & Metzler, 2002

Species of moth

Neodactria glenni is a moth in the family Crambidae. It was described by Bernard Landry and Alexander Barrett Klots in 2002. It is found in North America, where it has been recorded from central and east-central Missouri, upper central Illinois and eastern Mississippi. The habitat consists of prairies.
