= Crambus nolckeniellus =

Scientific classification
- Kingdom: Animalia
- Phylum: Arthropoda
- Clade: Pancrustacea
- Class: Insecta
- Order: Lepidoptera
- Family: Crambidae
- Genus: Crambus
- Species: C. nolckeniellus

Binomial name
- Crambus nolckeniellus Zeller, 1872

Synonyms
- Crambus nolkeniellus Hampson, 1896

Species of moth

Crambus nolckeniellus is a moth in the family Crambidae. It was described by Zeller in 1872. It is found in Colombia.
