= Crambus angulatus =

Scientific classification
- Kingdom: Animalia
- Phylum: Arthropoda
- Clade: Pancrustacea
- Class: Insecta
- Order: Lepidoptera
- Family: Crambidae
- Genus: Crambus
- Species: C. angulatus

Binomial name
- Crambus angulatus Barnes & McDunnough, 1918

Synonyms
- Crambus diegonellus Dyar, 1923; Agriphila angulatus

Species of moth

Crambus angulatus is a moth of the family Crambidae first described by William Barnes and James Halliday McDunnough in 1918. It is found in North America, including California.
