= Crambus occidentalis =

Scientific classification
- Kingdom: Animalia
- Phylum: Arthropoda
- Clade: Pancrustacea
- Class: Insecta
- Order: Lepidoptera
- Family: Crambidae
- Genus: Crambus
- Species: C. occidentalis

Binomial name
- Crambus occidentalis Grote, 1880

Synonyms
- Crambus agricolellus Dyar, 1923

Species of moth

Crambus occidentalis is a moth in the family Crambidae. It was described by Augustus Radcliffe Grote in 1880. It is found in North America, where it has been recorded from Alberta and California.
