= Crambus leucoschalis =

Scientific classification
- Kingdom: Animalia
- Phylum: Arthropoda
- Clade: Pancrustacea
- Class: Insecta
- Order: Lepidoptera
- Family: Crambidae
- Genus: Crambus
- Species: C. leucoschalis

Binomial name
- Crambus leucoschalis Hampson, 1898

Synonyms
- Crambus infradentatus Hampson, 1919

Species of moth

Crambus leucoschalis is a moth in the family Crambidae. It was described by George Hampson in 1898. It is found in South Africa, where it has been recorded from Gauteng.
