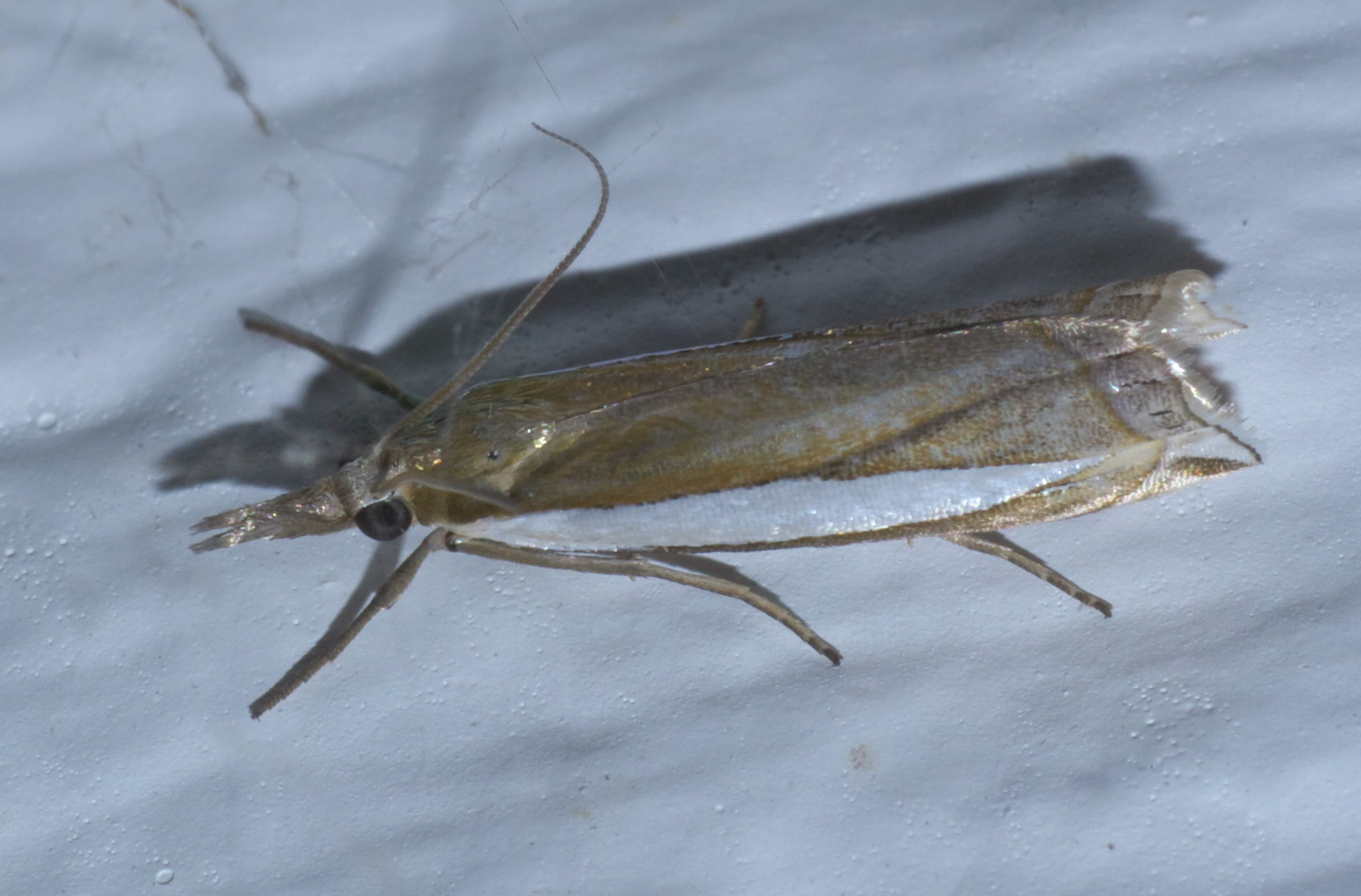

Scientific classification
- Kingdom: Animalia
- Phylum: Arthropoda
- Clade: Pancrustacea
- Class: Insecta
- Order: Lepidoptera
- Family: Crambidae
- Genus: Crambus
- Species: C. leachellus

Binomial name
- Crambus leachellus (Zincken, 1818)

Synonyms
- Chilo leachellus Zincken, 1818; Crambus hastiferellus Walker, 1863; Crambus lativittellus Zeller, 1863; Crambus pulchellus Zeller, 1863

= Crambus leachellus =

Species of moth

Crambus leachellus, or Leach's grass-veneer, is a moth in the family Crambidae. It was described by Johann Leopold Theodor Friedrich Zincken in 1818. It is found in North America, where it has been recorded from Ontario and Maryland to Florida, west to California and Oregon. The habitat consists of grasslands and meadows.

The wingspan is 25–27 mm. Adults are on wing from May to September in two to four generations per year.

The larvae feed on grasses.
