= Crambus hampsoni =

Scientific classification
- Kingdom: Animalia
- Phylum: Arthropoda
- Clade: Pancrustacea
- Class: Insecta
- Order: Lepidoptera
- Family: Crambidae
- Genus: Crambus
- Species: C. hampsoni

Binomial name
- Crambus hampsoni Błeszyński, 1961

Synonyms
- Crambus mediofasciellus Hampson, 1919 (preocc.)

Species of moth

Crambus hampsoni is a moth in the family Crambidae. It was described by Stanisław Błeszyński in 1961. It is endemic to Kenya.
