= Crambus gausapalis =

Scientific classification
- Kingdom: Animalia
- Phylum: Arthropoda
- Clade: Pancrustacea
- Class: Insecta
- Order: Lepidoptera
- Family: Crambidae
- Genus: Crambus
- Species: C. gausapalis

Binomial name
- Crambus gausapalis Hulst, 1886

Species of moth

Crambus gausapalis is a moth in the family Crambidae. It was described by George Duryea Hulst in 1886. It is found in North America, where it has been recorded in California.
