= Crambus dimidiatellus =

Scientific classification
- Kingdom: Animalia
- Phylum: Arthropoda
- Clade: Pancrustacea
- Class: Insecta
- Order: Lepidoptera
- Family: Crambidae
- Genus: Crambus
- Species: C. dimidiatellus

Binomial name
- Crambus dimidiatellus Grote, 1883

Synonyms
- Crambus leucorhabdon Hampson, 1919

Species of moth

Crambus dimidiatellus is a moth in the family Crambidae. It was described by Augustus Radcliffe Grote in 1883. It is found in North America, where it has been recorded from New Mexico, Arizona and Colorado.
