= Crambus xonorus =

Scientific classification
- Kingdom: Animalia
- Phylum: Arthropoda
- Clade: Pancrustacea
- Class: Insecta
- Order: Lepidoptera
- Family: Crambidae
- Genus: Crambus
- Species: C. xonorus

Binomial name
- Crambus xonorus Błeszyński, 1963

Species of moth

Crambus xonorus is a moth in the family Crambidae. It was described by Stanisław Błeszyński in 1963. It is found in the Democratic Republic of the Congo.
