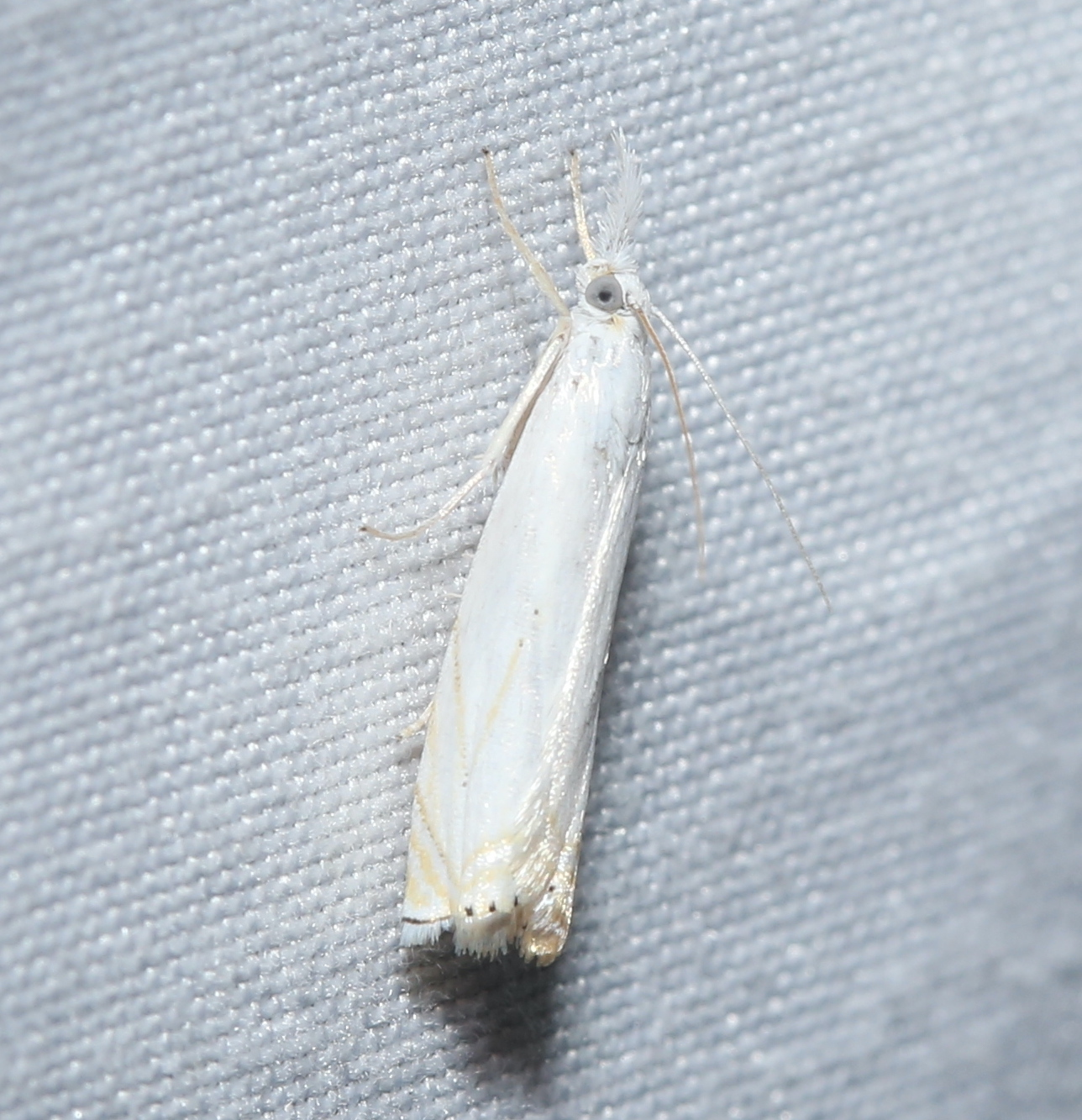

Scientific classification
- Kingdom: Animalia
- Phylum: Arthropoda
- Clade: Pancrustacea
- Class: Insecta
- Order: Lepidoptera
- Family: Crambidae
- Genus: Crambus
- Species: C. albellus

Binomial name
- Crambus albellus Clemens, 1860

= Crambus albellus =

Species of moth

Crambus albellus, the small white grass-veneer, is a moth in the family Crambidae. It was first described by James Brackenridge Clemens in 1860. It is found in North America, where sightings have been recorded from Quebec and Ontario to North Carolina and Tennessee, west to Illinois and Wisconsin.

Adults are on wing from June to September.

The larvae feed on grasses.
