= Crambus tenuis =

Scientific classification
- Kingdom: Animalia
- Phylum: Arthropoda
- Clade: Pancrustacea
- Class: Insecta
- Order: Lepidoptera
- Family: Crambidae
- Genus: Crambus
- Species: C. tenuis

Binomial name
- Crambus tenuis Bassi, 1992

Species of moth

Crambus tenuis is a moth in the family Crambidae. It was described by Graziano Bassi in 1992. It is found in Cameroon.
