= Crambus vittiterminellus =

Scientific classification
- Kingdom: Animalia
- Phylum: Arthropoda
- Clade: Pancrustacea
- Class: Insecta
- Order: Lepidoptera
- Family: Crambidae
- Genus: Crambus
- Species: C. vittiterminellus

Binomial name
- Crambus vittiterminellus Hampson, 1919

Species of moth

Crambus vittiterminellus is a moth in the family Crambidae. It was described by George Hampson in 1919. It is found in Malawi.
