= Crambus okinawanus =

Scientific classification
- Kingdom: Animalia
- Phylum: Arthropoda
- Clade: Pancrustacea
- Class: Insecta
- Order: Lepidoptera
- Family: Crambidae
- Genus: Crambus
- Species: C. okinawanus

Binomial name
- Crambus okinawanus Inoue, 1982

Species of moth

Crambus okinawanus is a moth in the family Crambidae. It was described by Inoue in 1982. It is found in Japan.
