= Crambus sudanicola =

Scientific classification
- Kingdom: Animalia
- Phylum: Arthropoda
- Clade: Pancrustacea
- Class: Insecta
- Order: Lepidoptera
- Family: Crambidae
- Genus: Crambus
- Species: C. sudanicola

Binomial name
- Crambus sudanicola Strand, 1915

Species of moth

Crambus sudanicola is a moth in the family Crambidae. It was described by Strand in 1915. It is found in Sudan.
