= Crambus sinicolellus =

Scientific classification
- Kingdom: Animalia
- Phylum: Arthropoda
- Clade: Pancrustacea
- Class: Insecta
- Order: Lepidoptera
- Family: Crambidae
- Genus: Crambus
- Species: C. sinicolellus

Binomial name
- Crambus sinicolellus Caradja, 1926

Species of moth

Crambus sinicolellus is a moth in the family Crambidae. It was described by Aristide Caradja in 1926. It is found in Jiangsu, China.
