= Crambus averroellus =

Scientific classification
- Kingdom: Animalia
- Phylum: Arthropoda
- Clade: Pancrustacea
- Class: Insecta
- Order: Lepidoptera
- Family: Crambidae
- Genus: Crambus
- Species: C. averroellus

Binomial name
- Crambus averroellus Bassi, 1990

Species of moth

Crambus averroellus is a moth in the family Crambidae. It was described by Graziano Bassi in 1990. It is found in Saudi Arabia.
