= Crambus puccinii =

Scientific classification
- Kingdom: Animalia
- Phylum: Arthropoda
- Clade: Pancrustacea
- Class: Insecta
- Order: Lepidoptera
- Family: Crambidae
- Genus: Crambus
- Species: C. puccinii

Binomial name
- Crambus puccinii Bassi, 2000

Species of moth

Crambus puccinii is a moth in the family Crambidae. It was described by Graziano Bassi in 2000. It is found in Sudan.
