= Crambus sibirica =

Scientific classification
- Kingdom: Animalia
- Phylum: Arthropoda
- Clade: Pancrustacea
- Class: Insecta
- Order: Lepidoptera
- Family: Crambidae
- Genus: Crambus
- Species: C. sibirica

Binomial name
- Crambus sibirica Alphéraky, 1897

Synonyms
- Crambus pratellus var. sibirica Alphéraky, 1897; Crambus hayachinensis Okano, 1957

Species of moth

Crambus sibirica is a moth in the family Crambidae. It was described by Sergei Alphéraky in 1897. It is found in the Russian Far East and Japan.
