= Crambus kumatakellus =

Scientific classification
- Kingdom: Animalia
- Phylum: Arthropoda
- Clade: Pancrustacea
- Class: Insecta
- Order: Lepidoptera
- Family: Crambidae
- Genus: Crambus
- Species: C. kumatakellus

Binomial name
- Crambus kumatakellus Shibuya, 1928

Synonyms
- Crambus hyacinthus Bleszynski, 1961

Species of moth

Crambus kumatakellus is a moth in the family Crambidae. It was described by Shibuya in 1928. It is found in Taiwan.
