= Crambus sapidus =

Scientific classification
- Kingdom: Animalia
- Phylum: Arthropoda
- Clade: Pancrustacea
- Class: Insecta
- Order: Lepidoptera
- Family: Crambidae
- Genus: Crambus
- Species: C. sapidus

Binomial name
- Crambus sapidus Błeszyński, 1967

Species of moth

Crambus sapidus is a moth in the family Crambidae. It was described by Stanisław Błeszyński in 1967. It is found in Suriname.
