= Crambus angustexon =

Scientific classification
- Kingdom: Animalia
- Phylum: Arthropoda
- Clade: Pancrustacea
- Class: Insecta
- Order: Lepidoptera
- Family: Crambidae
- Genus: Crambus
- Species: C. angustexon

Binomial name
- Crambus angustexon Błeszyński, 1962

Species of moth

Crambus angustexon is a moth in the family Crambidae. It was described by Stanisław Błeszyński in 1962. It is found in Mexico.
