= Crambus psychellus =

Scientific classification
- Kingdom: Animalia
- Phylum: Arthropoda
- Clade: Pancrustacea
- Class: Insecta
- Order: Lepidoptera
- Family: Crambidae
- Genus: Crambus
- Species: C. psychellus

Binomial name
- Crambus psychellus Maassen, 1890

Species of moth

Crambus psychellus is a moth in the family Crambidae. It was described by Peter Maassen in 1890. It is found in Ecuador.
