= Crambus alexandrus =

Scientific classification
- Kingdom: Animalia
- Phylum: Arthropoda
- Clade: Pancrustacea
- Class: Insecta
- Order: Lepidoptera
- Family: Crambidae
- Genus: Crambus
- Species: C. alexandrus

Binomial name
- Crambus alexandrus Kirpichnikova, 1979

Species of moth

Crambus alexandrus is a moth in the family Crambidae. It was described by Valentina A. Kirpichnikova in 1979. It is found in Russia (Kuril Islands) and Japan.
