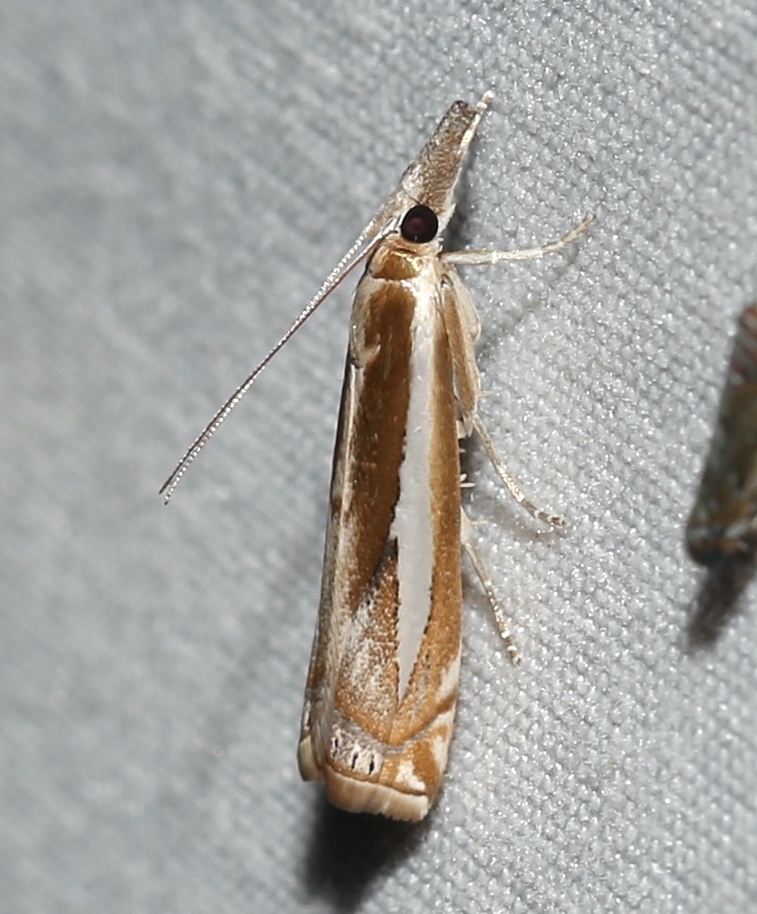

Scientific classification
- Kingdom: Animalia
- Phylum: Arthropoda
- Clade: Pancrustacea
- Class: Insecta
- Order: Lepidoptera
- Family: Crambidae
- Genus: Crambus
- Species: C. praefectellus

Binomial name
- Crambus praefectellus (Zincken, 1821)

Synonyms
- Chilo praefectellus Zincken, 1821; Crambus involutellus Clemens, 1860; Crambus praefectellus oslarellus Haimbach, 1908

= Crambus praefectellus =

Species of moth

Crambus praefectellus, the common grass-veneer or silver-striped webworm, is a moth of the family Crambidae described by Johann Leopold Theodor Friedrich Zincken in 1821. It is found in the United States and southern Canada east of the Rocky Mountains.

The wingspan is 18–25 mm. Adults are on wing from May to September in the north, from April to October in the mid latitudes and probably year round in southern Florida and Texas.

The larvae feed on various grasses and cereal grains.
