= Crambus argyrophorus =

Scientific classification
- Kingdom: Animalia
- Phylum: Arthropoda
- Clade: Pancrustacea
- Class: Insecta
- Order: Lepidoptera
- Family: Crambidae
- Genus: Crambus
- Species: C. argyrophorus

Binomial name
- Crambus argyrophorus Butler, 1878

Species of moth

Crambus argyrophorus is a moth in the family Crambidae. It was described by Arthur Gardiner Butler in 1878. It is found in Japan.

The wingspan is 18–25 mm.
