= Crambus trichusalis =

Scientific classification
- Kingdom: Animalia
- Phylum: Arthropoda
- Clade: Pancrustacea
- Class: Insecta
- Order: Lepidoptera
- Family: Crambidae
- Genus: Crambus
- Species: C. trichusalis

Binomial name
- Crambus trichusalis Hulst, 1886

Species of moth

Crambus trichusalis is a moth in the family Crambidae. It was described by George Duryea Hulst in 1886. It is found in North America, where it has been recorded from Alberta, Saskatchewan, Montana, North Dakota and South Dakota. The habitat consists of grasslands.

The larvae probably feed on grasses.
