= Crambus awemellus =

Scientific classification
- Kingdom: Animalia
- Phylum: Arthropoda
- Clade: Pancrustacea
- Class: Insecta
- Order: Lepidoptera
- Family: Crambidae
- Genus: Crambus
- Species: C. awemellus

Binomial name
- Crambus awemellus McDunnough, 1921

Species of moth

Crambus awemellus is a species of moth in the family Crambidae. It was described by James Halliday McDunnough in 1921. It is found in North America, where it has been recorded from Alberta, Manitoba, Ontario and Quebec. The habitat consists of marl fens.

The larvae probably feed on grasses.
