= Crambus sachaensis =

Scientific classification
- Kingdom: Animalia
- Phylum: Arthropoda
- Clade: Pancrustacea
- Class: Insecta
- Order: Lepidoptera
- Family: Crambidae
- Genus: Crambus
- Species: C. sachaensis

Binomial name
- Crambus sachaensis Ustjuzhanin, 1988

Species of moth

Crambus sachaensis is a moth in the family Crambidae. It was described by Petr Ya. Ustjuzhanin in 1988. It is found in Yakutia, Russia.
