= Crambus guerini =

Scientific classification
- Kingdom: Animalia
- Phylum: Arthropoda
- Clade: Pancrustacea
- Class: Insecta
- Order: Lepidoptera
- Family: Crambidae
- Genus: Crambus
- Species: C. guerini

Binomial name
- Crambus guerini Błeszyński, 1961

Species of moth

Crambus guerini is a moth in the family Crambidae. It was described by Stanisław Błeszyński in 1961. It is found in Malawi and Tanzania.

The species belongs to the subfamily Crambinae, commonly known as grass moths.

Members of this genus are typically associated with grassy habitats, where their larvae feed on various species of grasses.
