= Crambus bipartellus =

Scientific classification
- Kingdom: Animalia
- Phylum: Arthropoda
- Clade: Pancrustacea
- Class: Insecta
- Order: Lepidoptera
- Family: Crambidae
- Genus: Crambus
- Species: C. bipartellus

Binomial name
- Crambus bipartellus South in Leech & South, 1901

Synonyms
- Crambus bipartitellus Caradja, 1925

Species of moth

Crambus bipartellus is a moth in the family Crambidae. It was described by South in 1901. It is found in China (Sichuan).
