= Crambus coryolanus =

Scientific classification
- Kingdom: Animalia
- Phylum: Arthropoda
- Clade: Pancrustacea
- Class: Insecta
- Order: Lepidoptera
- Family: Crambidae
- Genus: Crambus
- Species: C. coryolanus

Binomial name
- Crambus coryolanus Błeszyński, 1961

Species of moth

Crambus coryolanus is a moth in the family Crambidae. It was described by Stanisław Błeszyński in 1961. It is found in Darjeeling, India.
