= Crambus bellinii =

Scientific classification
- Kingdom: Animalia
- Phylum: Arthropoda
- Clade: Pancrustacea
- Class: Insecta
- Order: Lepidoptera
- Family: Crambidae
- Genus: Crambus
- Species: C. bellinii

Binomial name
- Crambus bellinii Bassi in Bassi & Trematerra, 2014

Species of moth

Crambus bellinii is a moth in the family Crambidae. It was described by Graziano Bassi in 2014. It is found in Ethiopia.
