= Crambus sparselloides =

Scientific classification
- Kingdom: Animalia
- Phylum: Arthropoda
- Clade: Pancrustacea
- Class: Insecta
- Order: Lepidoptera
- Family: Crambidae
- Genus: Crambus
- Species: C. sparselloides

Binomial name
- Crambus sparselloides Bassi, 1986

Species of moth

Crambus sparselloides is a moth in the family Crambidae. It was described by Graziano Bassi in 1986. It is found in Cameroon, Kenya and Uganda.
