= Crambus boislamberti =

Scientific classification
- Kingdom: Animalia
- Phylum: Arthropoda
- Clade: Pancrustacea
- Class: Insecta
- Order: Lepidoptera
- Family: Crambidae
- Genus: Crambus
- Species: C. boislamberti

Binomial name
- Crambus boislamberti Rougeot, 1977

Species of moth

Crambus boislamberti is a moth in the family Crambidae. It was described by Rougeot in 1977. It is found in Ethiopia.
