= Crambus albifrons =

Scientific classification
- Kingdom: Animalia
- Phylum: Arthropoda
- Clade: Pancrustacea
- Class: Insecta
- Order: Lepidoptera
- Family: Crambidae
- Genus: Crambus
- Species: C. albifrons

Binomial name
- Crambus albifrons Schaus, 1913

Species of moth

Crambus albifrons is a moth in the family Crambidae. It was described by Schaus in 1913. It is found in Costa Rica.
