= Crambus cyrnellus =

Scientific classification
- Kingdom: Animalia
- Phylum: Arthropoda
- Clade: Pancrustacea
- Class: Insecta
- Order: Lepidoptera
- Family: Crambidae
- Genus: Crambus
- Species: C. cyrnellus

Binomial name
- Crambus cyrnellus Schawerda, 1926

Species of moth

Crambus cyrnellus is a species of moth in the family Crambidae. It was described by Karl Schawerda in 1926 and is found on Corsica.
