= Crambus proteus =

Scientific classification
- Kingdom: Animalia
- Phylum: Arthropoda
- Clade: Pancrustacea
- Class: Insecta
- Order: Lepidoptera
- Family: Crambidae
- Genus: Crambus
- Species: C. proteus

Binomial name
- Crambus proteus Bassi & Mey in Mey, 2011

Species of moth

Crambus proteus is a moth in the family Crambidae. It was described by Graziano Bassi and Wolfram Mey in 2011. It is found in South Africa.
