= Crambus kazitaellus =

Scientific classification
- Kingdom: Animalia
- Phylum: Arthropoda
- Clade: Pancrustacea
- Class: Insecta
- Order: Lepidoptera
- Family: Crambidae
- Genus: Crambus
- Species: C. kazitaellus

Binomial name
- Crambus kazitaellus Bassi, 1986

Species of moth

Crambus kazitaellus is a moth in the family Crambidae that is endemic to Kenya. It was described by Graziano Bassi in 1986.
