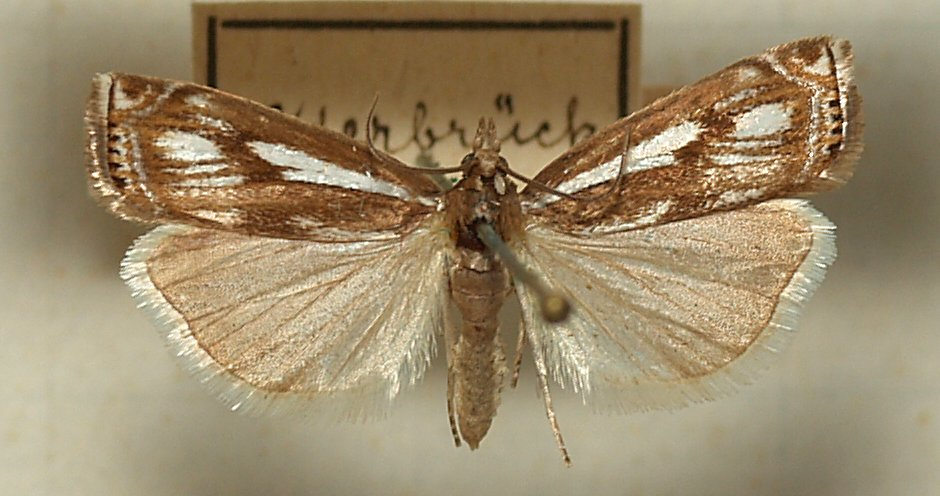

Scientific classification
- Kingdom: Animalia
- Phylum: Arthropoda
- Clade: Pancrustacea
- Class: Insecta
- Order: Lepidoptera
- Family: Crambidae
- Genus: Crambus
- Species: C. alienellus

Binomial name
- Crambus alienellus Zincken, 1817

Synonyms
- Chilo alienellus Germar & Kaulfuss, 1817; Chilo zinckenellus Sodoffsky, 1830; Crambus tigurinellus Duponchel, 1836; Chilo ocellellus Zetterstedt, 1840; Crambus alienellus ab. hemnesensis Strand, 1919; Crambus alienellus ab. ranenensis Strand, 1919; Crambus alienellus dissectus Grote, 1880; Crambus alienellus labradoriensis Christoph, 1858; Crambus moestellus Walker, 1863

= Crambus alienellus =

Species of moth

Crambus alienellus is a species of moth of the family Crambidae. It is found in Northern and Central Europe, Ussuri, Central Asia and Daghestan. Subspecies Crambus alienellus labradoriensis is found in Canada.

The wingspan is 18–22 millimetres (0.71–0.87 in).

== Subspecies ==
- Crambus alienellus alienellus
- Crambus alienellus labradoriensis Christoph, 1858 (Canada)
- Crambus alienellus dissectus Grote, 1880
