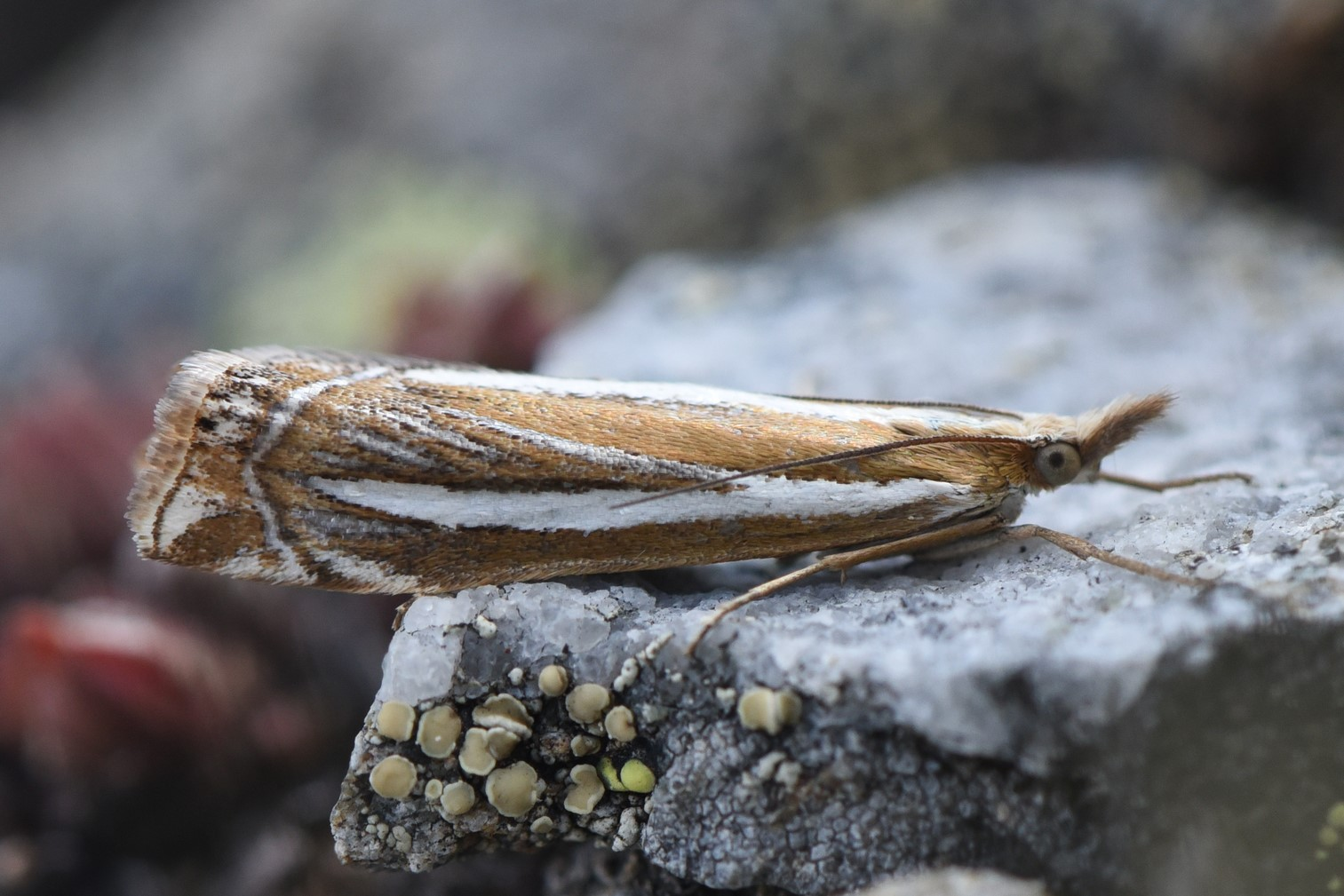

Scientific classification
- Kingdom: Animalia
- Phylum: Arthropoda
- Clade: Pancrustacea
- Class: Insecta
- Order: Lepidoptera
- Family: Crambidae
- Genus: Crambus
- Species: C. cockleellus

Binomial name
- Crambus cockleellus Kearfott, 1908

= Crambus cockleellus =

Species of moth

Crambus cockleellus is a species of moth in the family Crambidae. It was first described by William D. Kearfott in 1908. It is found in North America, where it has been recorded from Alberta and British Columbia.
