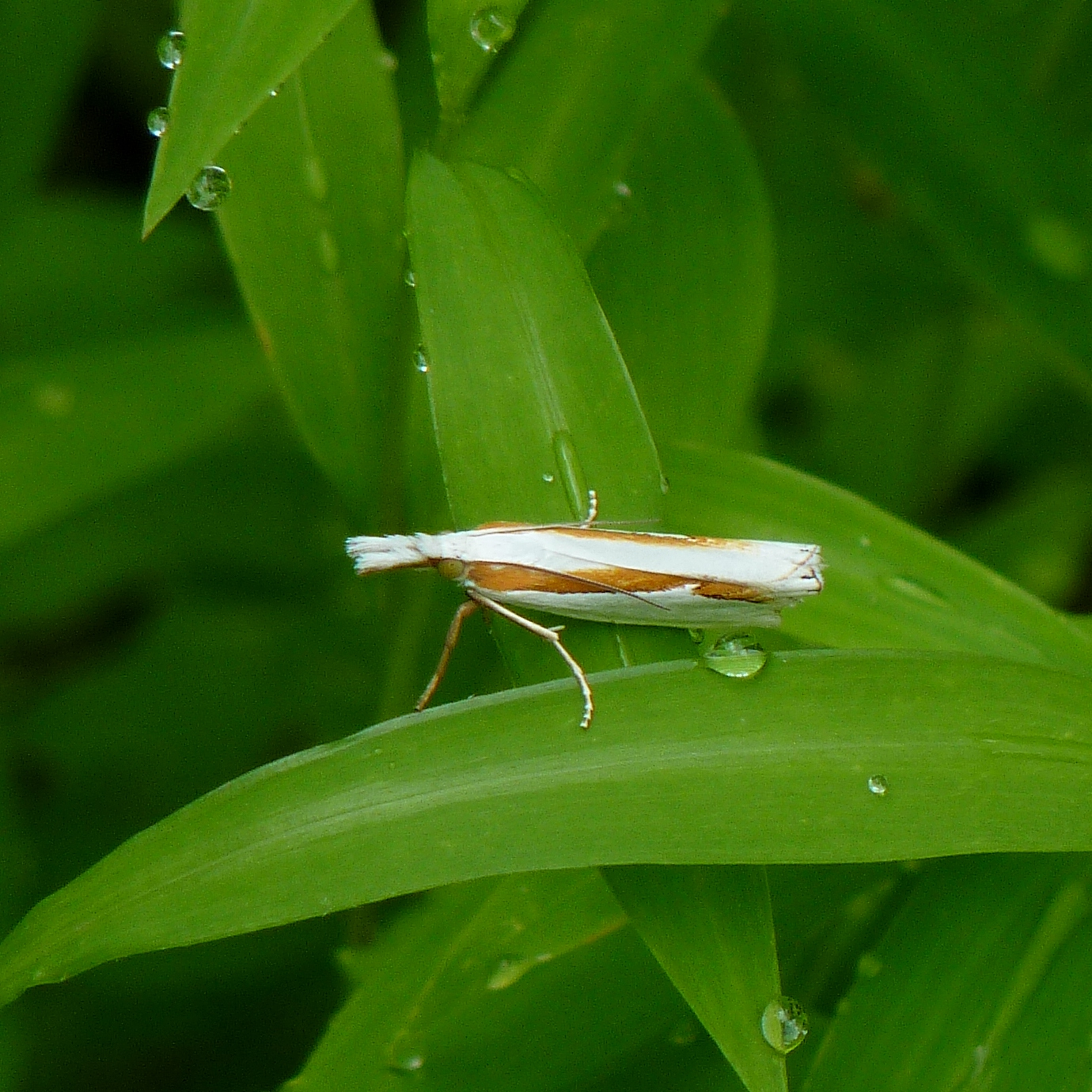

Scientific classification
- Kingdom: Animalia
- Phylum: Arthropoda
- Clade: Pancrustacea
- Class: Insecta
- Order: Lepidoptera
- Family: Crambidae
- Genus: Crambus
- Species: C. girardellus

Binomial name
- Crambus girardellus Clemens, 1860

Synonyms
- Crambus nivihumellus Walker, 1863; Crambus niveihumellus Hampson, 1896

= Crambus girardellus =

Species of moth

Crambus girardellus, or Girard's grass-veneer moth, is a moth in the family Crambidae described by James Brackenridge Clemens in 1860. It is found in North America, including Alberta, Ontario, Quebec, Labrador, Maine, New Hampshire, Massachusetts, New York, Pennsylvania, Maryland, Ohio and Michigan.

The wingspan is 25–28 mm. Adults are on wing in June and July.

The larvae feed on the roots of grass species.
