= Crambus sparsellus =

Scientific classification
- Kingdom: Animalia
- Phylum: Arthropoda
- Clade: Pancrustacea
- Class: Insecta
- Order: Lepidoptera
- Family: Crambidae
- Genus: Crambus
- Species: C. sparsellus

Binomial name
- Crambus sparsellus Walker, 1866

Species of moth

Crambus sparsellus is a moth in the family Crambidae. It was described by Francis Walker in 1866. It is found in South Africa.
