= Crambus magnificus =

Scientific classification
- Kingdom: Animalia
- Phylum: Arthropoda
- Clade: Pancrustacea
- Class: Insecta
- Order: Lepidoptera
- Family: Crambidae
- Genus: Crambus
- Species: C. magnificus

Binomial name
- Crambus magnificus Błeszyński, 1956

Species of moth

Crambus magnificus is a moth in the family Crambidae. It was described by Stanisław Błeszyński in 1956. It is found in Sichuan, China.
