= Crambus claviger =

Scientific classification
- Kingdom: Animalia
- Phylum: Arthropoda
- Clade: Pancrustacea
- Class: Insecta
- Order: Lepidoptera
- Family: Crambidae
- Genus: Crambus
- Species: C. claviger

Binomial name
- Crambus claviger Staudinger, 1899

Species of moth

Crambus claviger is a moth in the family Crambidae. It was described by Otto Staudinger in 1899. It is found in Chile.
