= Crambus prometheus =

Scientific classification
- Kingdom: Animalia
- Phylum: Arthropoda
- Clade: Pancrustacea
- Class: Insecta
- Order: Lepidoptera
- Family: Crambidae
- Genus: Crambus
- Species: C. prometheus

Binomial name
- Crambus prometheus Błeszyński, 1961

Synonyms
- Crambus promethaeus Błeszyński & Collins, 1962

Species of moth

Crambus prometheus is a moth in the family Crambidae. It was described by Stanisław Błeszyński in 1961. It is found in Tanzania.
