= Crambus jupiter =

Scientific classification
- Kingdom: Animalia
- Phylum: Arthropoda
- Clade: Pancrustacea
- Class: Insecta
- Order: Lepidoptera
- Family: Crambidae
- Genus: Crambus
- Species: C. jupiter

Binomial name
- Crambus jupiter Błeszyński, 1963

Species of moth

Crambus jupiter is a moth of the family Crambidae. It is found in Ethiopia.

This species has a length of the forewings of 7.5 mm with a maximum width of 2 mm.
