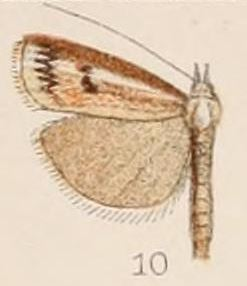

Scientific classification
- Kingdom: Animalia
- Phylum: Arthropoda
- Clade: Pancrustacea
- Class: Insecta
- Order: Lepidoptera
- Family: Crambidae
- Genus: Crambus
- Species: C. dianiphalis

Binomial name
- Crambus dianiphalis Hampson, 1908

= Crambus dianiphalis =

Species of moth

Crambus dianiphalis is a species of moth of the family Crambidae. It is found in Sri Lanka.

This species has a wingspan of 28mm.
