= Crambus nivellus =

Scientific classification
- Kingdom: Animalia
- Phylum: Arthropoda
- Clade: Pancrustacea
- Class: Insecta
- Order: Lepidoptera
- Family: Crambidae
- Genus: Crambus
- Species: C. nivellus

Binomial name
- Crambus nivellus (Kollar in Kollar & Redtenbacher, 1844)

Synonyms
- Chilo nivellus Kollar in Kollar & Redtenbacher, 1844; Crambus aurivittatus Moore, 1888; Crambus todarius Butler, 1883

Species of moth

Crambus nivellus is a moth of the family Crambidae. It is found in India, including Uttar Pradesh, Darjeeling and the Nilgiri Mountains.
