= Crambus autotoxellus =

Scientific classification
- Kingdom: Animalia
- Phylum: Arthropoda
- Clade: Pancrustacea
- Class: Insecta
- Order: Lepidoptera
- Family: Crambidae
- Genus: Crambus
- Species: C. autotoxellus

Binomial name
- Crambus autotoxellus Dyar, 1914

Species of moth

Crambus autotoxellus is a moth in the family Crambidae. It was described by Harrison Gray Dyar Jr. in 1914. It is found in Mexico.
