= Crambus pavidellus =

Scientific classification
- Kingdom: Animalia
- Phylum: Arthropoda
- Clade: Pancrustacea
- Class: Insecta
- Order: Lepidoptera
- Family: Crambidae
- Genus: Crambus
- Species: C. pavidellus

Binomial name
- Crambus pavidellus Schaus, 1913

Species of moth

Crambus pavidellus is a moth in the family Crambidae. It was described by Schaus in 1913. It is found in Costa Rica.
