= Crambus vulcanus =

Scientific classification
- Kingdom: Animalia
- Phylum: Arthropoda
- Clade: Pancrustacea
- Class: Insecta
- Order: Lepidoptera
- Family: Crambidae
- Genus: Crambus
- Species: C. vulcanus

Binomial name
- Crambus vulcanus Bassi, 2000

Species of moth

Crambus vulcanus is a moth in the family Crambidae. It was described by Graziano Bassi in 2000. It is found in the Democratic Republic of the Congo.
