= Crambus zelator =

Scientific classification
- Kingdom: Animalia
- Phylum: Arthropoda
- Clade: Pancrustacea
- Class: Insecta
- Order: Lepidoptera
- Family: Crambidae
- Genus: Crambus
- Species: C. zelator

Binomial name
- Crambus zelator Bassi, 1992

Species of moth

Crambus zelator is a moth in the family Crambidae. It was described by Graziano Bassi in 1992. It is found in Madagascar.
