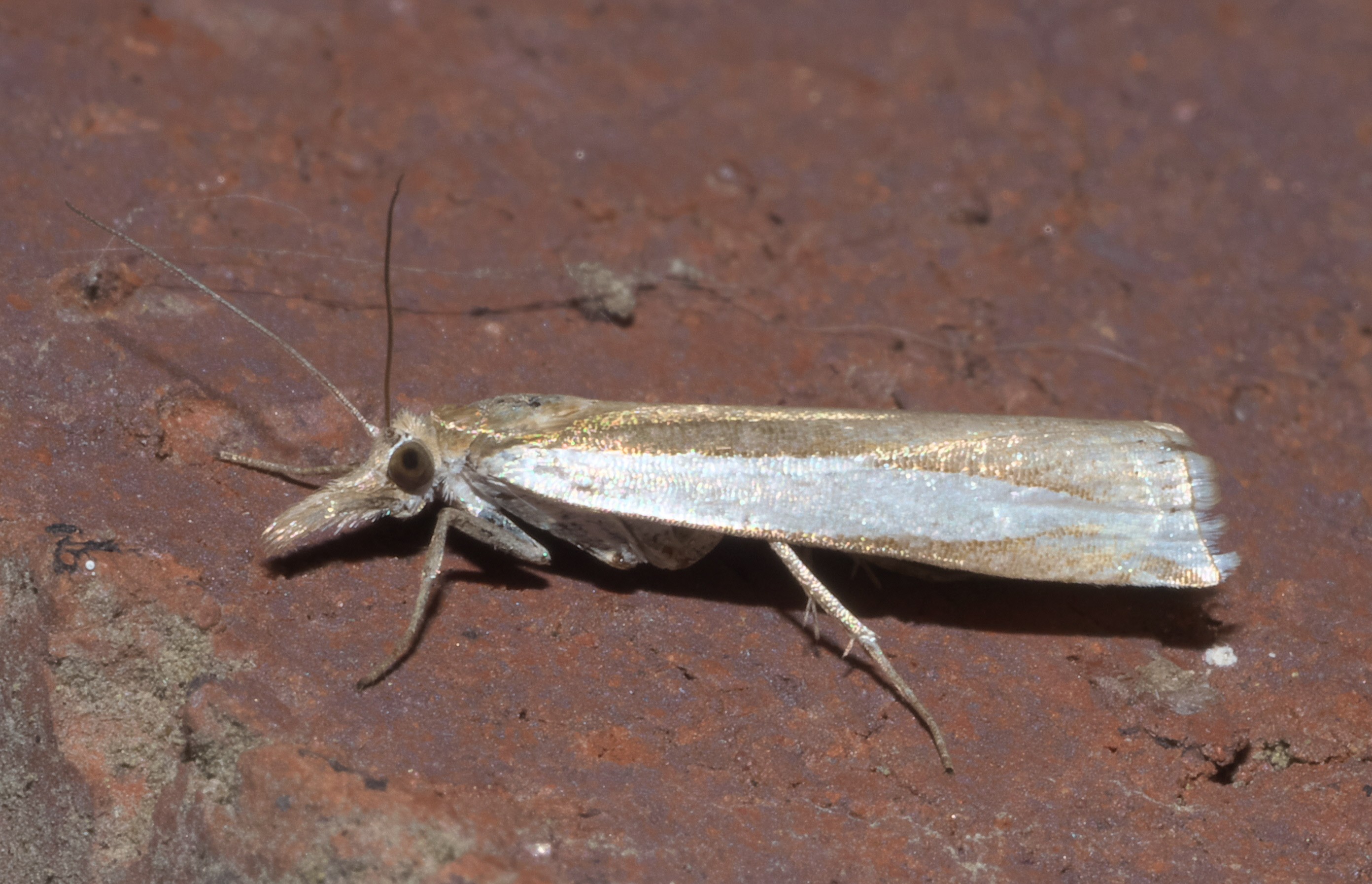

Scientific classification
- Kingdom: Animalia
- Phylum: Arthropoda
- Clade: Pancrustacea
- Class: Insecta
- Order: Lepidoptera
- Family: Crambidae
- Genus: Crambus
- Species: C. quinquareatus

Binomial name
- Crambus quinquareatus Zeller, 1877

Synonyms
- Crambus argentictus Hampson, 1919; Crambus extorralis Hulst, 1886; Crambus extornalis Grossbeck, 1917

= Crambus quinquareatus =

Large-striped grass-veneer

Species of moth

Crambus quinquareatus, the large-striped grass-veneer, is a moth in the family Crambidae. It was described by Philipp Christoph Zeller in 1877. It is found in North America, where it has been recorded from Alabama, Florida, Georgia, Louisiana, Maryland, Mississippi, North Carolina, Oklahoma, South Carolina and Texas.

The larvae feed on various grasses.
