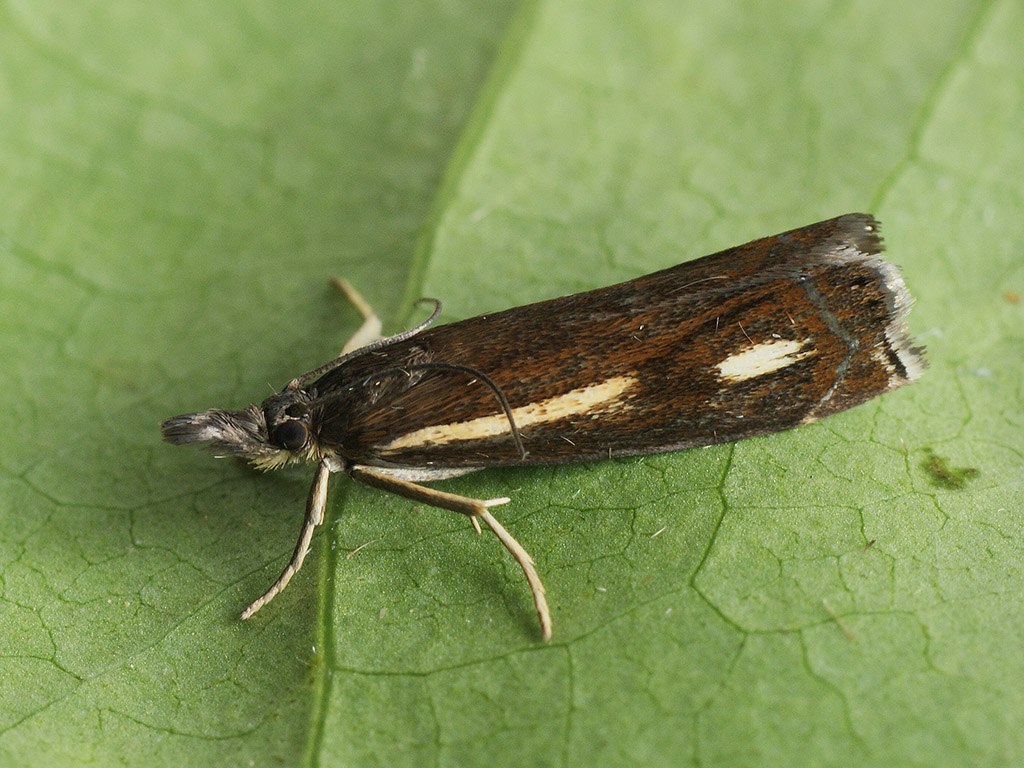

Scientific classification
- Kingdom: Animalia
- Phylum: Arthropoda
- Clade: Pancrustacea
- Class: Insecta
- Order: Lepidoptera
- Family: Crambidae
- Genus: Crambus
- Species: C. heringiellus

Binomial name
- Crambus heringiellus Herrich-Schaffer, 1848

Synonyms
- Crambus hemigiellus Hampson, 1896; Crambus heringiella

= Crambus heringiellus =

Species of moth

Crambus heringiellus is a species of moth in the family Crambidae described by Gottlieb August Wilhelm Herrich-Schäffer in 1848. It is found in Italy, Germany, Poland, Denmark, Fennoscandia, the Baltic region, Belarus and Russia.

The wingspan is 19–24 mm.

The larvae feed on Hypnum species.
