= Crambus nigriscriptellus =

Scientific classification
- Kingdom: Animalia
- Phylum: Arthropoda
- Clade: Pancrustacea
- Class: Insecta
- Order: Lepidoptera
- Family: Crambidae
- Genus: Crambus
- Species: C. nigriscriptellus

Binomial name
- Crambus nigriscriptellus South in Leech & South, 1901

Species of moth

Crambus nigriscriptellus is a moth in the family Crambidae. It was described by South in 1901. It is found in China (Sichuan).
