= Crambus perspicuus =

Scientific classification
- Kingdom: Animalia
- Phylum: Arthropoda
- Clade: Pancrustacea
- Class: Insecta
- Order: Lepidoptera
- Family: Crambidae
- Genus: Crambus
- Species: C. perspicuus

Binomial name
- Crambus perspicuus Walker, 1870

Species of moth

Crambus perspicuus is a moth in the family Crambidae. It was described by Francis Walker in 1870. It is found in Egypt and Saudi Arabia.
