= Crambus damotellus =

Scientific classification
- Kingdom: Animalia
- Phylum: Arthropoda
- Clade: Pancrustacea
- Class: Insecta
- Order: Lepidoptera
- Family: Crambidae
- Genus: Crambus
- Species: C. damotellus

Binomial name
- Crambus damotellus Schaus, 1922

Species of moth

Crambus damotellus is a moth in the family Crambidae. It was described by William Schaus in 1922. It is found in Mexico.
