= Crambus whalleyi =

Scientific classification
- Kingdom: Animalia
- Phylum: Arthropoda
- Clade: Pancrustacea
- Class: Insecta
- Order: Lepidoptera
- Family: Crambidae
- Genus: Crambus
- Species: C. whalleyi

Binomial name
- Crambus whalleyi Błeszyński, 1960

Species of moth

Crambus whalleyi is a moth in the family Crambidae. It was described by Stanisław Błeszyński in 1960. It is found in São Paulo, Brazil.
