= Crambus unistriatellus =

Wide-stripe grass-veneer

Scientific classification
- Kingdom: Animalia
- Phylum: Arthropoda
- Clade: Pancrustacea
- Class: Insecta
- Order: Lepidoptera
- Family: Crambidae
- Genus: Crambus
- Species: C. unistriatellus

Binomial name
- Crambus unistriatellus Packard, 1867

Synonyms
- Crambus exesus Grote, 1880

Species of moth

Crambus unistriatellus, the wide-stripe grass-veneer, is a moth in the family Crambidae. It was described by Alpheus Spring Packard in 1867. It is found in North America, where it has been recorded from British Columbia, Alberta, Labrador, Maine, Michigan, New Hampshire, New York, Pennsylvania, Minnesota and California. The habitat consists of grasslands.

The wingspan is 25–28 mm. The hindwings are white. Adults have been recorded on wing from June to October.

The larvae feed on grass roots.
