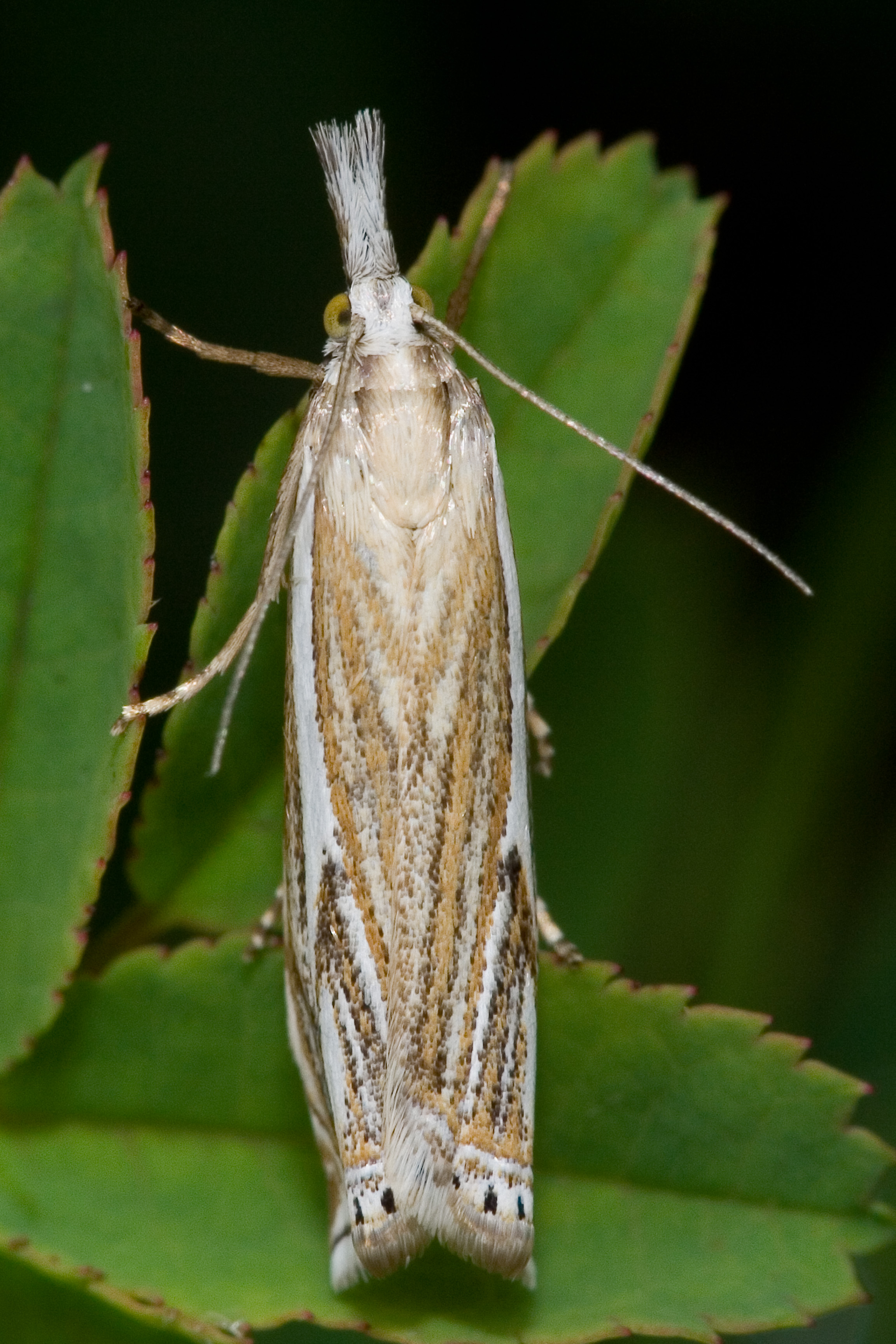
- Crambus lathoniellus

Scientific classification
- Kingdom: Animalia
- Phylum: Arthropoda
- Class: Insecta
- Order: Lepidoptera
- Family: Crambidae
- Tribe: Crambini
- Genus: Crambus; Fabricius, 1798

Type species
- Phalaena pascuella Linnaeus, 1758

Synonyms
- Argyroteuchia Hübner, 1825; Chilus Billberg, 1820; Palparia Haworth, 1811; Tetrachila Hübner, 1822

= Crambus =

Genus of moths

The genus Crambus includes around 155 species of moths in the family Crambidae, distributed globally. The adult stages are called crambid snout moths (a name shared with the rest of the family Crambidae, to distinguish them from Pyralidae snout moths), while the larvae of Crambus and the related genus Herpetogramma are the sod webworms, which can damage grasses.

== Life cycle ==
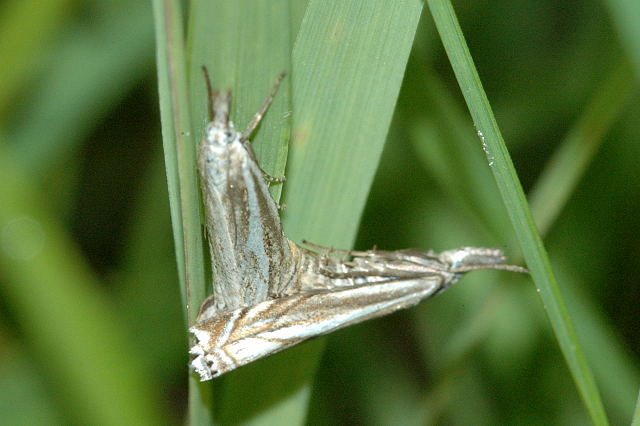
Crambus patella mating

Sod webworms have a bivoltine life cycle with four stages: egg, larva, pupa and imago (adult). They overwinter as larvae in their final or penultimate instar in the thatch or soil. With the coming of warmer weather, the larvae will pupate, and moths will appear in late spring or early summer. The first generation of eggs is laid in June, with larvae appearing in June and lasting until July. Adult moths appear from July until August. Under favorable conditions, a second generation will occur, with the adult stage laying eggs in early October.

=== Egg ===
The eggs of Crambus species are dry and nonadhesive, with an oval to elliptical shape. The eggs of most species are white to creamy white when first laid, but later turn bright orange or red. The size of the eggs varies between species, but ranges from 0.3 mm to 0.6 mm.

=== Larva ===
The color of the larvae also varies from greenish to beige, brown, or gray, with most larvae having dark, circular spots that extend over the entire body. From the first instar to the third instar, the head capsule will appear black, but later instars have a light brown head capsule with various black sculpturation. At the first instar, the head capsule is 0.19–0.23 mm wide, growing to 1.23–2.21 mm by the last instar. The length of whole larva is 9–13 mm (0.4–0.5 in) at the first instar and 24–28 mm (0.9–1.1 in) at the last instar.

Crambus larvae, known as "sod webworms", feed primarily on grasses. In turfgrass species, their primary host plants are cool-season grasses, with fewer records on warm-season grasses. Some species also feed on maize, wheat, rye, oats, timothy-grass, and other grasses in pastures, and meadows, with the most damage occurring in areas with permanent sod. The damage caused is more pronounced during times of drought.

=== Pupa ===
The pupa develops in a silken cocoon attached to soil particles, plant debris and fecal pellets. The cocoon resembles a small lump of earth, while the pupa itself is pale yellow at first, darkening to a mahogany brown. The pupae are 8–10 mm (0.3–0.4 in) long by 2.5 mm (0.1 in) wide.

=== Imago ===
The adult moth is whitish or light gray to tan. Many species have patterns of colors, including silver, gold, yellow, brown and black. The moths are approximately 12 mm (0.5 in) long, with wingspans of 20–25 mm (0.8–1.0 in). Like other snout moths, they have long labial palpi that extend in front of their heads, and fold their wings underneath their bodies, making them slender and harder to see while resting on plants.

== Damage ==
Sod webworms were first recognized as a serious pest of lawns and golf courses during the drought of 1928–1934 that affected most of the United States. Unlike many of the other more destructive turfgrass pests, the sod webworm is native to the United States and was not introduced.

Most damage occurs during the first instar, when the sod webworm only feeds on the foliage of the turfgrass. Damage is often seen as a small area of leaves that are yellow to brown. Sod webworms themselves will not be seen because of their nocturnal nature. During the day, the sod webworm can be found in its burrow in the center of the damaged area. Even though damage can be an eyesore, it does not hurt the turf because no damage is done to the crown of the plant. In closely mown turf and drought conditions, damage is more severe than in poorly maintained turf. In closely mown turf, symptoms will appear more quickly and prominently. During drought conditions, damage is more severe because the damage is often not seen until rainfall occurs.

=== Management ===
To be considered a serious infestation of sod webworms, 12 larvae must be found in a 0.1 square metres (1.1 sq ft) area. To test this, hollow pans are placed with a pyrethrum or detergent drench and allowed to sit for 10 minutes, then the larvae in the area are counted. During peak growing periods, the grass will often be able to recover by itself and not show serious damage. For high-end turf that cannot show any damage or serious infestations, predators of the sod webworms must be attracted, including birds and insect predators, such as ground beetles, robber flies, and predatory wasps. The larva is also prone to infection from microorganisms such as Beauveria bassiana and Nosema (Microsporidia). Parasitic nematodes such as Steinernema carpocapsae and Heterorhabditis heliothidis can also infect sod webworms.

== Systematics and taxonomy ==
The genus Crambus was erected by Johan Christian Fabricius in 1798, and was originally used to cover species which are now considered to belong to the Noctuidae. The type species was designated by John Curtis in 1826 as Phalaena pascuella (now Crambus pascuella). Fabricius originally included 62 species, a number which had increased by 1940 to 116, of which only 98 were thought to be valid. A 1986 estimate suggested there were "perhaps 400" species of Crambus.

Species in the genus Crambus now are:

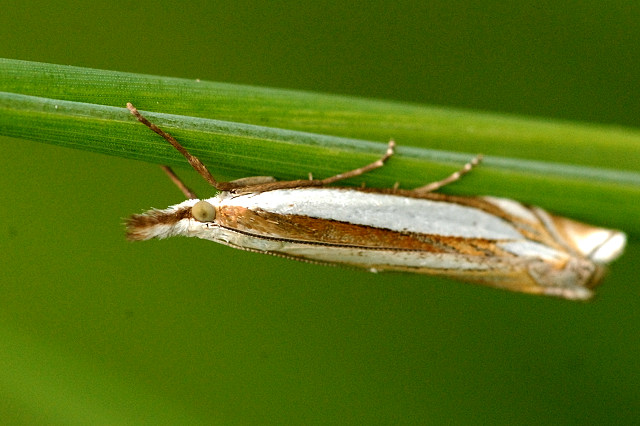
Crambus pascuella

- Crambus achilles Błeszyński, 1961
- Crambus acyperas Hampson, 1919
- Crambus agitatellus Clemens, 1860
- Crambus ainslieellus Klots, 1942
- Crambus albellus Clemens, 1860
- Crambus albifrons Schaus, 1913
- Crambus alexandrus Kirpichnikova, 1979
- Crambus alienellus (Germar E. F. & Fr. Kaulfuss, 1817)
- Crambus angulatus Barnes & McDunnough, 1918
- Crambus angustalatellus Maassen, 1890
- Crambus angustexon Błeszyński, 1962
- Crambus archimedes Błeszyński, 1961
- Crambus argyrophorus Butler, 1878
- Crambus aristophanes Błeszyński, 1961
- Crambus arnaudiae Rougeot, 1977
- Crambus athamas Błeszyński, 1961
- Crambus attis Bassi, 2012
- Crambus autotoxellus Dyar, 1914
- Crambus averroellus Bassi, 1990
- Crambus awemellus McDunnough, 1921
- Crambus bachi Bassi, 2012
- Crambus bellinii Bassi in Bassi & Trematerra, 2014
- Crambus bellissimus Błeszyński, 1961
- Crambus berliozi Bassi, 2012
- Crambus bidens Zeller, 1872
- Crambus bidentellus Hampson, 1919
- Crambus bigelovi Klots, 1967
- Crambus bipartellus South in Leech & South, 1901
- Crambus boislamberti Rougeot, 1977
- Crambus brachiiferus Hampson, 1919
- Crambus braunellus Klots, 1940
- Crambus brunneisquamatus Hampson, 1919
- Crambus caligula Błeszyński, 1961
- Crambus claviger Staudinger, 1899
- Crambus coccophthorus Błeszyński, 1962
- Crambus cockleellus Kearfott, 1908
- Crambus cormieri Błeszyński, 1961
- Crambus coryolanus Błeszyński, 1961
- Crambus cypridalis Hulst, 1886
- Crambus cyrilellus Klots, 1942
- Crambus cyrnellus Schawerda, 1926
- Crambus daeckellus Haimbach, 1907
- Crambus damotellus Schaus, 1922
- Crambus dedalus Bassi, 2000
- Crambus delineatellus Hampson, 1896
- Crambus descarpentriesi (Rougeot, 1977)
- Crambus dianiphalis Hampson, 1908
- Crambus diarhabdellus Hampson, 1919
- Crambus dimidiatellus Grote, 1883
- Crambus ellipticellus Hampson, 1919
- Crambus elongatus Hampson, 1919
- Crambus erechtheus Bassi, 1992
- Crambus ericella (Hübner, 1813)
- Crambus erostratus Bassi, 1992
- Crambus eurypides Błeszyński, 1961
- Crambus falcarius Zeller, 1872
- Crambus frescobaldii Bassi, 2012
- Crambus gausapalis Hulst, 1886
- Crambus geleches Błeszyński, 1967
- Crambus girardellus Clemens, 1860
- Crambus guerini Błeszyński, 1961
- Crambus hamella (Thunberg, 1794)
- Crambus hampsoni Błeszyński, 1961
- Crambus harrisi Klots, 1967
- Crambus hastifer Staudinger, 1899
- Crambus hemileucalis Hampson, 1896
- Crambus heringiellus Herrich-Schäffer, 1848
- Crambus humidellus Zeller, 1877
- Crambus icarus Błeszyński, 1961
- Crambus isshiki Matsumura, 1925
- Crambus johnsoni Klots, 1942
- Crambus jupiter Błeszyński, 1963
- Crambus kazitaellus Bassi, 1986
- Crambus kumatakellus Shibuya, 1928
- Crambus kuzakaiensis Okano, 1960
- Crambus lacteella Janse, 1922
- Crambus laqueatellus Clemens, 1860
- Crambus lascaellus Druce, 1896
- Crambus lathoniellus (Zincken, 1817)
- Crambus leachellus (Zincken, 1818)
- Crambus leuconotus Zeller, 1881
- Crambus leucoschalis Hampson, 1898
- Crambus lyonsellus Haimbach, 1915
- Crambus magnificus Błeszyński, 1956
- Crambus melanoneurus Hampson, 1919
- Crambus mesombrellus Hampson, 1919
- Crambus microstrigatus Hampson, 1919
- Crambus midas Błeszyński, 1961
- Crambus moeschleralis Schaus, 1940
- Crambus monostictus Hampson, 1919
- Crambus mozarti Bassi, 2012
- Crambus multilinellus Fernald, 1887
- Crambus multiradiellus Hampson, 1896
- Crambus narcissus Błeszyński, 1961
- Crambus nephretete Błeszyński, 1961
- Crambus netuncus Bassi, 2012
- Crambus neurellus Hampson, 1919
- Crambus nigriscriptellus South in Leech & South, 1901
- Crambus nigrivarialis Gaede, 1916
- Crambus niitakaensis Marumo, 1936
- Crambus nivellus (Kollar in Kollar & Redtenbacher, 1844)
- Crambus nolckeniellus Zeller, 1872
- Crambus occidentalis Grote, 1880
- Crambus okinawanus Inoue, 1982
- Crambus ovidius Błeszyński, 1961
- Crambus palustrellus Ragonot, 1876
- Crambus paris Bassi, 2012
- Crambus pascuella (Linnaeus, 1758)
- Crambus patulellus Walker, 1863
- Crambus pavidellus Schaus, 1913
- Crambus perlella (Scopoli, 1763)
- Crambus perspicuus Walker, 1870
- Crambus praefectellus (Zincken, 1821)
- Crambus pratella (Linnaeus, 1758)
- Crambus prometheus Błeszyński, 1961
- Crambus proteus Bassi & Mey in Mey, 2011
- Crambus pseudargyrophorus Okano, 1960
- Crambus psychellus Maassen, 1890
- Crambus puccinii Bassi, 2000
- Crambus pythagoras Błeszyński, 1961
- Crambus quinquareatus Zeller, 1877
- Crambus racabellus Druce, 1896
- Crambus reducta Janse, 1922
- Crambus richteri Błeszyński, 1963
- Crambus rickseckerellus Klots, 1940
- Crambus rossinii Bassi, 2012
- Crambus sachaensis Ustjuzhanin, 1988
- Crambus saltuellus Zeller, 1863
- Crambus sanfordellus Klots, 1942
- Crambus sapidus Błeszyński, 1967
- Crambus sargentellus Klots, 1942
- Crambus satrapellus (Zincken, 1821)
- Crambus sebrus Błeszyński, 1961
- Crambus sectitermina Hampson, 1910
- Crambus sibirica Alphéraky, 1897
- Crambus silvella (Hübner, 1813)
- Crambus sinicolellus Caradja, 1926
- Crambus sjoestedti Aurivillius, 1910
- Crambus sparselloides Bassi, 1986
- Crambus sparsellus Walker, 1866
- Crambus sperryellus Klots, 1940
- Crambus sudanicola Strand, 1915
- Crambus tenuis Bassi, 1992
- Crambus tenuistriga Hampson, 1898
- Crambus tessellatus Hampson, 1919
- Crambus themistocles Błeszyński, 1961
- Crambus thersites Błeszyński, 1961
- Crambus theseus Bassi, 2000
- Crambus tomanaellus Marumo, 1936
- Crambus trichusalis Hulst, 1886
- Crambus tutillus McDunnough, 1921
- Crambus uliginosellus Zeller, 1850
- Crambus uniformella Janse, 1922
- Crambus unistriatellus Packard, 1867
- Crambus vagistrigellus de Joannis, 1913
- Crambus varii Bassi, 2012
- Crambus viettellus Błeszyński & Collins, 1962
- Crambus virgatellus Wileman, 1911
- Crambus vittiterminellus Hampson, 1919
- Crambus vulcanus Bassi, 2000
- Crambus watsonellus Klots, 1942
- Crambus whalleyi Błeszyński, 1960
- Crambus whitmerellus Klots, 1942
- Crambus xonorus Błeszyński, 1963
- Crambus youngellus Kearfott, 1908
- Crambus zelator Bassi, 1992

== Former species ==
- Crambus argyrostola Hampson, 1919
- Crambus xebus Błeszyński, 1962
