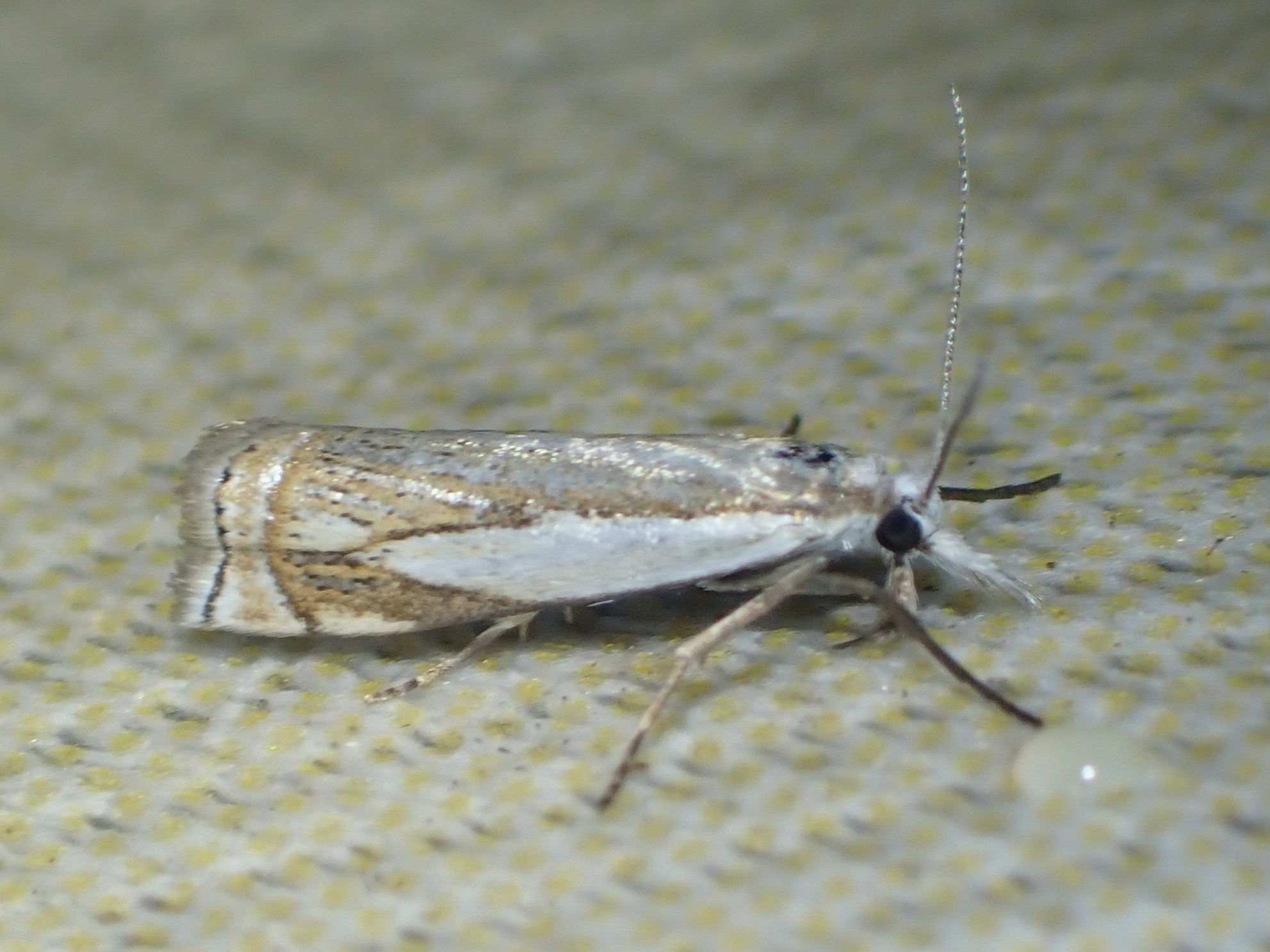

Scientific classification
- Kingdom: Animalia
- Phylum: Arthropoda
- Clade: Pancrustacea
- Class: Insecta
- Order: Lepidoptera
- Family: Crambidae
- Genus: Crambus
- Species: C. lyonsellus

Binomial name
- Crambus lyonsellus Haimbach, 1915

= Crambus lyonsellus =

Species of moth

Crambus lyonsellus is a species of moth in the family Crambidae. It was first described by Frank Haimbach in 1915. It is found in North America, where it has been recorded from Maine, Maryland, Michigan, Minnesota, Ontario, Quebec and West Virginia.
