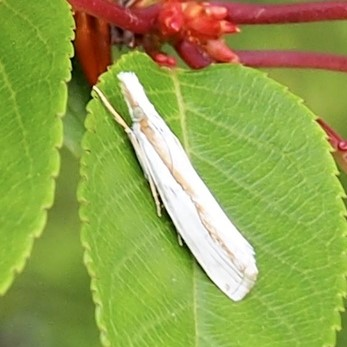

Scientific classification
- Kingdom: Animalia
- Phylum: Arthropoda
- Clade: Pancrustacea
- Class: Insecta
- Order: Lepidoptera
- Family: Crambidae
- Genus: Crambus
- Species: C. virgatellus

Binomial name
- Crambus virgatellus Wileman, 1911

Synonyms
- Crambus argyrophorus var. coreanus Shibuya, 1927

= Crambus virgatellus =

Species of moth

Crambus virgatellus is a species of moth in the family Crambidae. It was described by Alfred Ernest Wileman in 1911. It is found in Japan, Korea and China (Zhejiang).
