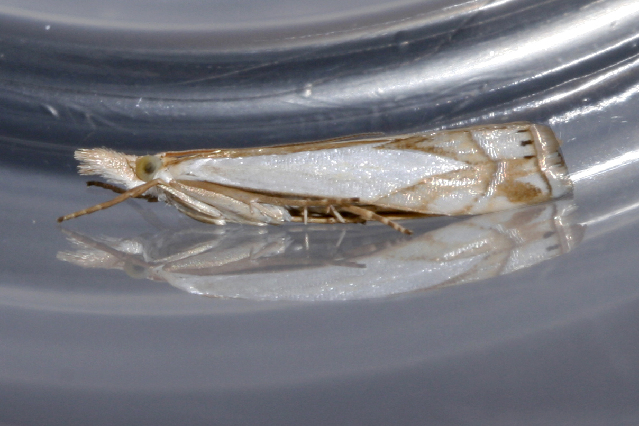

Scientific classification
- Kingdom: Animalia
- Phylum: Arthropoda
- Clade: Pancrustacea
- Class: Insecta
- Order: Lepidoptera
- Family: Crambidae
- Genus: Crambus
- Species: C. bidens

Binomial name
- Crambus bidens Zeller, 1872

= Crambus bidens =

Species of moth

Crambus bidens, the forked grass-veneer, is a moth in the family Crambidae. It was described by Philipp Christoph Zeller in 1872. It is found in North America, where it has been recorded from Massachusetts, New York, Ontario, New Jersey, Quebec, Michigan and Alberta. The habitat consists of bogs.
