= Neodactria daemonis =

Scientific classification
- Kingdom: Animalia
- Phylum: Arthropoda
- Clade: Pancrustacea
- Class: Insecta
- Order: Lepidoptera
- Family: Crambidae
- Subfamily: Crambinae
- Tribe: Crambini
- Genus: Neodactria
- Species: N. daemonis

Binomial name
- Neodactria daemonis Landry & Klots in Landry & Brown, 2005

Species of moth

Neodactria daemonis is a moth in the family Crambidae. It was described by Bernard Landry and Alexander Barrett Klots in 2005. It is found in North America, where it has been recorded from Devil's Den State Park in Arkansas and Missouri.

The wingspan is 21–25.5 mm for males and 18–22 mm for females. The forewings are beige with brown markings of various shades. The hindwings are brown to grayish brown with bicolored scales.

== Etymology ==
The name refers to the type locality.
