= Crambus youngellus =

Scientific classification
- Kingdom: Animalia
- Phylum: Arthropoda
- Clade: Pancrustacea
- Class: Insecta
- Order: Lepidoptera
- Family: Crambidae
- Genus: Crambus
- Species: C. youngellus

Binomial name
- Crambus youngellus Kearfott, 1908

Species of moth

Crambus youngellus, or Young's grass-veneer, is a moth in the family Crambidae. It was described by William D. Kearfott in 1908. It is found in North America, where it has been recorded from north-eastern United States and southern Ontario.
