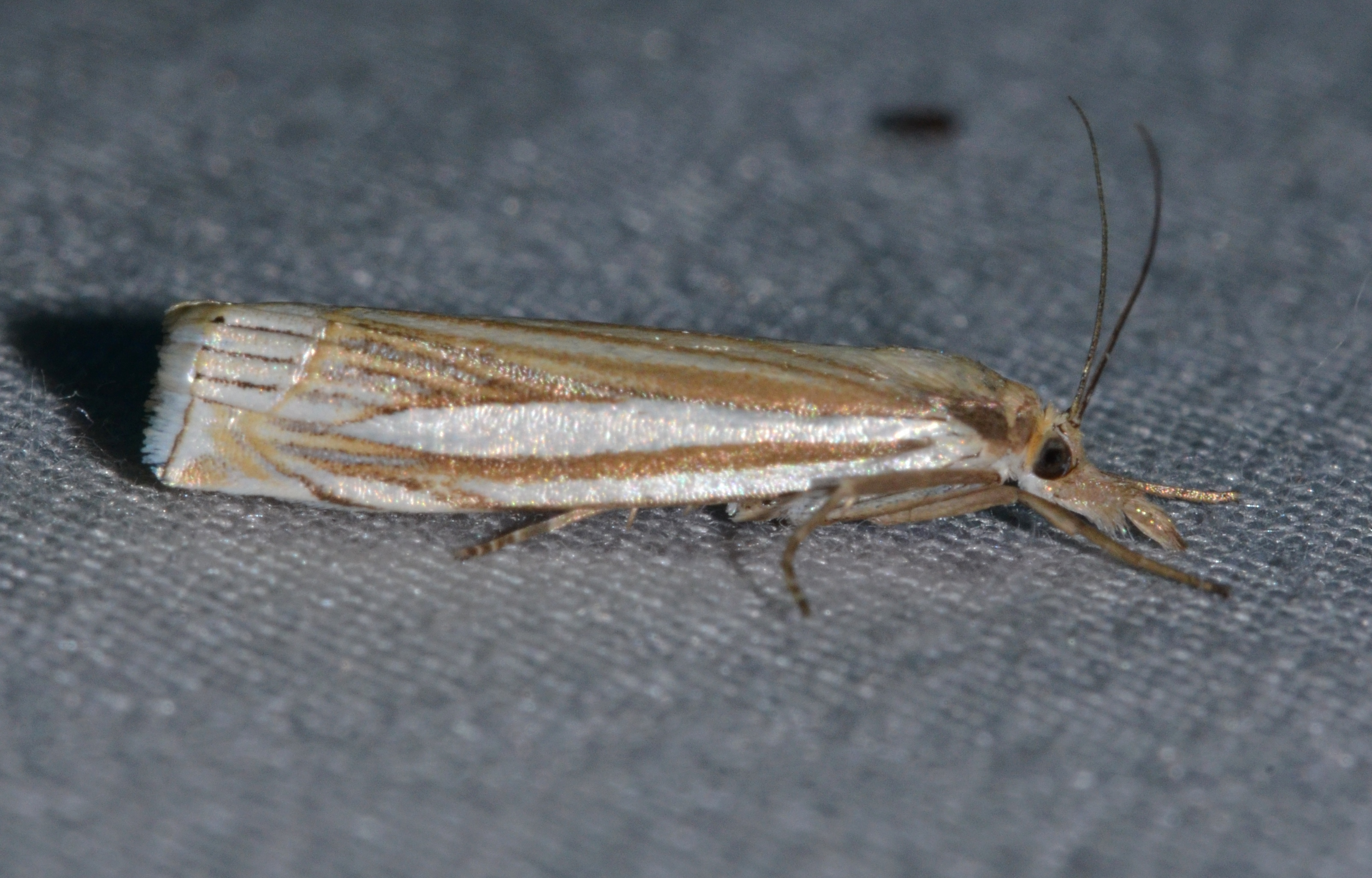

Scientific classification
- Kingdom: Animalia
- Phylum: Arthropoda
- Clade: Pancrustacea
- Class: Insecta
- Order: Lepidoptera
- Family: Crambidae
- Genus: Crambus
- Species: C. laqueatellus

Binomial name
- Crambus laqueatellus Clemens, 1860

Synonyms
- Crambus semifusellus Walker, 1863

= Crambus laqueatellus =

Species of moth

Crambus laqueatellus, the eastern grass-veneer, is a moth in the family Crambidae. It was described by James Brackenridge Clemens in 1860. It is found in North America, where it has been recorded from Ontario and Maine to South Carolina, west to Texas and north to North Dakota.

The wingspan is 23–30 mm. Adults are on wing from April to September.

The larvae feed on grasses.
