= Crambus moeschleralis =

Scientific classification
- Kingdom: Animalia
- Phylum: Arthropoda
- Clade: Pancrustacea
- Class: Insecta
- Order: Lepidoptera
- Family: Crambidae
- Genus: Crambus
- Species: C. moeschleralis

Binomial name
- Crambus moeschleralis Schaus, 1940

Species of moth

Crambus moeschleralis is a moth in the family Crambidae. It was described by William Schaus in 1940. It is found in Puerto Rico.
