= Crambus palustrellus =

Scientific classification
- Kingdom: Animalia
- Phylum: Arthropoda
- Clade: Pancrustacea
- Class: Insecta
- Order: Lepidoptera
- Family: Crambidae
- Genus: Crambus
- Species: C. palustrellus

Binomial name
- Crambus palustrellus Ragonot, 1876

Species of moth

Crambus palustrellus is a species of moth in the family Crambidae. It is found in France.

The wingspan is 17–18 mm.
