= Crambus hemileucalis =

Scientific classification
- Kingdom: Animalia
- Phylum: Arthropoda
- Clade: Pancrustacea
- Class: Insecta
- Order: Lepidoptera
- Family: Crambidae
- Genus: Crambus
- Species: C. hemileucalis

Binomial name
- Crambus hemileucalis Hampson, 1896

Species of moth

Crambus hemileucalis is a moth in the family Crambidae. It was described by George Hampson in 1896. It is found in India.
