= Crambus daeckellus =

Scientific classification
- Kingdom: Animalia
- Phylum: Arthropoda
- Clade: Pancrustacea
- Class: Insecta
- Order: Lepidoptera
- Family: Crambidae
- Genus: Crambus
- Species: C. daeckellus

Binomial name
- Crambus daeckellus Haimbach, 1907

Species of moth

Crambus daeckellus, or Daecke's pyralid moth, is a moth in the family Crambidae. It was described by Frank Haimbach in 1907. It is found in North America, where it has been recorded from New Jersey. The habitat consists of pinelands and the species is thought to be endemic to the Pine Barrens.
