= Crambus vagistrigellus =

Scientific classification
- Kingdom: Animalia
- Phylum: Arthropoda
- Clade: Pancrustacea
- Class: Insecta
- Order: Lepidoptera
- Family: Crambidae
- Genus: Crambus
- Species: C. vagistrigellus

Binomial name
- Crambus vagistrigellus de Joannis, 1913

Species of moth

Crambus vagistrigellus is a moth in the family Crambidae. It was described by Joseph de Joannis in 1913. It is found in Eritrea.
