= Crambus humidellus =

Scientific classification
- Kingdom: Animalia
- Phylum: Arthropoda
- Clade: Pancrustacea
- Class: Insecta
- Order: Lepidoptera
- Family: Crambidae
- Genus: Crambus
- Species: C. humidellus

Binomial name
- Crambus humidellus Zeller, 1877

Synonyms
- Crambus splendidellus Christoph, 1881; Crambus yokohamae Butler, 1879

Species of moth

Crambus humidellus is a moth in the family Crambidae. It was described by Zeller in 1877. It is found in China (Manchuria), Russia (Ussuri, Amur, Sakhalin), Korea and Japan.

The wingspan is about 11 mm.
