= Crambus multiradiellus =

Scientific classification
- Kingdom: Animalia
- Phylum: Arthropoda
- Clade: Pancrustacea
- Class: Insecta
- Order: Lepidoptera
- Family: Crambidae
- Genus: Crambus
- Species: C. multiradiellus

Binomial name
- Crambus multiradiellus Hampson, 1898

Species of moth

Crambus multiradiellus is a moth in the family Crambidae. It was described by George Hampson in 1898. It is found in the Brazilian states of Paraná and São Paulo.
