= Crambus lacteella =

Scientific classification
- Kingdom: Animalia
- Phylum: Arthropoda
- Clade: Pancrustacea
- Class: Insecta
- Order: Lepidoptera
- Family: Crambidae
- Genus: Crambus
- Species: C. lacteella

Binomial name
- Crambus lacteella Janse, 1922

Species of moth

Crambus lacteella is a moth in the family Crambidae. It was described by Anthonie Johannes Theodorus Janse in 1922. It is found in South Africa.
