= Crambus tomanaellus =

Scientific classification
- Kingdom: Animalia
- Phylum: Arthropoda
- Clade: Pancrustacea
- Class: Insecta
- Order: Lepidoptera
- Family: Crambidae
- Genus: Crambus
- Species: C. tomanaellus

Binomial name
- Crambus tomanaellus Marumo, 1936

Species of moth

Crambus tomanaellus is a moth in the family Crambidae. It was described by Nobukatsu Marumo in 1936. It is found in Taiwan.
