= Crambus isshiki =

Scientific classification
- Kingdom: Animalia
- Phylum: Arthropoda
- Clade: Pancrustacea
- Class: Insecta
- Order: Lepidoptera
- Family: Crambidae
- Genus: Crambus
- Species: C. isshiki

Binomial name
- Crambus isshiki Matsumura, 1925

Synonyms
- Crambus isshikii Hua, 2005

Species of moth

Crambus isshiki is a moth in the family Crambidae. It was described by Shōnen Matsumura in 1925. It is found in Russia, where it has been recorded from southern Sakhalin, Ussuri and Amur. It has also been recorded from China (Manchuria).
