= Crambus leuconotus =

Scientific classification
- Kingdom: Animalia
- Phylum: Arthropoda
- Clade: Pancrustacea
- Class: Insecta
- Order: Lepidoptera
- Family: Crambidae
- Genus: Crambus
- Species: C. leuconotus

Binomial name
- Crambus leuconotus Zeller, 1881

Species of moth

Crambus leuconotus is a moth in the family Crambidae. It was described by Philipp Christoph Zeller in 1881. It is found in Colombia.
