= Crambus archimedes =

Scientific classification
- Kingdom: Animalia
- Phylum: Arthropoda
- Clade: Pancrustacea
- Class: Insecta
- Order: Lepidoptera
- Family: Crambidae
- Genus: Crambus
- Species: C. archimedes

Binomial name
- Crambus archimedes Błeszyński, 1961

Species of moth

Crambus archimedes is a moth in the family Crambidae. It was described by Stanisław Błeszyński in 1961. It is found in Lesotho.
