= Alexander Barrett Klots =

Alexander Barrett Klots (December 12, 1903 – April 18, 1989) was an American entomologist who specialised in Lepidoptera.

== Biography ==
Klots was born in New York City in 1903.

His collection is conserved in the American Museum of Natural History, a smaller part is held by the University of Connecticut.

Two moth species, Neodactria glenni and Neodactria daemonis, were described in the early 21st century using the authority of Bernard Landry and Klots. The specimens had been collected and described by Klots but not published and were published by Landry in 2002 and 2005 respectively.

Klots died in Putnam, Connecticut in 1989.

== Works ==
- 1933 Directions for Collecting and Preserving Insects. Wards Natural Science Establishment, Rochester, New York. 30 pp. [with two later editions].
- 1959 with Elsie B. Klots. Living Insects of the World. Garden City, N.Y Doubleday full text
- 1977 with Elsie Broughton Klots 1001 Questions Answered About Insects. New York, Dodd, Mead ISBN 978-0-486-23470-0
- 1978 Field Guide to the Butterflies of North America East of the Great Plains. Houghton Mifflin ISBN 9780395258590
