= List of moths of Eritrea =

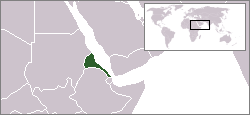
Location of Eritrea

There are about 340 known moth species of Eritrea. The moths (mostly nocturnal) and butterflies (mostly diurnal) together make up the taxonomic order Lepidoptera.

This is a list of moth species which have been recorded in Eritrea.

== Arctiidae ==
- Aloa moloneyi (Druce, 1887)
- Alpenus maculosa (Stoll, 1781)
- Alpenus nigropunctata (Bethune-Baker, 1908)
- Alpenus schraderi (Rothschild, 1910)
- Amata magnopupillata Berio, 1941
- Amata magrettii Berio, 1937
- Amerila roseomarginata (Rothschild, 1910)
- Amerila vitrea Plötz, 1880
- Apisa canescens Walker, 1855
- Apisa subcanescens Rothschild, 1910
- Automolis pallida (Hampson, 1901)
- Caripodia fusca Berio, 1939
- Cyana puella (Drury, 1773)
- Lepista arabica (Rebel, 1907)
- Macrosia fumeola (Walker, 1854)
- Metarctia haematricha Hampson, 1905
- Metarctia lateritia Herrich-Schäffer, 1855
- Metarctia pumila Hampson, 1909
- Metarctia unicolor (Oberthür, 1880)
- Micralarctia punctulatum (Wallengren, 1860)
- Nyctemera apicalis (Walker, 1854)
- Paralpenus ugandae (Hampson, 1916)
- Paralpenus wintgensi (Strand, 1909)
- Secusio somalensis Hampson, ????
- Seydelia geometrica (Oberthür, 1883)
- Spilosoma metaleuca (Hampson, 1905)
- Teracotona proditrix (Berio, 1939)
- Teracotona pruinosa de Joannis, 1912
- Teracotona rhodophaea (Walker, 1865)
- Teracotona subterminata Hampson, 1901
- Thyretes negus Oberthür, 1878
- Utetheisa amhara Jordan, 1939
- Utetheisa pulchella (Linnaeus, 1758)

== Bombycidae ==
- Ocinara ficicola (Westwood & Ormerod, 1889)

== Brahmaeidae ==
- Dactyloceras richinii Berio, 1940

== Carposinidae ==
- Carposina chersodes Meyrick, 1915

== Cossidae ==
- Azygophleps inclusa (Walker, 1856)

== Crambidae ==
- Cotachena smaragdina (Butler, 1875)

== Eupterotidae ==
- Hoplojana abyssinica Rothschild, 1917
- Hoplojana distincta Rothschild, 1917
- Janomima dannfelti (Aurivillius, 1893)
- Janomima mariana (White, 1843)
- Phiala alba Aurivillius, 1893
- Phiala longilinea Berio, 1939

== Geometridae ==
- Chiasmia turbulentata (Guenée, 1858)
- Nychiodes tyttha Prout, 1915
- Scopula beccarii (Prout, 1915)
- Scopula lactaria (Walker, 1861)
- Xylopteryx emunctaria (Guenée, 1858)
- Zamarada euryscaphes Prout, 1915
- Zamarada torrida D. S. Fletcher, 1974

== Gracillariidae ==
- Metriochroa inferior (Silvestri, 1914)
- Phyllocnistis citrella Stainton, 1856

== Lasiocampidae ==
- Beralade perobliqua Walker, 1855
- Beriola anagnostarai (Berio, 1939)
- Bombycopsis indecora (Walker, 1865)
- Eucraera magna (Aurivillius, 1908)
- Eucraera minor (Gaede, 1915)
- Odontopacha kilwana Strand, 1911
- Philotherma clara Bethune-Baker, 1908
- Philotherma rosa (Druce, 1887)
- Schausinna affinis Aurivillius, 1910
- Sena mendax (Berio, 1939)
- Streblote acaciae (Klug, 1829)
- Streblote badaglioi (Berio, 1937)
- Streblote nyassanum (Strand, 1912)
- Streblote polydora (Druce, 1887)

== Limacodidae ==
- Coenobasis postflavida Hampson, 1910
- Crothaema flava Berio, 1940
- Latoia chlorea Berio, 1939
- Parasa lanceolata Hering, 1928

== Lymantriidae ==
- Bracharoa impurata de Joannis, 1913
- Bracharoa reducta Hering, 1926
- Casama hemippa Swinhoe, 1906
- Crorema collenettei Hering, 1932
- Dasychira daphne Hering, 1926
- Dasychira plesia Collenette, 1939
- Knappetra fasciata (Walker, 1855)
- Laelia extorta (Distant, 1897)
- Laelia promissa Berio, 1940
- Naroma signifera Walker, 1856
- Polymona rufifemur Walker, 1855
- Stracilla translucida (Oberthür, 1880)

== Noctuidae ==
- Abrostola brevipennis (Walker, 1858)
- Acantholipes circumdata (Walker, 1858)
- Achaea catella Guenée, 1852
- Achaea finita (Guenée, 1852)
- Achaea infinita (Guenée, 1852)
- Achaea lienardi (Boisduval, 1833)
- Achaea mercatoria (Fabricius, 1775)
- Acontia antica Walker, 1862
- Acontia carnescens (Hampson, 1910)
- Acontia hoppei Hacker, Legrain & Fibiger, 2008
- Acontia hortensis Swinhoe, 1884
- Acontia insocia (Walker, 1857)
- Acontia opalinoides Guenée, 1852
- Acontia psaliphora (Hampson, 1910)
- Acontia semialba Hampson, 1910
- Acontia transfigurata Wallengren, 1856
- Acontia viridivariegata Berio, 1939
- Acontia wahlbergi Wallengren, 1856
- Aegocera brevivitta Hampson, 1901
- Aegocera rectilinea Boisduval, 1836
- Agrotis biconica Kollar, 1844
- Agrotis incommodoides Berio, 1950
- Agrotis lividoradiata Berio, 1940
- Agrotis longiclava (de Joannis, 1913)
- Agrotis metathoracica Berio, 1939
- Agrotis pictifascia (Hampson, 1896)
- Agrotis putativa Berio, 1941
- Agrotis segetum ([Denis & Schiffermüller], 1775)
- Amazonides axyliaesimilis (Berio, 1939)
- Amazonides fumicolor (Hampson, 1902)
- Amyna axis Guenée, 1852
- Amyna punctum (Fabricius, 1794)
- Androlymnia clavata Hampson, 1910
- Anomis flava (Fabricius, 1775)
- Anomis sabulifera (Guenée, 1852)
- Anomis tamsi Berio, 1940
- Antarchaea fragilis (Butler, 1875)
- Anticarsia rubricans (Boisduval, 1833)
- Antitype africana Berio, 1939
- Argyrogramma signata (Fabricius, 1775)
- Ariathisa abyssinia (Guenée, 1852)
- Ariathisa semiluna (Hampson, 1909)
- Asota speciosa (Drury, 1773)
- Athetis aeschrioides Berio, 1940
- Athetis biumbrosa Berio, 1940
- Athetis satellitia (Hampson, 1902)
- Athetis tetraglypha Berio, 1939
- Aucha melaleuca Berio, 1940
- Audea melaleuca Walker, 1865
- Audea postalbida Berio, 1954
- Autoba olivacea (Walker, 1858)
- Brevipecten calimanii (Berio, 1939)
- Busseola fusca (Fuller, 1901)
- Calliodes appollina Guenée, 1852
- Callixena barbara (Berio, 1940)
- Callopistria yerburii Butler, 1884
- Caradrina atriluna Guenée, 1852
- Caradrina edentata (Berio, 1941)
- Catephia mesonephele Hampson, 1916
- Cerocala illustrata Holland, 1897
- Cetola vicina de Joannis, 1913
- Chasmina tibialis (Fabricius, 1775)
- Chrysodeixis chalcites (Esper, 1789)
- Condica capensis (Guenée, 1852)
- Crameria amabilis (Drury, 1773)
- Craniophora hemileuca Berio, 1941
- Cyligramma latona (Cramer, 1775)
- Digama africana Swinhoe, 1907
- Digama aganais (Felder, 1874)
- Digama meridionalis Swinhoe, 1907
- Diparopsis castanea Hampson, 1902
- Drasteria yerburyi (Butler, 1892)
- Dysgonia algira (Linnaeus, 1767)
- Dysgonia torrida (Guenée, 1852)
- Engusanacantha bilineata Berio, 1941
- Entomogramma pardus Guenée, 1852
- Ericeia inangulata (Guenée, 1852)
- Ethiopica phaeocausta Hampson, 1916
- Eublemma ecthaemata Hampson, 1896
- Eublemma leucozona Hampson, 1910
- Eublemma mesozona Hampson, 1914
- Eublemma olmii Berio, 1937
- Eublemma parvisi Berio, 1940
- Eublemma quadrilineata Moore, 1881
- Eublemma quinarioides Berio, 1947
- Eublemma staudingeri (Wallengren, 1875)
- Eudocima fullonia (Clerck, 1764)
- Eudocima materna (Linnaeus, 1767)
- Euneophlebia pruinosa Berio, 1940
- Euplexia augens Felder & Rogenhofer, 1874
- Eustrotia accentuata Berio, 1950
- Eustrotia trigonodes Hampson, 1910
- Eutelia discitriga Walker, 1865
- Eutelia mima Prout, 1925
- Euxoa cymograpta Hampson, 1918
- Feliniopsis consummata (Walker, 1857)
- Feliniopsis minnecii (Berio, 1939)
- Grammodes euclidioides Guenée, 1852
- Grammodes stolida (Fabricius, 1775)
- Helicoverpa zea (Boddie, 1850)
- Heliothis richinii (Berio, 1939)
- Heraclia superba (Butler, 1875)
- Heteropalpia cortytoides Berio, 1939
- Heteropalpia exarata (Mabille, 1890)
- Heteropalpia vetusta (Walker, 1865)
- Hypena obacerralis Walker, 1859
- Hypocala subsatura Guenée, 1852
- Hypotacha raffaldii Berio, 1939
- Leucania albimacula (Gaede, 1916)
- Leucania bisetulata (Berio, 1940)
- Leucania longivittata Berio, 1940
- Leucania loreyi (Duponchel, 1827)
- Leucania mediolacteata (Berio, 1941)
- Leucania melanostrota (Hampson, 1905)
- Lithacodia blandula (Guenée, 1862)
- Lophotavia incivilis Walker, 1865
- Lygephila mommereti (Berio, 1940)
- Marathyssa cuneata (Saalmüller, 1891)
- Masalia disticta (Hampson, 1902)
- Masalia flavistrigata (Hampson, 1903)
- Masalia leucosticta (Hampson, 1902)
- Masalia transvaalica (Distant, 1902)
- Mentaxya albifrons (Geyer, 1837)
- Mentaxya ignicollis (Walker, 1857)
- Mentaxya muscosa Geyer, 1837
- Mentaxya rimosa (Guenée, 1852)
- Micraxylia delicatula (Berio, 1939)
- Mitrophrys menete (Cramer, 1775)
- Mocis mayeri (Boisduval, 1833)
- Mythimna combinata (Walker, 1857)
- Mythimna natalensis (Butler, 1875)
- Odontestra avitta Fawcett, 1917
- Odontestra richinii Berio, 1940
- Odontestra variegata Berio, 1940
- Oedicodia limbata Butler, 1898
- Oligia ambigua (Walker, 1858)
- Omphalestra nellyae (Berio, 1939)
- Ophisma albitermia (Hampson, 1910)
- Ophiusa dianaris (Guenée, 1852)
- Ophiusa rectificata (Berio, 1841)
- Ophiusa tettensis (Hopffer, 1857)
- Ophiusa tirhaca (Cramer, 1777)
- Oraesia emarginata (Fabricius, 1794)
- Ozarba adducta Berio, 1940
- Ozarba atrifera Hampson, 1910
- Ozarba captata Berio, 1940
- Ozarba cryptica Berio, 1940
- Ozarba domina (Holland, 1894)
- Ozarba exoplaga Berio, 1940
- Ozarba heliastis (Hampson, 1902)
- Ozarba lepida Saalmüller, 1891
- Ozarba megaplaga Hampson, 1910
- Ozarba mortua Berio, 1940
- Ozarba nigroviridis (Hampson, 1902)
- Ozarba phaea (Hampson, 1902)
- Ozarba rubrivena Hampson, 1910
- Ozarba semipurpurea (Hampson, 1902)
- Ozarba separabilis Berio, 1940
- Ozarba sinua Hampson, 1910
- Ozarba terribilis Berio, 1940
- Ozarba timida Berio, 1940
- Ozarba variabilis Berio, 1940
- Pandesma anysa Guenée, 1852
- Pericyma mendax (Walker, 1858)
- Phyllophila richinii Berio, 1940
- Phytometra pentheus Fawcett, 1916
- Plecopterodes gandolfii Berio, 1939
- Polydesma scriptilis Guenée, 1852
- Polydesma umbricola Boisduval, 1833
- Protarache polygrapha Berio, 1950
- Pseudozarba mesozona (Hampson, 1896)
- Pseudozarba opella (Swinhoe, 1885)
- Radara subcupralis (Walker, [1866])
- Rougeotia calumniosa (Berio, 1939)
- Serrodes partita (Fabricius, 1775)
- Sesamia calamistis Hampson, 1910
- Sphingomorpha chlorea (Cramer, 1777)
- Spodoptera cilium Guenée, 1852
- Spodoptera exempta (Walker, 1857)
- Spodoptera exigua (Hübner, 1808)
- Spodoptera littoralis (Boisduval, 1833)
- Spodoptera mauritia (Boisduval, 1833)
- Stilbotis dubium (Berio, 1939)
- Syngrapha circumflexa (Linnaeus, 1767)
- Timora turtur Berio, 1939
- Tracheplexia richinii Berio, 1973
- Tracheplexia viridisparsa (Berio, 1939)
- Trichoplusia ni (Hübner, [1803])
- Trichoplusia orichalcea (Fabricius, 1775)
- Tricraterifrontia xanthiata Berio, 1940
- Trigonodes exportata Guenée, 1852
- Trigonodes hyppasia (Cramer, 1779)
- Tytroca leucoptera (Hampson, 1896)
- Vittaplusia vittata (Wallengren, 1856)

== Nolidae ==
- Arcyophora longivalvis Guenée, 1852
- Arcyophora patricula (Hampson, 1902)
- Blenina squamifera (Wallengren, 1860)
- Characoma adiabunensis Berio, 1940
- Earias biplaga Walker, 1866
- Earias cupreoviridis (Walker, 1862)
- Earias insulana (Boisduval, 1833)
- Earias richinii Berio, 1940
- Leocyma candace Fawcett, 1916
- Maurilia arcuata (Walker, [1858])
- Xanthodes albago (Fabricius, 1794)

== Notodontidae ==
- Anaphe reticulata Walker, 1855
- Antheua aurifodinae (Distant, 1902)
- Antheua simplex Walker, 1855
- Antheua ungulata (Berio, 1939)
- Antheua woerdeni (Snellen, 1872)
- Phalera imitata Druce, 1896
- Thaumetopoea apologetica Strand, 1909

== Saturniidae ==
- Aurivillius arata (Westwood, 1849)
- Bunaea alcinoe (Stoll, 1780)
- Bunaeopsis oubie (Guérin-Méneville, 1849)
- Bunaeopsis phidias (Weymer, 1909)
- Campimoptilum kuntzei (Dewitz, 1881)
- Cirina forda (Westwood, 1849)
- Epiphora antinorii (Oberthür, 1880)
- Epiphora bauhiniae (Guérin-Méneville, 1832)
- Gonimbrasia belina (Westwood, 1849)
- Gonimbrasia ukerewensis (Rebel, 1922)
- Gynanisa maja (Klug, 1836)
- Holocerina smilax (Westwood, 1849)
- Lobobunaea phaedusa (Drury, 1782)
- Pseudobunaea epithyrena (Maassen & Weymer, 1885)
- Usta terpsichore (Maassen & Weymer, 1885)
- Yatanga smithi (Holland, 1892)

== Sphingidae ==
- Acherontia atropos (Linnaeus, 1758)
- Agrius convolvuli (Linnaeus, 1758)
- Andriasa contraria Walker, 1856
- Basiothia medea (Fabricius, 1781)
- Cephonodes hylas (Linnaeus, 1771)
- Cephonodes trochilus (Guérin-Méneville, 1843)
- Ceridia heuglini (C. & R. Felder, 1874)
- Chaerocina jordani Berio, 1938
- Hippotion celerio (Linnaeus, 1758)
- Hippotion dexippus Fawcett, 1915
- Hippotion rebeli Rothschild & Jordan, 1903
- Hippotion roseipennis (Butler, 1882)
- Lophostethus dumolinii (Angas, 1849)
- Nephele accentifera (Palisot de Beauvois, 1821)
- Nephele vau (Walker, 1856)
- Rufoclanis rosea (Druce, 1882)
- Theretra cajus (Cramer, 1777)
- Theretra capensis (Linnaeus, 1764)

== Tortricidae ==
- Cryptophlebia peltastica (Meyrick, 1921)

== Zygaenidae ==
- Saliunca ignicincta de Joannis, 1912
