= Teracotona uhrikmeszarosi =

Scientific classification
- Kingdom: Animalia
- Phylum: Arthropoda
- Class: Insecta
- Order: Lepidoptera
- Superfamily: Noctuoidea
- Family: Erebidae
- Subfamily: Arctiinae
- Genus: Teracotona
- Species: T. uhrikmeszarosi

Binomial name
- Teracotona uhrikmeszarosi Szent-Ivany, 1942

Species of moth

Teracotona uhrikmeszarosi is a moth in the family Erebidae. It was described by Szent-Ivany in 1942. It is found in Tanzania.
