= Digama insulana =

Scientific classification
- Domain: Eukaryota
- Kingdom: Animalia
- Phylum: Arthropoda
- Class: Insecta
- Order: Lepidoptera
- Superfamily: Noctuoidea
- Family: Erebidae
- Genus: Digama
- Species: D. insulana

Binomial name
- Digama insulana Felder, 1868

Species of moth

Digama insulana is a moth of the family Erebidae described by Rudolf Felder in 1868. It is found in India, Sri Lanka and Vietnam.

== Description ==
The wingspan is 24–29 mm. Antennae of male bipectinated (comb like on both sides) where terminal one-fifth is ciliated (hair like). Forewings with a fold on inner margin on upperside. Head and thorax brownish fuscous and abdomen orange yellow. Differs from Digama hearseyana in the collar being without spots. Forewing without the fuscous suffusion or bands. The third costal black spot from base and the second in the interno-median interspace is absent. Hindwing with some fuscous on outer margin at veins two and three.
