= D. plicata =

D. plicata may refer to:

- Dolomena plicata, the pigeon conch, a sea snail species
- Digama plicata, a moth species found in Africa

== See also ==
- Plicata (disambiguation)
