= Pandesma decaryi =

Scientific classification
- Domain: Eukaryota
- Kingdom: Animalia
- Phylum: Arthropoda
- Class: Insecta
- Order: Lepidoptera
- Superfamily: Noctuoidea
- Family: Erebidae
- Genus: Pandesma
- Species: P. decaryi

Binomial name
- Pandesma decaryi Viette, 1966

Synonyms
- Thria malgassica Berio, 1966

Species of moth

Pandesma decaryi is a moth of the family Erebidae. It is native to central & south-western Madagascar.

Berio described this species in 1966 as looking very similar to Pandesma anysa Guenée, 1852 as found in Eritrea. It has a wingspan of 38mm.
