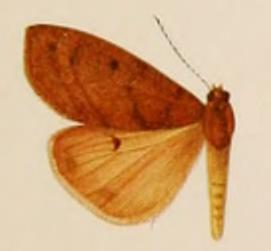

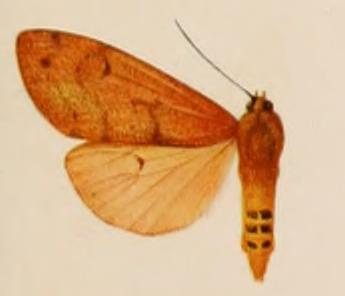

Scientific classification
- Kingdom: Animalia
- Phylum: Arthropoda
- Class: Insecta
- Order: Lepidoptera
- Superfamily: Noctuoidea
- Family: Erebidae
- Subfamily: Arctiinae
- Genus: Teracotona
- Species: T. jacksoni

Binomial name
- Teracotona jacksoni (Rothschild, 1910)

Synonyms
- Seirarctia jacksoni Rothschild, 1910; Teracotona (Neoteracotona) jacksoni; Seirarctia jacsoni Hampson, 1920

= Teracotona jacksoni =

Species of moth

Teracotona jacksoni is a moth of the family Erebidae. It is found in Ethiopia and Kenya.
