= Digama spilosomoides =

Scientific classification
- Kingdom: Animalia
- Phylum: Arthropoda
- Class: Insecta
- Order: Lepidoptera
- Superfamily: Noctuoidea
- Family: Erebidae
- Genus: Digama
- Species: D. spilosomoides

Binomial name
- Digama spilosomoides (Walker, 1865)

Synonyms
- Bithra spilosomoides Walker, 1865

Species of insect

Digama spilosomoides is a moth of the family Erebidae. It is found in Africa, including South Africa.
