= Phiala bergeri =

Scientific classification
- Kingdom: Animalia
- Phylum: Arthropoda
- Clade: Pancrustacea
- Class: Insecta
- Order: Lepidoptera
- Family: Eupterotidae
- Genus: Phiala
- Species: P. bergeri

Binomial name
- Phiala bergeri Rougeot, 1975

Species of moth

Phiala bergeri is a moth in the family Eupterotidae. It was described by Rougeot in 1975. It is found in Ethiopia.
