= Phiala flavipennis =

Scientific classification
- Kingdom: Animalia
- Phylum: Arthropoda
- Clade: Pancrustacea
- Class: Insecta
- Order: Lepidoptera
- Family: Eupterotidae
- Genus: Phiala
- Species: P. flavipennis

Binomial name
- Phiala flavipennis Wallengren, 1875

Species of moth

Phiala flavipennis is a moth in the family Eupterotidae. It was described by Wallengren in 1875. It is found in South Africa.
