= Digama serratula =

Scientific classification
- Domain: Eukaryota
- Kingdom: Animalia
- Phylum: Arthropoda
- Class: Insecta
- Order: Lepidoptera
- Superfamily: Noctuoidea
- Family: Erebidae
- Genus: Digama
- Species: D. serratula

Binomial name
- Digama serratula Talbot, 1932

Species of moth

Digama serratula is a moth of the family Erebidae. It is found in Africa, including Kenya.
