= Teracotona senegalensis =

Scientific classification
- Domain: Eukaryota
- Kingdom: Animalia
- Phylum: Arthropoda
- Class: Insecta
- Order: Lepidoptera
- Superfamily: Noctuoidea
- Family: Erebidae
- Subfamily: Arctiinae
- Genus: Teracotona
- Species: T. senegalensis

Binomial name
- Teracotona senegalensis Rothschild, 1933

Species of moth

Teracotona senegalensis is a moth in the family Erebidae. It was described by Rothschild in 1933. It is found in Senegal and Gambia.
