= Phiala polita =

Scientific classification
- Kingdom: Animalia
- Phylum: Arthropoda
- Clade: Pancrustacea
- Class: Insecta
- Order: Lepidoptera
- Family: Eupterotidae
- Genus: Phiala
- Species: P. polita

Binomial name
- Phiala polita Distant, 1897

Species of moth

Phiala polita is a moth in the family Eupterotidae. It was described by William Lucas Distant in 1897. It is found in Mpumalanga, South Africa.

The wingspan is 40 mm. The wings are pale bright ochraceous, the forewings speckled with black obliquely beneath the cell, near the centre of the inner margin and near posterior the half of the outer margin. The hindwings have two or three speckles near the outer margin.
