= Phiala pretoriana =

Scientific classification
- Kingdom: Animalia
- Phylum: Arthropoda
- Clade: Pancrustacea
- Class: Insecta
- Order: Lepidoptera
- Family: Eupterotidae
- Genus: Phiala
- Species: P. pretoriana

Binomial name
- Phiala pretoriana Wichgraf, 1908

Species of moth

Phiala pretoriana is a moth in the family of Eupterotidae. It was described by Wichgraf in 1908. It is found in South Africa (Gauteng).
