= Phiala unistriga =

Scientific classification
- Kingdom: Animalia
- Phylum: Arthropoda
- Clade: Pancrustacea
- Class: Insecta
- Order: Lepidoptera
- Family: Eupterotidae
- Genus: Phiala
- Species: P. unistriga

Binomial name
- Phiala unistriga Gaede, 1927

Species of moth

Phiala unistriga is a moth in the family Eupterotidae. It was described by Max Gaede in 1927 and is found in Malawi.
