= Teracotona translucens =

Scientific classification
- Kingdom: Animalia
- Phylum: Arthropoda
- Clade: Pancrustacea
- Class: Insecta
- Order: Lepidoptera
- Superfamily: Noctuoidea
- Family: Erebidae
- Subfamily: Arctiinae
- Genus: Teracotona
- Species: T. translucens

Binomial name
- Teracotona translucens (Grünberg, 1907)

Synonyms
- Seirarctia translucens Grünberg, 1907; Teracotona subflava Joicey & Talbot, 1924

Species of moth

Teracotona translucens is a moth in the family Erebidae. It was described by Karl Grünberg in 1907. It is found in the Democratic Republic of the Congo, Malawi, Rwanda, Tanzania and Uganda.
