= Phiala pulverea =

Scientific classification
- Kingdom: Animalia
- Phylum: Arthropoda
- Clade: Pancrustacea
- Class: Insecta
- Order: Lepidoptera
- Family: Eupterotidae
- Genus: Phiala
- Species: P. pulverea

Binomial name
- Phiala pulverea Distant, 1903

Species of moth

Phiala pulverea is a moth in the family Eupterotidae. It was described by William Lucas Distant in 1903. It is found in South Africa.

The wingspan is 37–38 mm. The wings are silvery white, thickly covered with minute blackish speckles, except on the discoidal cell of the forewings, where they are only present at the apex. The underside of the wings is very pale ochraceous, speckled with blackish as above.
