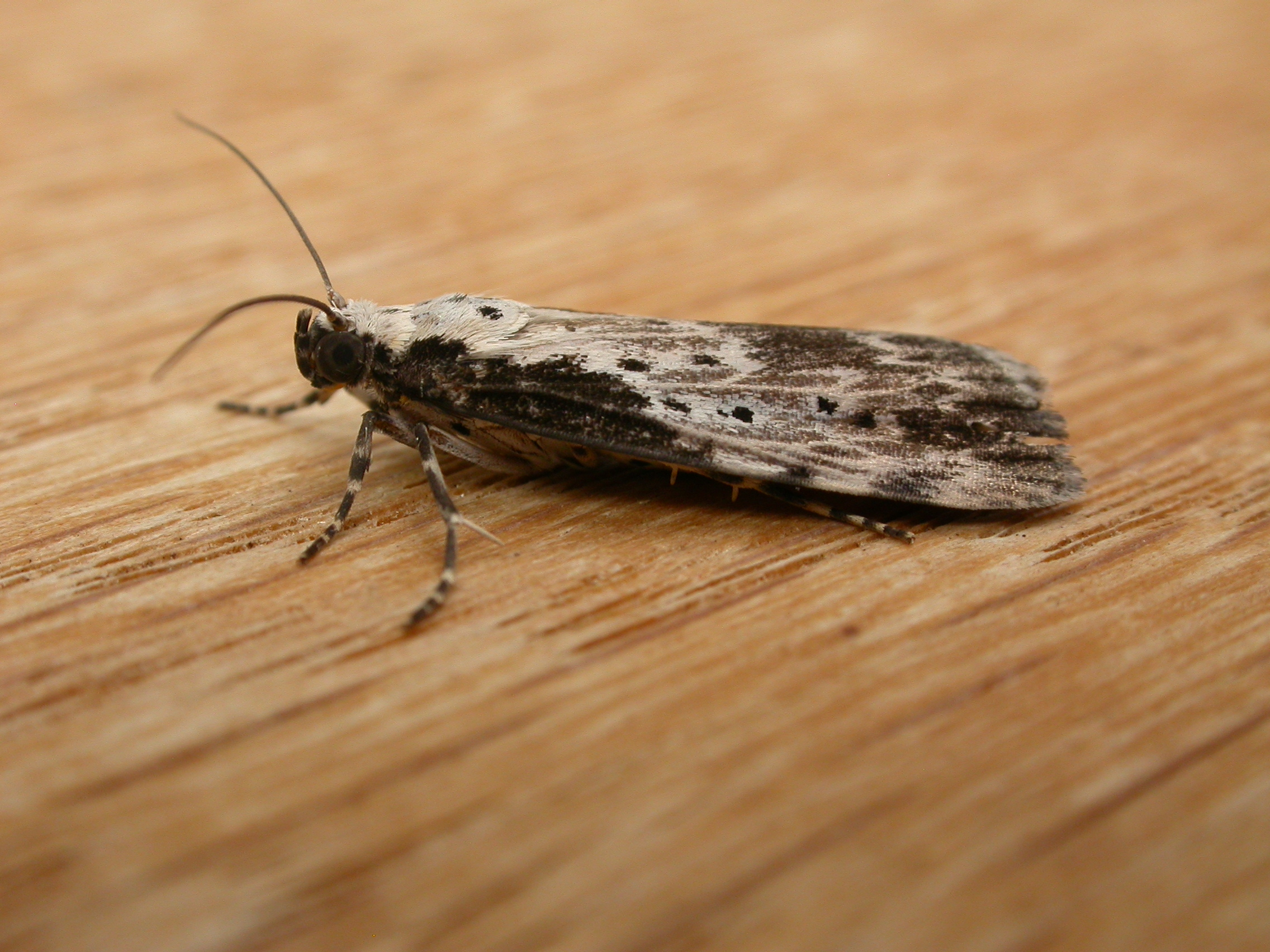
- Digama marmorea

Scientific classification
- Kingdom: Animalia
- Phylum: Arthropoda
- Clade: Pancrustacea
- Class: Insecta
- Order: Lepidoptera
- Superfamily: Noctuoidea
- Family: Erebidae
- Subfamily: Aganainae
- Genus: Digama; Moore, 1858

Synonyms
- Bithra Walker, 1865; Homoeognatha Felder, 1874; Sommeria Hübner, 1831

= Digama =

Genus of moths

Digama is a genus of moths in the family Erebidae described by Frederic Moore in 1858. It is distributed in South Africa, China, throughout India, Sri Lanka, Myanmar and Australia.

== Taxonomy ==
The genus was formerly placed in the Arctiidae and the Noctuidae by different authors.

== Description ==
Palpi upturned with second joint reaching vertex of head and long third joint. Forewings square and rather short. Vein 5 from just above lower angle of cell. Vein 6 from just below the upper angle. Veins 7 and 10 from a short areole. Hindwings with vein 5 from above lower angle of cell. Veins 6 and 7 are stalked.

== Species ==
- Digama abietis Leech, 1889
- Digama africana Swinhoe, 1907
- Digama aganais Felder, 1874
- Digama budonga Bethume-Baker, 1913
- Digama burmana Hampson, 1892
- Digama costimacula Swinhoe, 1907
- Digama culta Hübner, 1825
- Digama daressalamica Strand, 1911
- Digama fasciata Butler, 1877
- Digama hearseyana Moore, 1859
- Digama insulana Felder, 1868
- Digama lithosioides Swinhoe, 1907
- Digama malgassica Toulgoët, 1954
- Digama marchalii Guerin, 1843
- Digama marmorea Butler, 1877
- Digama meridionalis Swinhoe, 1907
- Digama ostentata Distant, 1899
- Digama pandaensis Romieux, 1935
- Digama plicata Pinhey, 1952
- Digama rileyi Kiriakoff, 1958
- Digama sagittata Gaede, 1926
- Digama septempuncta Hampson, 1910
- Digama serratula Talbot, 1932
- Digama sinuosa Hampson, 1905
- Digama spilosoma Felder, 1874
- Digama spilosomoides Walker, 1865
- Digama strabonis Hampson, 1910
