= Digama abietis =

Scientific classification
- Domain: Eukaryota
- Kingdom: Animalia
- Phylum: Arthropoda
- Class: Insecta
- Order: Lepidoptera
- Superfamily: Noctuoidea
- Family: Erebidae
- Genus: Digama
- Species: D. abietis

Binomial name
- Digama abietis Leech, 1889

Species of moth

Digama abietis is a moth of the family Erebidae. It is found in China.

The wingspan is about 29 mm.
