= Janomima =

Scientific classification
- Kingdom: Animalia
- Phylum: Arthropoda
- Class: Insecta
- Order: Lepidoptera
- Family: Eupterotidae
- Subfamily: Eupterotinae
- Genus: Janomima; Aurivillius, 1901

Genus of moths

Janomima is a genus of moths in the family Eupterotidae.

== Species ==
- Janomima dannfelti Aurivillius, 1893
- Janomima ibandana Dall'Asta, 1979
- Janomima mariana White, 1843

== Former species ==
- Janomima karschi Weyman., 1903
- Janomima mesundulata Strand, 1911
- Janomima westwoodi Aurivillius, 1901
