= Phiala aurivillii =

Scientific classification
- Kingdom: Animalia
- Phylum: Arthropoda
- Clade: Pancrustacea
- Class: Insecta
- Order: Lepidoptera
- Family: Eupterotidae
- Genus: Phiala
- Species: P. aurivillii

Binomial name
- Phiala aurivillii (Bethune-Baker, 1915)

Synonyms
- Stybolepis aurivillii Bethune-Baker, 1915

Species of moth

Phiala aurivillii is a moth in the family Eupterotidae. It was described by George Thomas Bethune-Baker in 1915. It is found in Zambia.

The wingspan is 58 mm. The forewings are greyish white, with a broad stripe of black scales filling the cell and beyond it. There is an oblique curved stripe of similar scales in the postmedian area and a trace of a subterminal one much interrupted. The hindwings are greyish white, with a slight patch of thin grey scales in the cellular area and a trace of a scaled greyish postmedial stripe.
