= Teracotona euprepia =

Scientific classification
- Kingdom: Animalia
- Phylum: Arthropoda
- Class: Insecta
- Order: Lepidoptera
- Superfamily: Noctuoidea
- Family: Erebidae
- Subfamily: Arctiinae
- Genus: Teracotona
- Species: T. euprepia

Binomial name
- Teracotona euprepia Hampson, 1900

Species of moth

Teracotona euprepia is a moth in the family Erebidae. It was described by George Hampson in 1900. It is found in Angola, the Democratic Republic of the Congo, Malawi, South Africa, Tanzania, Uganda and Zimbabwe.

== Subspecies ==
- Teracotona euprepia euprepia
- Teracotona euprepia bicolor Toulgoët, 1980 (Malawi, Tanzania)
