= Phiala simplex =

Scientific classification
- Kingdom: Animalia
- Phylum: Arthropoda
- Clade: Pancrustacea
- Class: Insecta
- Order: Lepidoptera
- Family: Eupterotidae
- Genus: Phiala
- Species: P. simplex

Binomial name
- Phiala simplex Aurivillius, 1904

Species of moth

Phiala simplex is a moth in the family Eupterotidae. It was described by Per Olof Christopher Aurivillius in 1904. It is found in the Democratic Republic of the Congo (Katanga), Malawi and Zimbabwe.

The wingspan is 46 mm. The wings are snow white, beyond the middle about 6 mm from the margin with a fine transverse line composed of black scales. This line is nearly erect in the forewings, gently arched and somewhat waved in the hindwings.
