= Digama malgassica =

Scientific classification
- Kingdom: Animalia
- Phylum: Arthropoda
- Class: Insecta
- Order: Lepidoptera
- Superfamily: Noctuoidea
- Family: Erebidae
- Genus: Digama
- Species: D. malgassica

Binomial name
- Digama malgassica Toulgoët, 1954

Species of moth

Digama malgassica is a moth of the family Erebidae first described by Hervé de Toulgoët in 1954. It is found in Madagascar.
