= Phiala incana =

Scientific classification
- Kingdom: Animalia
- Phylum: Arthropoda
- Clade: Pancrustacea
- Class: Insecta
- Order: Lepidoptera
- Family: Eupterotidae
- Genus: Phiala
- Species: P. incana

Binomial name
- Phiala incana Distant, 1897

Synonyms
- Phiala arrecta Distant, 1899

Species of moth

Phiala incana is a moth in the family Eupterotidae. It was described by William Lucas Distant in 1897. It is found in South Africa (Gauteng).

The wingspan is 44 mm. The wings are milky white, the forewings obscurely, sparingly and irregularly speckled with dark fuscous. The hindwings have a few scattered discal speckles of dark fuscous.
