= Teracotona pallida =

Scientific classification
- Domain: Eukaryota
- Kingdom: Animalia
- Phylum: Arthropoda
- Class: Insecta
- Order: Lepidoptera
- Superfamily: Noctuoidea
- Family: Erebidae
- Subfamily: Arctiinae
- Genus: Teracotona
- Species: T. pallida

Binomial name
- Teracotona pallida Joicey & Talbot, 1924

Species of moth

Teracotona pallida is a moth in the family Erebidae. It was described by James John Joicey and George Talbot in 1924. It is found in Rwanda.
