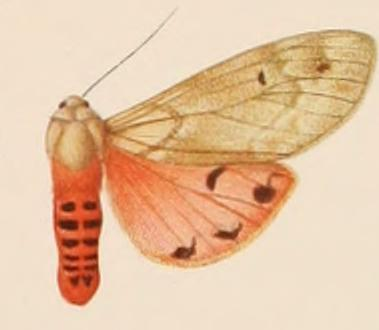

Scientific classification
- Kingdom: Animalia
- Phylum: Arthropoda
- Class: Insecta
- Order: Lepidoptera
- Superfamily: Noctuoidea
- Family: Erebidae
- Subfamily: Arctiinae
- Genus: Teracotona
- Species: T. quadripunctata

Binomial name
- Teracotona quadripunctata Wichgraf, 1908

Synonyms
- Teracotona rhodophaea quadripunctata Wichgraf, 1908; Teracotona rhodophaea f. obscurior Wichgraf, 1908; Teracotona buryi Rothschild, 1910

= Teracotona quadripunctata =

Species of moth

Teracotona quadripunctata is a moth of the family Erebidae first described by Wichgraf in 1908. It is found in Togo, Ghana and Nigeria.
