= Teracotona pitmanni =

Scientific classification
- Domain: Eukaryota
- Kingdom: Animalia
- Phylum: Arthropoda
- Class: Insecta
- Order: Lepidoptera
- Superfamily: Noctuoidea
- Family: Erebidae
- Subfamily: Arctiinae
- Genus: Teracotona
- Species: T. pitmanni

Binomial name
- Teracotona pitmanni Rothschild, 1933

Species of moth

Teracotona pitmanni is a moth in the family Erebidae. It was described by Rothschild in 1933. It is found in Kenya.

== Subspecies ==
- Teracotona pitmanni pitmanni
- Teracotona pitmanni major Rothschild, 1933
