= Digama daressalamica =

Scientific classification
- Kingdom: Animalia
- Phylum: Arthropoda
- Class: Insecta
- Order: Lepidoptera
- Superfamily: Noctuoidea
- Family: Erebidae
- Genus: Digama
- Species: D. daressalamica

Binomial name
- Digama daressalamica Strand, 1911

Species of moth

Digama daressalamica is a moth of the family Erebidae. It is found in Africa.
