= Digama ostentata =

Scientific classification
- Domain: Eukaryota
- Kingdom: Animalia
- Phylum: Arthropoda
- Class: Insecta
- Order: Lepidoptera
- Superfamily: Noctuoidea
- Family: Erebidae
- Genus: Digama
- Species: D. ostentata

Binomial name
- Digama ostentata Distant, 1899

Species of moth

Digama ostentata is a moth of the family Erebidae. It is found in Africa, and is most commonly seen in Botswana, Mozambique, Namibia, South Africa, and Zimbabwe.
