= Teracotona approximans =

Scientific classification
- Kingdom: Animalia
- Phylum: Arthropoda
- Clade: Pancrustacea
- Class: Insecta
- Order: Lepidoptera
- Superfamily: Noctuoidea
- Family: Erebidae
- Subfamily: Arctiinae
- Genus: Teracotona
- Species: T. approximans

Binomial name
- Teracotona approximans (Rothschild, 1917)

Synonyms
- Seirarctia approcimans Rothschild, 1917

Species of moth

Teracotona approximans is a moth in the family Erebidae. It was described by Rothschild in 1917. It is found in Kenya, Malawi, Tanzania and Uganda.
