= Phiala fuscodorsata =

Scientific classification
- Kingdom: Animalia
- Phylum: Arthropoda
- Clade: Pancrustacea
- Class: Insecta
- Order: Lepidoptera
- Family: Eupterotidae
- Genus: Phiala
- Species: P. fuscodorsata

Binomial name
- Phiala fuscodorsata Aurivillius, 1904

Species of moth

Phiala fuscodorsata is a moth in the family Eupterotidae. It was described by Per Olof Christopher Aurivillius in 1904. It is found in Kenya.

The wingspan is 34 mm. The wings are greyish white, the forewings with an oblique, slightly outcurved black line from the middle of the hindmargin to the costa near the apex, broader at the hind margin, thickened at the veins and broken into spots at the apex. There are also many black scales on the median and submedian veins between the base and the transverse line. The hindwings have a slightly curved series of black spots beyond the middle.
