= Phiala marshalli =

Scientific classification
- Kingdom: Animalia
- Phylum: Arthropoda
- Clade: Pancrustacea
- Class: Insecta
- Order: Lepidoptera
- Family: Eupterotidae
- Genus: Phiala
- Species: P. marshalli

Binomial name
- Phiala marshalli Aurivillius, 1904

Synonyms
- Phiala reussi Strand, 1911

Species of moth

Phiala marshalli is a moth in the family Eupterotidae. It was described by Per Olof Christopher Aurivillius in 1904. It is found in the Democratic Republic of the Congo (Katanga), Tanzania and Zimbabwe.

The wingspan is 35–41 mm. The wings are very pale sulphur yellow or sometimes pure white, the forewings with seven to eight black spots beyond the middle on veins one to seven and on the fold in the submedian interspace. The spots are disposed in an oblique nearly straight or slightly incurved line. The hindwings have a nearly straight, transverse series of six to seven small black spots beyond the middle.
