= Teracotona alicia =

Scientific classification
- Kingdom: Animalia
- Phylum: Arthropoda
- Class: Insecta
- Order: Lepidoptera
- Superfamily: Noctuoidea
- Family: Erebidae
- Subfamily: Arctiinae
- Genus: Teracotona
- Species: T. alicia

Binomial name
- Teracotona alicia (Hampson, 1911)

Synonyms
- Seirarctia alicia Hampson, 1911

Species of moth

Teracotona alicia is a moth in the family Erebidae. It was described by George Hampson in 1911. It is found in Kenya.
