= Teracotona metaxantha =

Scientific classification
- Kingdom: Animalia
- Phylum: Arthropoda
- Class: Insecta
- Order: Lepidoptera
- Superfamily: Noctuoidea
- Family: Erebidae
- Subfamily: Arctiinae
- Genus: Teracotona
- Species: T. metaxantha

Binomial name
- Teracotona metaxantha (Hampson, 1920)

Synonyms
- Seirarctia metaxantha Hampson, 1920

Species of moth

Teracotona metaxantha is a moth in the family Erebidae. It was described by George Hampson in 1920. It is found in South Africa and Zimbabwe.
