= Phiala infuscata =

Scientific classification
- Kingdom: Animalia
- Phylum: Arthropoda
- Clade: Pancrustacea
- Class: Insecta
- Order: Lepidoptera
- Family: Eupterotidae
- Genus: Phiala
- Species: P. infuscata

Binomial name
- Phiala infuscata (Grünberg, 1907)

Synonyms
- Stibolepis infuscata Grünberg, 1907

Species of moth

Phiala infuscata is a moth in the family Eupterotidae. It was described by Karl Grünberg in 1907. It is found in Tanzania.
