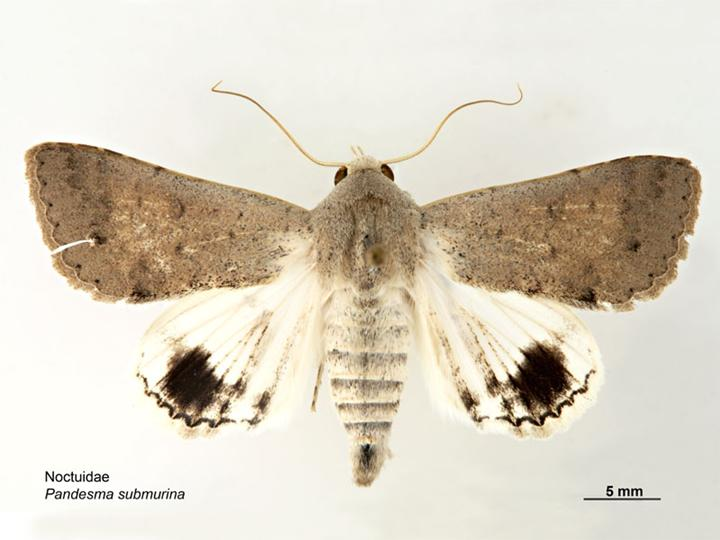
- Dorsal view
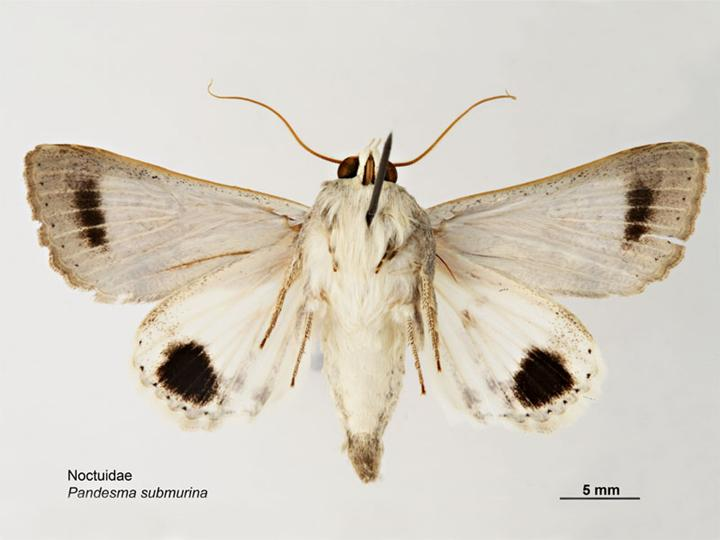
- Ventral view

Scientific classification
- Kingdom: Animalia
- Phylum: Arthropoda
- Clade: Pancrustacea
- Class: Insecta
- Order: Lepidoptera
- Superfamily: Noctuoidea
- Family: Erebidae
- Genus: Pandesma
- Species: P. submurina

Binomial name
- Pandesma submurina (Walker, 1865)

Synonyms
- Michera submurina Walker, 1865

= Pandesma submurina =

Species of moth

Pandesma submurina, the pale migrant, is a moth of the family Erebidae first described by Francis Walker in 1865. It is found in Australia in New South Wales, the Northern Territory, Queensland and Western Australia.

The wingspan is about 50 mm.

The larvae probably feed on Fabaceae species.
