= Pandesma quenavadi =

Scientific classification
- Domain: Eukaryota
- Kingdom: Animalia
- Phylum: Arthropoda
- Class: Insecta
- Order: Lepidoptera
- Superfamily: Noctuoidea
- Family: Erebidae
- Genus: Pandesma
- Species: P. quenavadi

Binomial name
- Pandesma quenavadi Guenée, 1852

Synonyms
- Pandesma jubra Swinhoe, 1889

Species of moth

Pandesma quenavadi is a moth of the family Noctuidae first described by Achille Guenée in 1852. It has a wide distribution and is found in African countries such as the Democratic Republic of the Congo, Egypt, the Gambia, Kenya, Madagascar, Malawi, Namibia, Somalia, South Africa, Sudan, Tanzania, Uganda, Zambia and Zimbabwe. It is also found in South Asian and South East Asian countries like Sri Lanka, Bangladesh, Taiwan, Myanmar, Thailand, Sumatra, Borneo, Java, the Philippines, Australia and Japan.

Its wingspan is about 5 cm. Its narrow forewings are greyish with a broad, darker border. There is light and irregular basal fasciation. A small dark spot is found centrally in the antemedial area. Hindwings whitish with a broad blackish-grey border. This border is darker than the one on the forewings. Larval food plants are Acasia catechu, Acacia karoo, Acacia mollissima, Albiza chinensis and Albiza lebbeck.
