= Teracotona murtafaa =

Scientific classification
- Kingdom: Animalia
- Phylum: Arthropoda
- Clade: Pancrustacea
- Class: Insecta
- Order: Lepidoptera
- Superfamily: Noctuoidea
- Family: Erebidae
- Subfamily: Arctiinae
- Genus: Teracotona
- Species: T. murtafaa

Binomial name
- Teracotona murtafaa Wiltshire, 1980

Species of moth

Teracotona murtafaa is a moth in the family Erebidae. It was described by Wiltshire in 1980. It is found in Oman.
