= Phiala punctulata =

Scientific classification
- Kingdom: Animalia
- Phylum: Arthropoda
- Clade: Pancrustacea
- Class: Insecta
- Order: Lepidoptera
- Family: Eupterotidae
- Genus: Phiala
- Species: P. punctulata

Binomial name
- Phiala punctulata Pagenstecher, 1903

Synonyms
- Pachymeta nyassana Strand, 1909

Species of moth

Phiala punctulata is a moth in the family Eupterotidae. It was described by Pagenstecher in 1903. It is found in Malawi and Somalia.
