= Phiala albidorsata =

Scientific classification
- Kingdom: Animalia
- Phylum: Arthropoda
- Clade: Pancrustacea
- Class: Insecta
- Order: Lepidoptera
- Family: Eupterotidae
- Genus: Phiala
- Species: P. albidorsata

Binomial name
- Phiala albidorsata Gaede, 1927

Species of moth

Phiala albidorsata is a moth in the family Eupterotidae. It was described by Max Gaede in 1927. It is found in Botswana, Mozambique, Zambia and Zimbabwe.
