= Phiala cubicularis =

Scientific classification
- Kingdom: Animalia
- Phylum: Arthropoda
- Clade: Pancrustacea
- Class: Insecta
- Order: Lepidoptera
- Family: Eupterotidae
- Genus: Phiala
- Species: P. cubicularis

Binomial name
- Phiala cubicularis Strand, 1911

Species of moth

Phiala cubicularis is a moth in the family Eupterotidae. It was described by Strand in 1911. It is found in the Democratic Republic of Congo and Tanzania.
