= Digama burmana =

Scientific classification
- Kingdom: Animalia
- Phylum: Arthropoda
- Class: Insecta
- Order: Lepidoptera
- Superfamily: Noctuoidea
- Family: Erebidae
- Genus: Digama
- Species: D. burmana

Binomial name
- Digama burmana Hampson, 1892

Species of moth

Digama burmana is a moth of the family Erebidae. It is found in Myanmar.
