= Phiala cunina =

Scientific classification
- Kingdom: Animalia
- Phylum: Arthropoda
- Clade: Pancrustacea
- Class: Insecta
- Order: Lepidoptera
- Family: Eupterotidae
- Genus: Phiala
- Species: P. cunina

Binomial name
- Phiala cunina (Cramer, 1780)

Synonyms
- Phalaena Attacus cunina Cramer, 1780; Phiala fervidaria Fabricius, 1787; Stibolepis nivea Butler, 1878

Species of moth

Phiala cunina is a moth in the family Eupterotidae. It was described by Pieter Cramer in 1780. It is found in Cameroon, Nigeria and Sierra Leone.

Adults are snowy white, the wings with black external borders traversed by a deeply dentate-sinuate white line. There is a series of black spots on the forewings, interrupted on the median interspaces, close to the external border. The costal border is crossed by black dashes, the four nearest the base continued as grey and ill-defined stripes across the wing. The hindwings have a subcostal black dash close to the external border.
