= Phiala albida =

Scientific classification
- Kingdom: Animalia
- Phylum: Arthropoda
- Clade: Pancrustacea
- Class: Insecta
- Order: Lepidoptera
- Family: Eupterotidae
- Genus: Phiala
- Species: P. albida

Binomial name
- Phiala albida (Plötz, 1880)

Synonyms
- Phricodia albida Plötz, 1880; Stibolepis abluta Holland, 1893; Stibolepis sylvia Druce, 1886

Species of moth

Phiala albida is a moth in the family Eupterotidae. It was described by Plötz in 1880. It is found in the Central African Republic and Cameroon.
