= Teracotona pardalina =

Scientific classification
- Domain: Eukaryota
- Kingdom: Animalia
- Phylum: Arthropoda
- Class: Insecta
- Order: Lepidoptera
- Superfamily: Noctuoidea
- Family: Erebidae
- Subfamily: Arctiinae
- Genus: Teracotona
- Species: T. pardalina

Binomial name
- Teracotona pardalina Bartel, 1903

Synonyms
- Teracotona flavipennis Bartel, 1903; Teracotona flavipennis ab. rufipennis Strand, 1909

Species of moth

Teracotona pardalina is a moth in the family Erebidae. It was described by Max Bartel in 1903. It is found in Angola, the Democratic Republic of the Congo, Ivory Coast, Kenya, South Africa, Tanzania and Uganda.
