= Phiala crassistriga =

Scientific classification
- Kingdom: Animalia
- Phylum: Arthropoda
- Clade: Pancrustacea
- Class: Insecta
- Order: Lepidoptera
- Family: Eupterotidae
- Genus: Phiala
- Species: P. crassistriga

Binomial name
- Phiala crassistriga Strand, 1911

Synonyms
- Phiala incurva Aurivillius, 1915

Species of moth

Phiala crassistriga is a moth in the family Eupterotidae. It was described by Embrik Strand in 1911. It is found in the Democratic Republic of Congo (North Kivu), Malawi and Tanzania.
