= Teracotona wittei =

Scientific classification
- Domain: Eukaryota
- Kingdom: Animalia
- Phylum: Arthropoda
- Class: Insecta
- Order: Lepidoptera
- Superfamily: Noctuoidea
- Family: Erebidae
- Subfamily: Arctiinae
- Genus: Teracotona
- Species: T. wittei

Binomial name
- Teracotona wittei (Debauche, 1942)

Synonyms
- Seirarctia wittei Debauche, 1942

Species of moth

Teracotona wittei is a moth in the family Erebidae. It was described by Hubert Robert Debauche in 1942. It is found in the Democratic Republic of the Congo, Rwanda and Uganda.
