= Janomima ibandana =

Scientific classification
- Kingdom: Animalia
- Phylum: Arthropoda
- Class: Insecta
- Order: Lepidoptera
- Family: Eupterotidae
- Genus: Janomima
- Species: J. ibandana

Binomial name
- Janomima ibandana Dall'Asta, 1979

Species of moth

Janomima ibandana is a moth in the family Eupterotidae. It was described by Ugo Dall'Asta in 1979. It is found in the Democratic Republic of Congo.
