= Digama rileyi =

Scientific classification
- Kingdom: Animalia
- Phylum: Arthropoda
- Class: Insecta
- Order: Lepidoptera
- Superfamily: Noctuoidea
- Family: Erebidae
- Genus: Digama
- Species: D. rileyi

Binomial name
- Digama rileyi (Kiriakoff, 1958)

Synonyms
- Secusio rileyi Kiriakoff, 1958

Species of moth

Digama rileyi is a moth of the family Erebidae. It is found in Africa, including Uganda.
