= Phiala esomelana =

Scientific classification
- Kingdom: Animalia
- Phylum: Arthropoda
- Clade: Pancrustacea
- Class: Insecta
- Order: Lepidoptera
- Family: Eupterotidae
- Genus: Phiala
- Species: P. esomelana

Binomial name
- Phiala esomelana (Bethune-Baker, 1927)

Synonyms
- Euchera esomelana Bethune-Baker, 1927

Species of moth

Phiala esomelana is a moth in the family Eupterotidae. It was described by George Thomas Bethune-Baker in 1927. It is found in Cameroon.

The wingspan is 60–64 mm for males and about 58 mm for females. The forewings, costa and outer half of the males are black, the basal portion below the costal vein white and with all the wings somewhat hyaline. The hindwings are white, with the outer margin black, invading the nervures and so scalloping the black margin. Both wings of the females are white, subhyaline and with the outer margins black and scalloped along the veins. There are traces of an interrupted black transverse postmedian band on the forewings.
