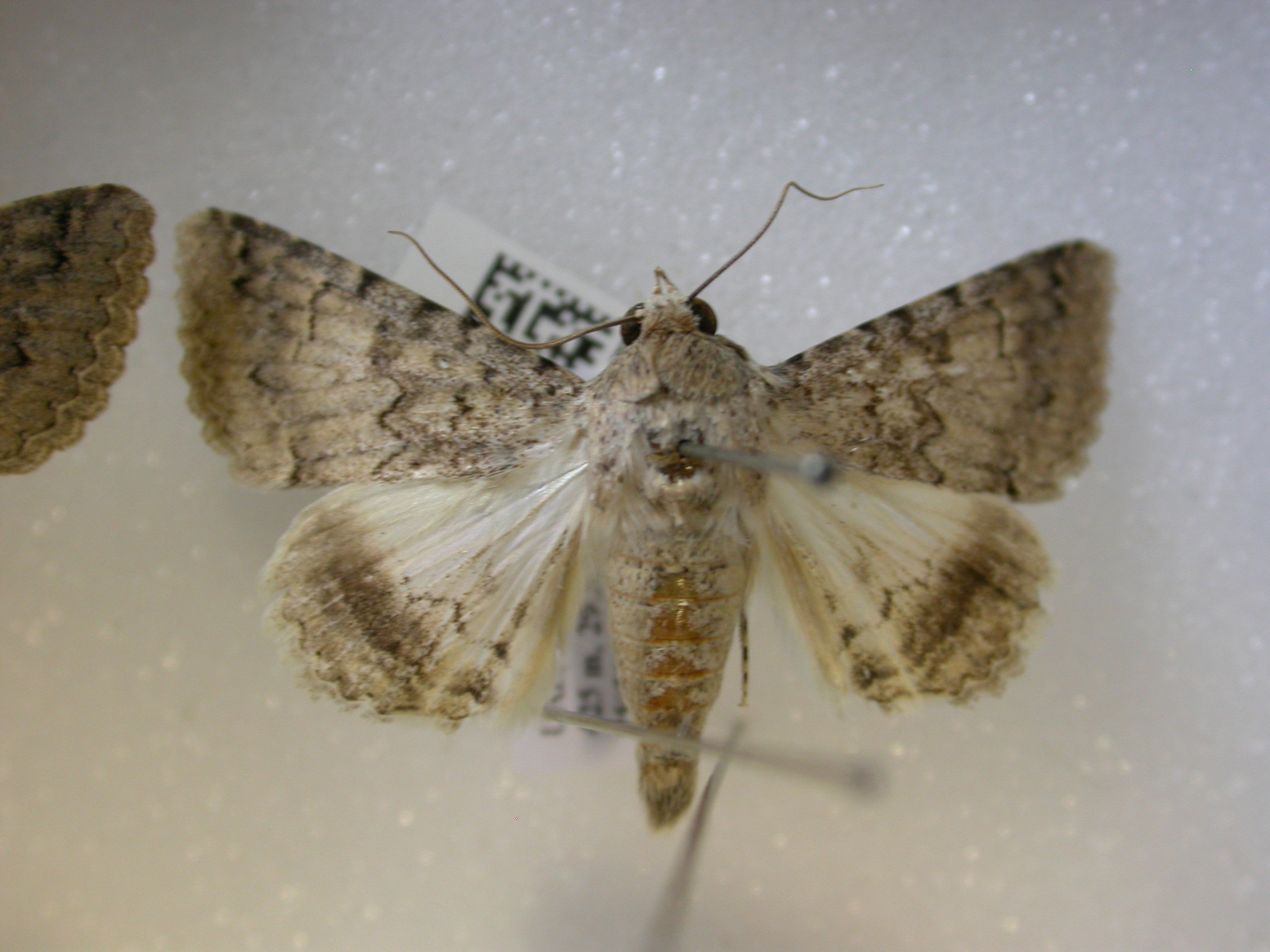

Scientific classification
- Domain: Eukaryota
- Kingdom: Animalia
- Phylum: Arthropoda
- Class: Insecta
- Order: Lepidoptera
- Superfamily: Noctuoidea
- Family: Erebidae
- Genus: Pandesma
- Species: P. robusta

Binomial name
- Pandesma robusta (Walker, 1858)

Synonyms
- Thria robusta; Pandesma opposita; Pandesma sennaarensis; Pandesma grandis; Pandesma terrigena; Pandesma distincta

= Pandesma robusta =

Species of moth

Pandesma robusta is a species of moth of the family Erebidae. It is found in Portugal, Spain, Malta, Sicily, Greece, Crete, the Canary Islands, throughout Africa and from Asia Minor to India and Pakistan.

Adults are on wing year round. There are multiple generations per year.

The larvae feed on Acacia, Albizzia lebbek and Populus euphratica.
