= Digama pandaensis =

Scientific classification
- Domain: Eukaryota
- Kingdom: Animalia
- Phylum: Arthropoda
- Class: Insecta
- Order: Lepidoptera
- Superfamily: Noctuoidea
- Family: Erebidae
- Genus: Digama
- Species: D. pandaensis

Binomial name
- Digama pandaensis Romieux, 1935

Species of moth

Digama pandaensis is a moth of the family Erebidae first described by Romieux in 1935. It is found in Africa, including Zaire.
