= Teracotona submaculata =

Scientific classification
- Kingdom: Animalia
- Phylum: Arthropoda
- Class: Insecta
- Order: Lepidoptera
- Superfamily: Noctuoidea
- Family: Erebidae
- Subfamily: Arctiinae
- Genus: Teracotona
- Species: T. submaculata

Binomial name
- Teracotona submaculata (Walker, 1855)

Synonyms
- Spilosoma submacula Walker, 1855; Teracotona roseata Butler, 1878

Species of moth

Teracotona submaculata is a moth in the family Erebidae. It was described by Francis Walker in 1855. It is found in Kenya, Malawi, Namibia, Somalia and South Africa.
