= Phiala abyssinica =

Scientific classification
- Kingdom: Animalia
- Phylum: Arthropoda
- Clade: Pancrustacea
- Class: Insecta
- Order: Lepidoptera
- Family: Eupterotidae
- Genus: Phiala
- Species: P. abyssinica

Binomial name
- Phiala abyssinica Aurivillius, 1904

Species of moth

Phiala abyssinica is a moth in the family Eupterotidae. It was described by Per Olof Christopher Aurivillius in 1904. It is found in Ethiopia.

The wingspan is 48 mm. The wings are greyish white, densely irrorated (sprinkled) with large black scales, except at costa of the forewings and at the base of the hindwings. The veins are also nearly destitute of black scales and the black scales on the forewings condensed to a broad curved stripe from near the apex to the middle of the hindmargin. The black spots on the veins of the hindwings are more or less indicated.
