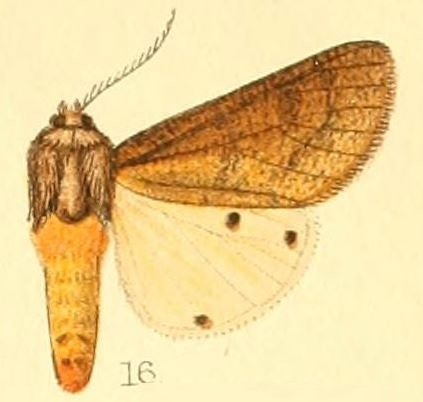
- Teracotona subterminata

Scientific classification
- Domain: Eukaryota
- Kingdom: Animalia
- Phylum: Arthropoda
- Class: Insecta
- Order: Lepidoptera
- Superfamily: Noctuoidea
- Family: Erebidae
- Subfamily: Arctiinae
- Subtribe: Spilosomina
- Genus: Teracotona; Butler, 1878

Type species
- Aloa rhodophaea Walker, [1865] 1864

Synonyms
- Macronyx Felder, 1874

= Teracotona =

Genus of moths

Teracotona is a genus of moths in the family Erebidae from the Afrotropics. The genus was erected by Arthur Gardiner Butler in 1878.

== Species ==
=== Subgenus Teracotona Butler, 1878 ===
- Teracotona euprepia Hampson, 1900
  - Teracotona euprepia bicolor Toulgoët, 1980
- Teracotona euprepioides Wichgraf, 1921
- Teracotona pardalina Bartel, 1903
- Teracotona quadripunctata Wichgraf, 1908 (=buryi Rothschild, 1910)
- Teracotona rhodophaea (Walker, [1865])
- Teracotona submaculata (Walker, 1855)
- Teracotona trifasciata Bartel, 1903

=== Subgenus Neoteracotona Dubatolov, 2009 ===
- Teracotona alicia (Hampson, 1911)
- Teracotona jacksoni (Rothschild, 1910)
- Teracotona kovtunovitchi Dubatolov, 2011
- Teracotona murtafaa Wiltshire, 1980
- Teracotona pallida Joicey & Talbot, 1924
- Teracotona pitmanni (Rothschild, 1933)
  - Teracotona pitmani major (Rothschild, 1933)
- Teracotona postalbida Gaede, 1926
- Teracotona proditrix Berio, 1939
- Teracotona pruinosa de Joannis, 1912
- Teracotona translucens (Grünberg, 1907)

=== Subgenus Pseudoteracotona Dubatolov, 2009 ===
- Teracotona abyssinica (Rothschild, 1933)
- Teracotona approximans (Rothschild, 1917)
- Teracotona clara Holland, 1892
  - Teracotona clara rubiginea(Toulgoët, 1977)
- Teracotona immaculata (Wichgraf, 1921)
- Teracotona melanocera (Hampson, 1920)
- Teracotona metaxantha (Hampson, 1920)
- Teracotona multistrigata Joicey & Talbot, 1924
- Teracotona neumanni (Rothschild, 1933)
- Teracotona seminigra (Hampson, 1905)
- Teracotona senegalensis (Rothschild, 1933)
- Teracotona subapproximans (Rothschild, 1933)
- Teracotona subterminata (Hampson, 1901)
- Teracotona uhrikmeszarosi Szent-Ivany, 1942
- Teracotona wittei (Debauche, 1942)

=== Teracotona sensu lato ===
- Teracotona homeyeri Rothschild, 1910
- Teracotona latifasciata Carcasson, 1965

== Incorrectly placed species ==
- Teracotona mirabilis - transferred into Lithosiinae
