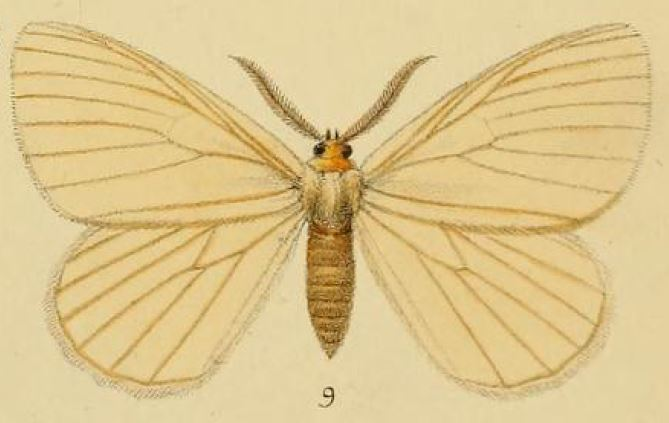
- Phiala odites

Scientific classification
- Kingdom: Animalia
- Phylum: Arthropoda
- Class: Insecta
- Order: Lepidoptera
- Family: Eupterotidae
- Subfamily: Eupterotinae
- Genus: Phiala; Wallengren, 1860

Synonyms
- Euchera Hübner, 1825; Heteromorpha Herrich-Schäffer, 1855; Olistheria Hübner, 1820; Phialla Wichgraf, 1908; Stibolepis Butler, 1878

= Phiala =

Genus of moths

Phiala is a genus of moths in the family Eupterotidae.

== Selected species ==
Some species of this genus are:

- Phiala abyssinica Aurivillius, 1904
- Phiala alba (Aurivillius, 1893)
- Phiala albida (Plötz, 1880)
- Phiala albidorsata Gaede, 1927
- Phiala aurivillii (Bethune-Baker, 1915)
- Phiala bamenda Strand, 1911
- Phiala bergeri Rougeot, 1975
- Phiala bistrigata Aurivillius, 1901
- Phiala costipuncta (Herrich-Schäffer, 1855)
- Phiala crassistriga Strand, 1911
- Phiala cubicularis Strand, 1911
- Phiala cunina Cramer, 1780
- Phiala dasypoda Wallengren, 1860
- Phiala esomelana (Bethune-Baker, 1927)
- Phiala flavina Gaede, 1927
- Phiala flavipennis Wallengren, 1875
- Phiala fuscodorsata Aurivillius, 1904
- Phiala hologramma (Aurivillius, 1904)
- Phiala incana Distant, 1897
- Phiala infuscata (Grünberg, 1907)
- Phiala longilinea Berio, 1939
- Phiala marshalli Aurivillius, 1904
- Phiala maxima Kühne, 2007
- Phiala nigrolineata Aurivillius, 1903
- Phiala niveociliata Strand, 1911
- Phiala novemlineata Aurivillius, 1911
- Phiala ochriventris Strand, 1911
- Phiala odites Schaus, 1893
- Phiala parabiota Kühne, 2007
- Phiala polita Distant, 1897
- Phiala postmedialis Strand, 1911
- Phiala pretoriana Wichgraf, 1908
- Phiala pseudatomaria Strand, 1911
- Phiala pulverea Distant, 1903
- Phiala punctulata Pagenstecher, 1903
- Phiala sabalina Rebel, 1914
- Phiala similis Aurivillius, 1911
- Phiala simplex Aurivillius, 1904
- Phiala specialis Kühne, 2007.
- Phiala subiridescens (Holland, 1893)
- Phiala subochracea Strand, 1911
- Phiala tanganyikae Strand, 1911
- Phiala ueleae Kühne, 2007
- Phiala uelleburgensis Strand, 1912
- Phiala unistriga Gaede, 1927
- Phiala venusta (Walker, 1865)
- Phiala wichgrafi Strand, 1911
