= Phiala maxima =

Scientific classification
- Kingdom: Animalia
- Phylum: Arthropoda
- Clade: Pancrustacea
- Class: Insecta
- Order: Lepidoptera
- Family: Eupterotidae
- Genus: Phiala
- Species: P. maxima

Binomial name
- Phiala maxima Kühne, 2007

Species of moth

Phiala maxima is a moth in the family Eupterotidae. It was described by Lars Kühne in 2007. It is found in the Democratic Republic of the Congo.
