= Phiala dasypoda =

Scientific classification
- Kingdom: Animalia
- Phylum: Arthropoda
- Clade: Pancrustacea
- Class: Insecta
- Order: Lepidoptera
- Family: Eupterotidae
- Genus: Phiala
- Species: P. dasypoda

Binomial name
- Phiala dasypoda Wallengren, 1860

Species of moth

Phiala dasypoda is a moth in the family Eupterotidae. It was described by Wallengren in 1860. It is found in South Africa.
