= Teracotona clara =

Scientific classification
- Domain: Eukaryota
- Kingdom: Animalia
- Phylum: Arthropoda
- Class: Insecta
- Order: Lepidoptera
- Superfamily: Noctuoidea
- Family: Erebidae
- Subfamily: Arctiinae
- Genus: Teracotona
- Species: T. clara

Binomial name
- Teracotona clara Holland, 1892

Synonyms
- Seirarctia clara ab. indistincta Strand, 1921; Seirarctia clara ab. obscurascens Strand, 1921; Seirarctia clara rubiginea Toulgoët, 1977

Species of moth

Teracotona clara is a moth in the family Erebidae. It was described by William Jacob Holland in 1892. It is found in Burundi, Ethiopia, Kenya, Rwanda, Tanzania and Uganda.

== Subspecies ==
- Teracotona clara clara (Kenya and Tanzania)
- Teracotona clara rubiginea (Toulgoët, 1977) (Ethiopia)
