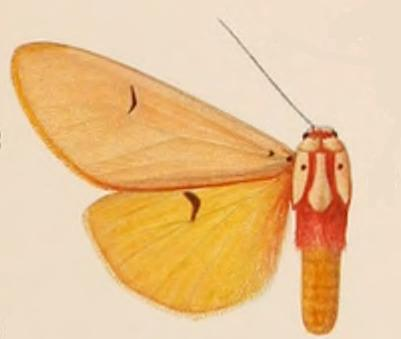

Scientific classification
- Kingdom: Animalia
- Phylum: Arthropoda
- Class: Insecta
- Order: Lepidoptera
- Superfamily: Noctuoidea
- Family: Erebidae
- Subfamily: Arctiinae
- Genus: Teracotona
- Species: T. homeyeri

Binomial name
- Teracotona homeyeri Rothschild, 1910

= Teracotona homeyeri =

Species of moth

Teracotona homeyeri is a moth of the family Erebidae. It is found in Angola, the Democratic Republic of Congo, Malawi and Tanzania.
