= Phiala pseudatomaria =

Scientific classification
- Kingdom: Animalia
- Phylum: Arthropoda
- Clade: Pancrustacea
- Class: Insecta
- Order: Lepidoptera
- Family: Eupterotidae
- Genus: Phiala
- Species: P. pseudatomaria

Binomial name
- Phiala pseudatomaria Strand, 1911

Synonyms
- Phiala sigyna Aurivillius, 1893; Phiala sublimbalis Strand, 1911

Species of moth

Phiala pseudatomaria is a moth in the family Eupterotidae. It was described by Strand in 1911. It is found in Cameroon, the Central African Republic, the Democratic Republic of Congo (Orientale), Mozambique, South Africa, Tanzania and Zimbabwe.
