= Digama costimacula =

Scientific classification
- Kingdom: Animalia
- Phylum: Arthropoda
- Class: Insecta
- Order: Lepidoptera
- Superfamily: Noctuoidea
- Family: Erebidae
- Genus: Digama
- Species: D. costimacula

Binomial name
- Digama costimacula C. Swinhoe, 1907

Synonyms
- Sommeria costimacula Swinhoe, 1907

Species of moth

Digama costimacula is a moth of the family Erebidae first described by Charles Swinhoe in 1907. It is found in Ghana, Kenya and Nigeria.
