= Teracotona trifasciata =

Scientific classification
- Kingdom: Animalia
- Phylum: Arthropoda
- Clade: Pancrustacea
- Class: Insecta
- Order: Lepidoptera
- Superfamily: Noctuoidea
- Family: Erebidae
- Subfamily: Arctiinae
- Genus: Teracotona
- Species: T. trifasciata

Binomial name
- Teracotona trifasciata Bartel, 1903

Species of moth

Teracotona trifasciata is a moth in the family Erebidae. It was described by Max Bartel in 1903. It is found in Angola and Malawi.
