= Phiala venusta =

Scientific classification
- Kingdom: Animalia
- Phylum: Arthropoda
- Clade: Pancrustacea
- Class: Insecta
- Order: Lepidoptera
- Family: Eupterotidae
- Genus: Phiala
- Species: P. venusta

Binomial name
- Phiala venusta (Walker, 1865)

Synonyms
- Dasychira venusta Walker, 1865; Phiala angulata Gaede, 1927

Species of moth

Phiala venusta is a moth in the family Eupterotidae. It was described by Francis Walker in 1865. It is found in Sierra Leone.

The wings are silvery white, with an exterior oblique line of black points. These are sometimes connected and the line is always entire towards the interior border of the forewings.
