= Phiala novemlineata =

Scientific classification
- Kingdom: Animalia
- Phylum: Arthropoda
- Clade: Pancrustacea
- Class: Insecta
- Order: Lepidoptera
- Family: Eupterotidae
- Genus: Phiala
- Species: P. novemlineata

Binomial name
- Phiala novemlineata (Aurivillius, 1911)

Synonyms
- Stibolepis novemlineata Aurivillius, 1911

Species of moth

Phiala novemlineata is a moth in the family Eupterotidae. It was described by Per Olof Christopher Aurivillius in 1911. It is found in Uganda.

The wingspan is 53 mm. Adults are very pale ochreous yellow or yellowish white, the forewings with four erect slightly waved black transverse lines at the base, and with five such lines in the apical half, of which the first touches the hind angle of the cell, and the last is larger, slightly oblique and reaches the costa just before the apex. The hindwings have a gently curved subterminal black line, which also is slightly indicated in the forewings.
