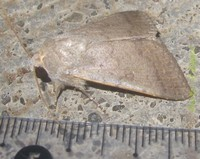
- Pandesma muricolor

Scientific classification
- Domain: Eukaryota
- Kingdom: Animalia
- Phylum: Arthropoda
- Class: Insecta
- Order: Lepidoptera
- Superfamily: Noctuoidea
- Family: Erebidae
- Subfamily: Erebinae
- Tribe: Pandesmini
- Genus: Pandesma; Guenée in Boisduval & Guenée, 1852

Synonyms
- Cerbia Walker, [1858]; Thria Walker, [1858]; Michera Walker, 1865; Vapara Moore, 1882; Subpandesma Berio, 1966

= Pandesma =

Genus of moths

Pandesma is a genus of moths in the family Erebidae. The genus was erected by Achille Guenée in 1852.

== Species ==
- Pandesma anysa Guenée, 1852
- Pandesma decaryi (Viette, 1966)
- Pandesma fugitiva Walker, 1858
- Pandesma muricolor Berio, 1966
- Pandesma partita Walker, 1858
- Pandesma quenavadi Guenée, 1852
- Pandesma robusta Walker, [1858]
- Pandesma submurina Walker, 1865
