= Teracotona seminigra =

Scientific classification
- Kingdom: Animalia
- Phylum: Arthropoda
- Class: Insecta
- Order: Lepidoptera
- Superfamily: Noctuoidea
- Family: Erebidae
- Subfamily: Arctiinae
- Genus: Teracotona
- Species: T. seminigra

Binomial name
- Teracotona seminigra (Hampson, 1905)

Synonyms
- Amsacta seminigra Hampson, 1905

Species of moth

Teracotona seminigra is a moth in the family Erebidae. It was described by George Hampson in 1905. It is found in Ethiopia.
