= Digama septempuncta =

Scientific classification
- Kingdom: Animalia
- Phylum: Arthropoda
- Class: Insecta
- Order: Lepidoptera
- Superfamily: Noctuoidea
- Family: Erebidae
- Genus: Digama
- Species: D. septempuncta

Binomial name
- Digama septempuncta Hampson, 1910

Species of moth

Digama septempuncta is a moth of the family Erebidae. It is found on Rodrigues.
