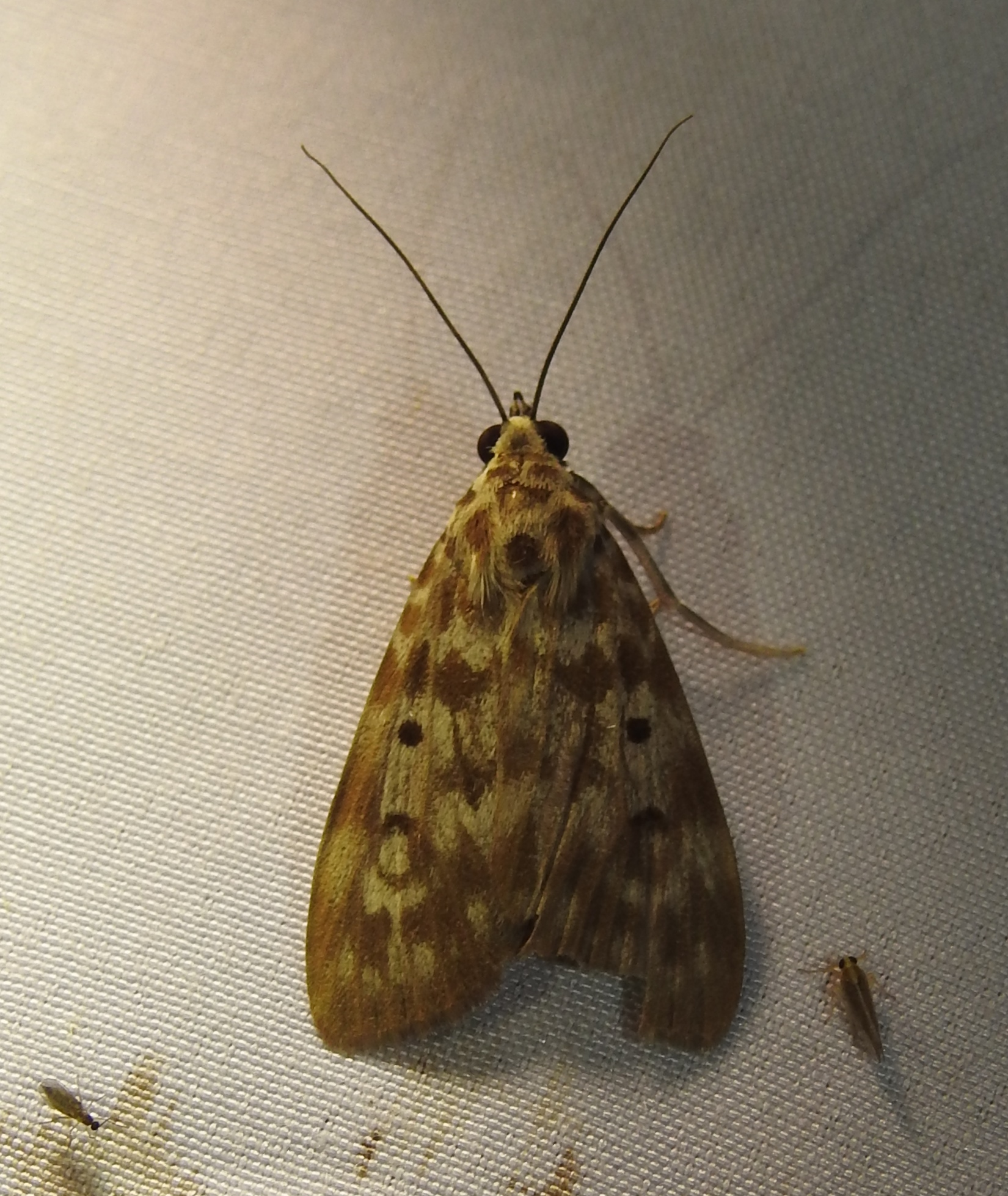

Scientific classification
- Kingdom: Animalia
- Phylum: Arthropoda
- Clade: Pancrustacea
- Class: Insecta
- Order: Lepidoptera
- Superfamily: Noctuoidea
- Family: Erebidae
- Genus: Digama
- Species: D. marchalii

Binomial name
- Digama marchalii (Guerin, 1843)

Synonyms
- Callimorpha marchalii Guerin, 1843

= Digama marchalii =

Species of moth

Digama marchalii is a moth species of the family Erebidae. It is found in southern India and Myanmar.

== Subspecies ==
- Digama marchalii figurata (Myanmar)
- Digama marchalii intermedia (southern India)
- Digama marchalii marchalii (southern India)
- Digama marchalii nebulosa (southern India)
