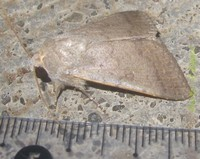

Scientific classification
- Kingdom: Animalia
- Phylum: Arthropoda
- Clade: Pancrustacea
- Class: Insecta
- Order: Lepidoptera
- Superfamily: Noctuoidea
- Family: Erebidae
- Genus: Pandesma
- Species: P. muricolor

Binomial name
- Pandesma muricolor Berio, 1966

= Pandesma muricolor =

Species of moth

Pandesma muricolor is a moth of the family Erebidae. It is native to western, central & south-eastern Africa.

One known foodplant of this moth is a Fabaceae (Acacia sp.)
