= Phiala sabalina =

Scientific classification
- Kingdom: Animalia
- Phylum: Arthropoda
- Clade: Pancrustacea
- Class: Insecta
- Order: Lepidoptera
- Family: Eupterotidae
- Genus: Phiala
- Species: P. sabalina

Binomial name
- Phiala sabalina Rebel, 1914

Species of moth

Phiala sabalina is a moth in the family Eupterotidae. It was described by Hans Rebel in 1914. It is found in the Democratic Republic of Congo (South Kivu).
