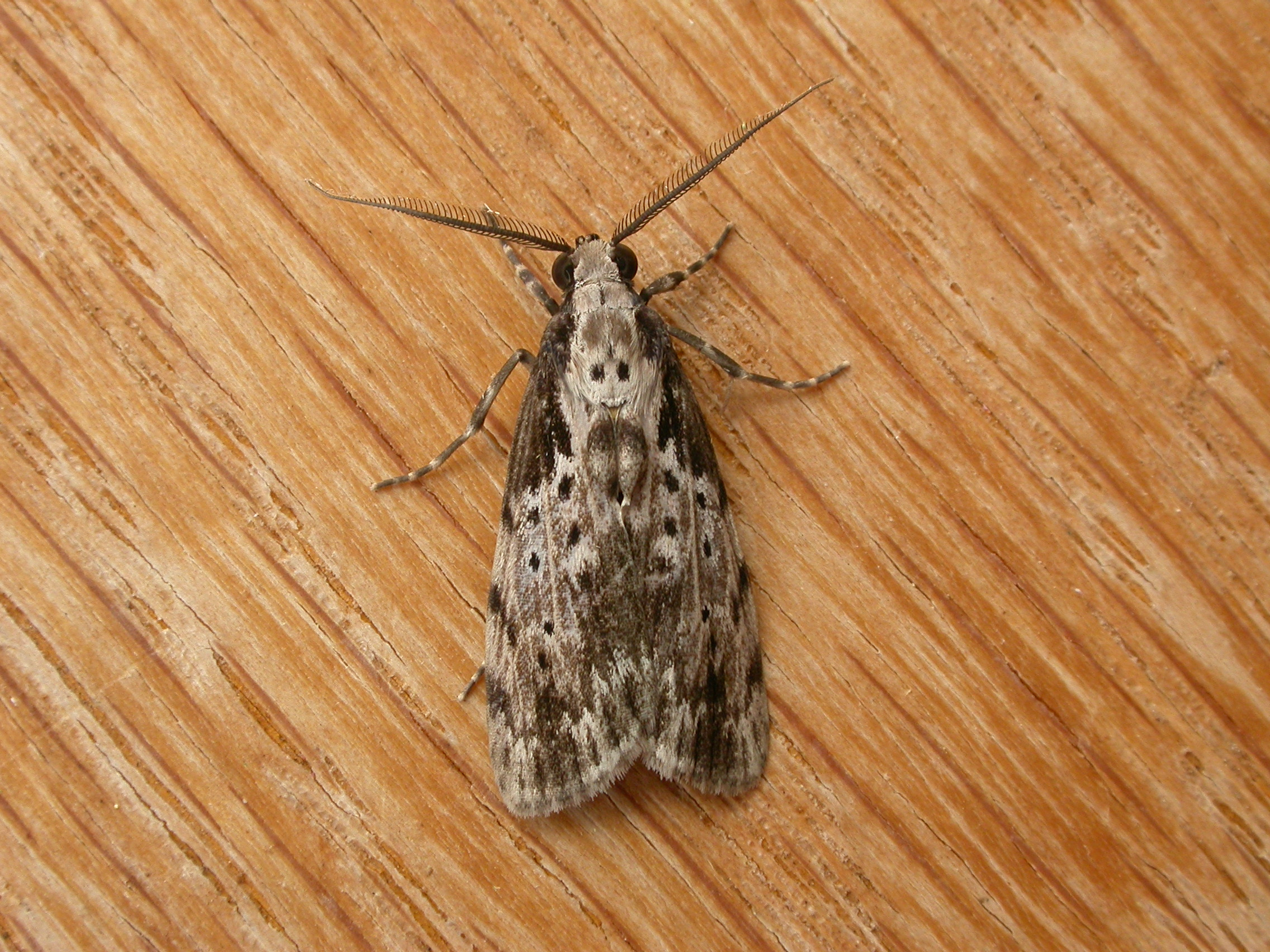

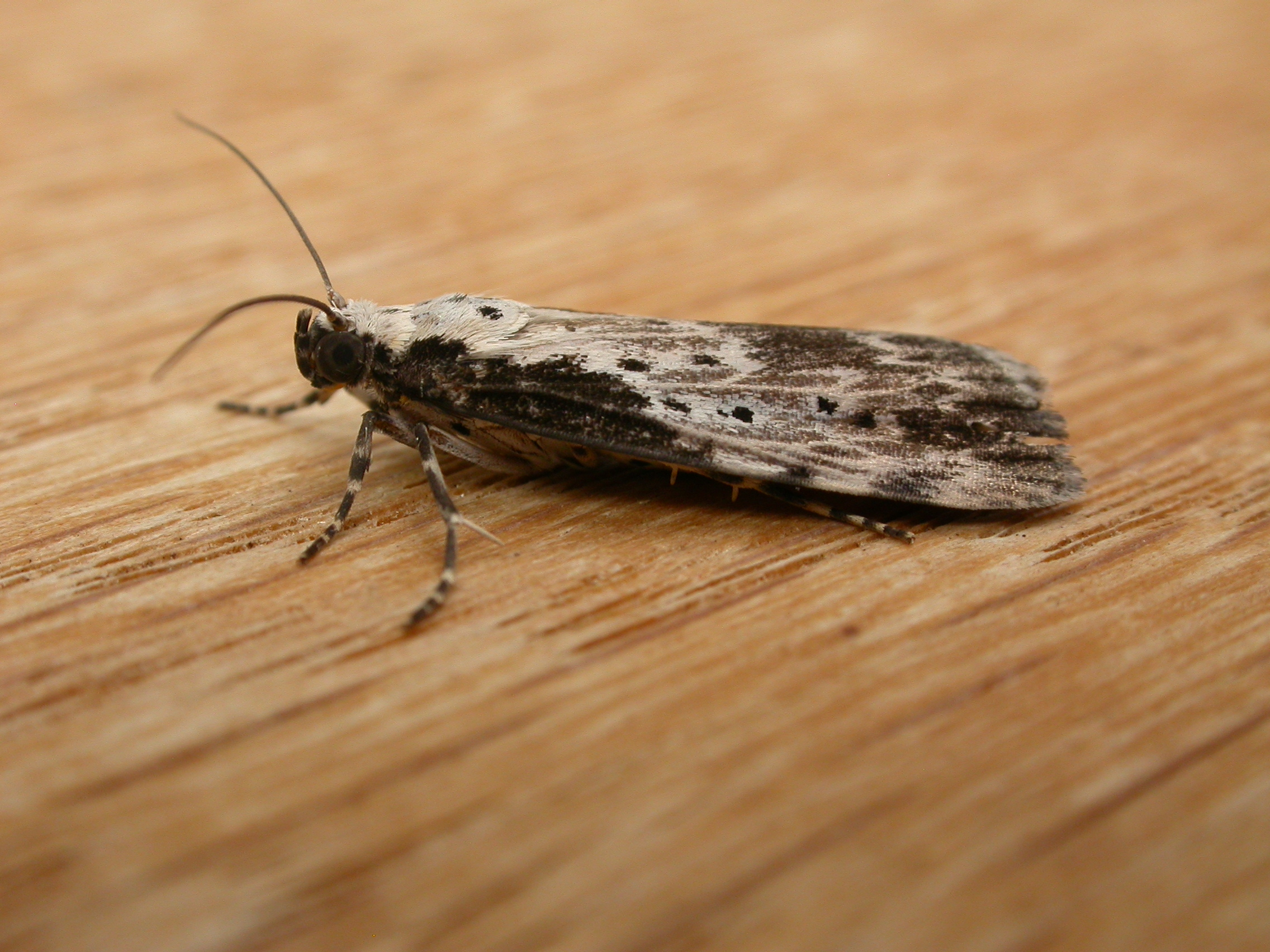

Scientific classification
- Domain: Eukaryota
- Kingdom: Animalia
- Phylum: Arthropoda
- Class: Insecta
- Order: Lepidoptera
- Superfamily: Noctuoidea
- Family: Erebidae
- Genus: Digama
- Species: D. marmorea

Binomial name
- Digama marmorea Butler, 1877

Synonyms
- Digama piepersiana Snellen, 1879; Digama clinchorum Holloway, 1979

= Digama marmorea =

Species of moth

Digama marmorea is a moth of the family Erebidae. It is found in New Caledonia, Sulawesi, Sundaland and northern Australia, where it is found from Coen in Queensland to Jervis Bay in New South Wales.

The wingspan is 27–29 mm.

The larvae feed on Carissa ovata.

== Subspecies ==
- Digama marmorea clinchorum (New Caledonia)
- Digama marmorea marmorea (Sulawesi, Sunda, northern Australia)

== Gallery ==
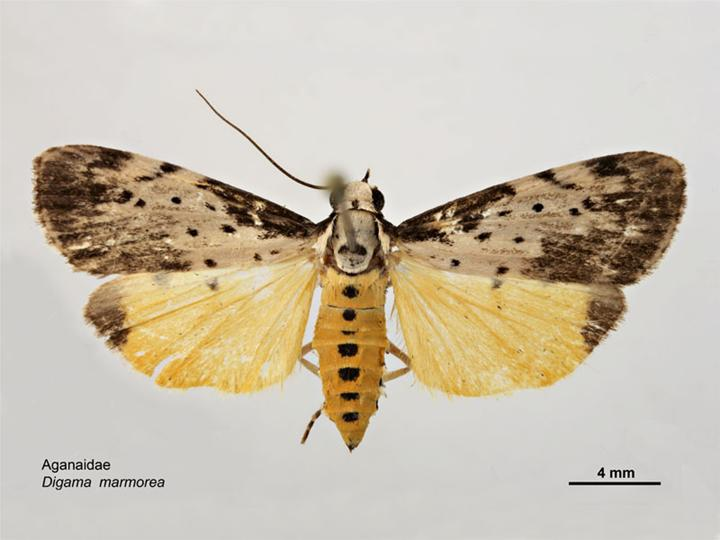
Dorsal view

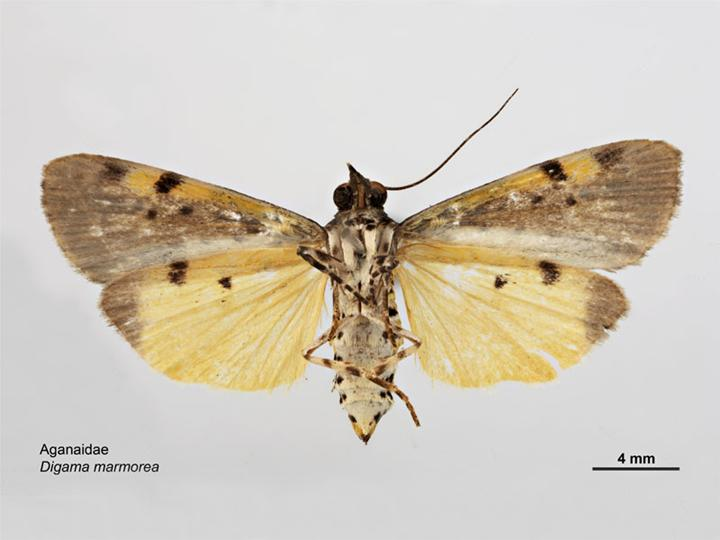
Ventral view
