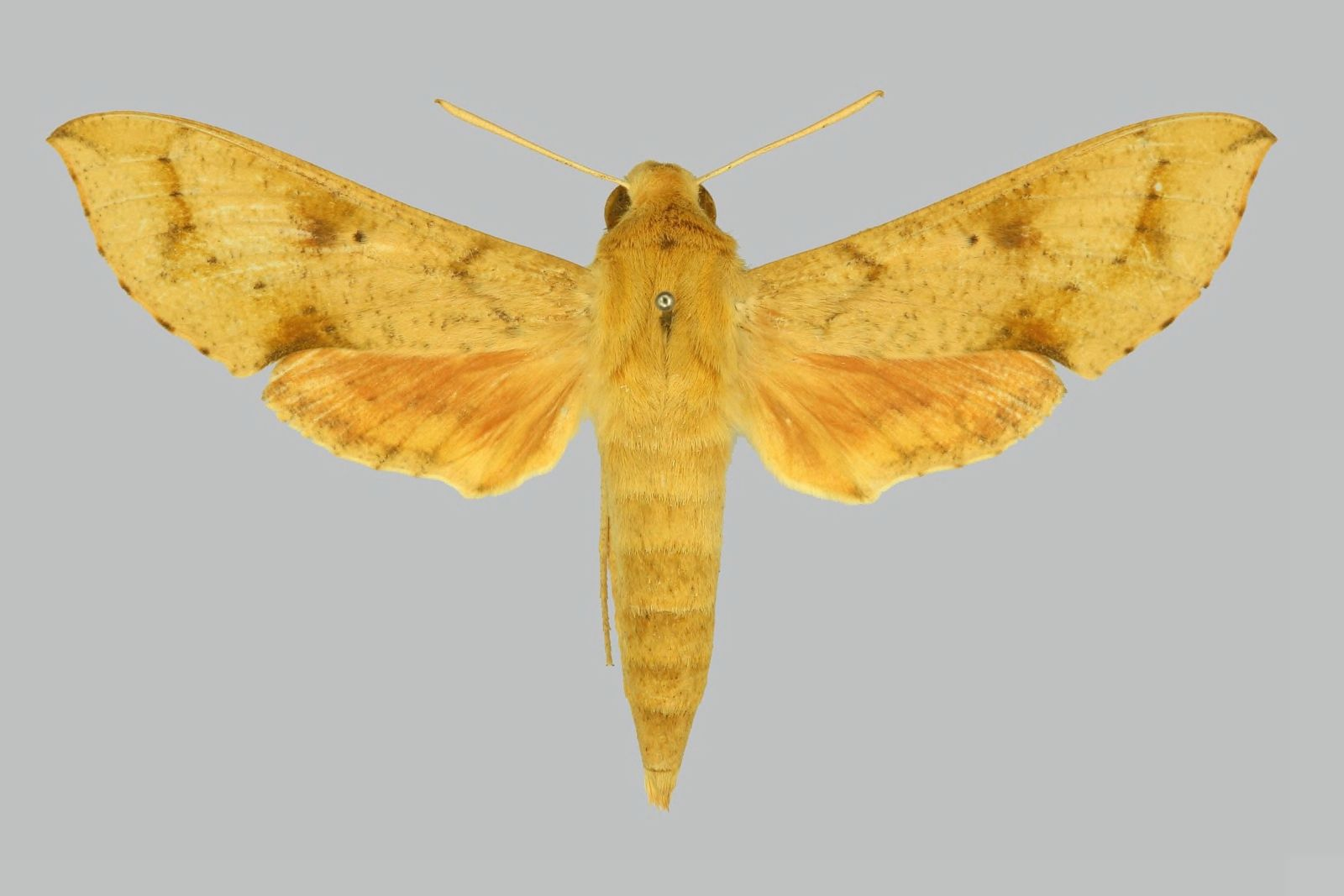
- Female Hippotion rebeli

Scientific classification
- Kingdom: Animalia
- Phylum: Arthropoda
- Class: Insecta
- Order: Lepidoptera
- Family: Sphingidae
- Genus: Hippotion
- Species: H. rebeli

Binomial name
- Hippotion rebeli Rothschild & Jordan, 1903

Synonyms
- Hippotion rebeli undulata Berio, 1948; Hippotion rebeli suffusa Berio, 1948; Hippotion rebeli stricta Berio, 1948; Hippotion rebeli placata Berio, 1948; Hippotion rebeli pallidissima Berio, 1948; Hippotion rebeli invertita Berio, 1948; Hippotion rebeli fusa Berio, 1948

= Hippotion rebeli =

Species of moth

Hippotion rebeli is a species of moth in the family Sphingidae. It is known from dry areas in northern Uganda, Kenya, Tanzania, Sudan, Ethiopia, Somalia and Arabia.

The length of the forewings is 25–28 mm. It is very similar to Hippotion roseipennis and equally variable, but larger and generally more reddish on both sides and more heavily marked.
