= Phiala specialis =

Scientific classification
- Kingdom: Animalia
- Phylum: Arthropoda
- Clade: Pancrustacea
- Class: Insecta
- Order: Lepidoptera
- Family: Eupterotidae
- Genus: Phiala
- Species: P. specialis

Binomial name
- Phiala specialis Kühne, 2007

Species of moth

Phiala specialis is a moth in the family Eupterotidae. It was described by Lars Kühne in 2007. It is found in Cameroon and the Democratic Republic of the Congo.
