= Teracotona neumanni =

Scientific classification
- Kingdom: Animalia
- Phylum: Arthropoda
- Class: Insecta
- Order: Lepidoptera
- Superfamily: Noctuoidea
- Family: Erebidae
- Subfamily: Arctiinae
- Genus: Teracotona
- Species: T. neumanni

Binomial name
- Teracotona neumanni Rothschild, 1933

Species of moth

Teracotona neumanni is a moth in the family Erebidae. It was described by Rothschild in 1933. It is found in Ethiopia.
