= Digama sagittata =

Scientific classification
- Domain: Eukaryota
- Kingdom: Animalia
- Phylum: Arthropoda
- Class: Insecta
- Order: Lepidoptera
- Superfamily: Noctuoidea
- Family: Erebidae
- Genus: Digama
- Species: D. sagittata

Binomial name
- Digama sagittata Gaede, 1926

Species of moth

Digama sagittata is a moth of the family Erebidae. It is found in Madagascar and on the Comores.

== Subspecies ==
- Digama sagittata sagittata (Madagascar)
- Digama sagittata angasijensis (Comores)
- Digama sagittata duberneti (Comores)
- Digama sagittata toulgoeti (Comores)
