= Teracotona subapproximans =

Scientific classification
- Kingdom: Animalia
- Phylum: Arthropoda
- Class: Insecta
- Order: Lepidoptera
- Superfamily: Noctuoidea
- Family: Erebidae
- Subfamily: Arctiinae
- Genus: Teracotona
- Species: T. subapproximans

Binomial name
- Teracotona subapproximans Rothschild, 1933

Species of moth

Teracotona subapproximans is a moth in the family Erebidae. It was described by Rothschild in 1933. It is found in Tanzania.
