= Phiala bistrigata =

Scientific classification
- Kingdom: Animalia
- Phylum: Arthropoda
- Clade: Pancrustacea
- Class: Insecta
- Order: Lepidoptera
- Family: Eupterotidae
- Genus: Phiala
- Species: P. bistrigata

Binomial name
- Phiala bistrigata Aurivillius, 1901

Synonyms
- Phiala curvistriga Strand, 1911

Species of moth

Phiala bistrigata is a moth in the family Eupterotidae. It was described by Per Olof Christopher Aurivillius in 1901. It is found in South Africa and Tanzania.
