= Phiala ochriventris =

Scientific classification
- Kingdom: Animalia
- Phylum: Arthropoda
- Clade: Pancrustacea
- Class: Insecta
- Order: Lepidoptera
- Family: Eupterotidae
- Genus: Phiala
- Species: P. ochriventris

Binomial name
- Phiala ochriventris Strand, 1911

Species of moth

Phiala ochriventris is a moth in the family Eupterotidae. It was described by Strand in 1911. It is found in Cameroon.
