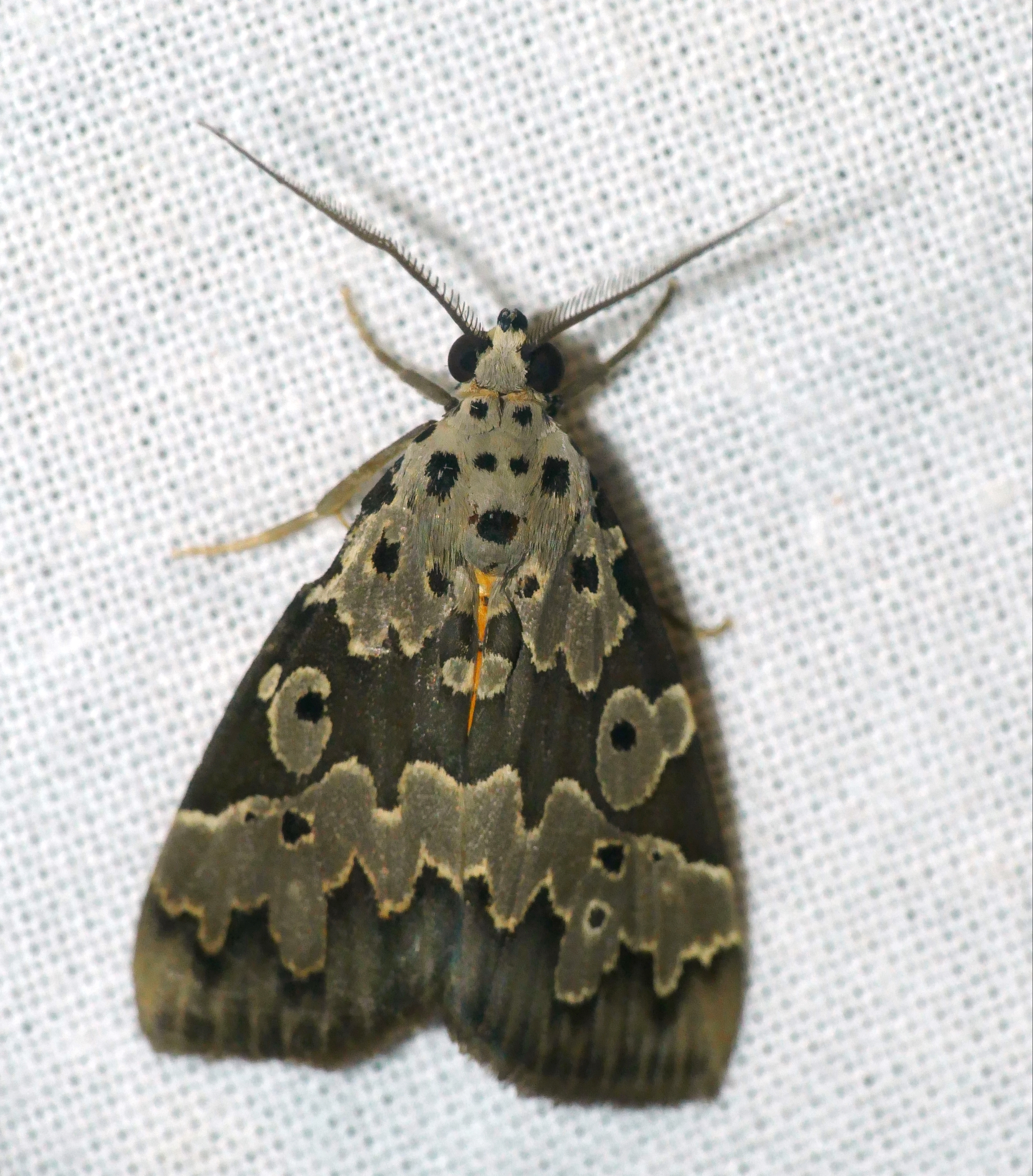

Scientific classification
- Kingdom: Animalia
- Phylum: Arthropoda
- Clade: Pancrustacea
- Class: Insecta
- Order: Lepidoptera
- Superfamily: Noctuoidea
- Family: Erebidae
- Genus: Digama
- Species: D. culta

Binomial name
- Digama culta (Hübner, [1825])

Synonyms
- Sommeria culta Hübner, 1827; Digama marmorata Walker, 1865

= Digama culta =

Species of moth

Digama culta is a moth of the family Erebidae. It is found in South Africa.
