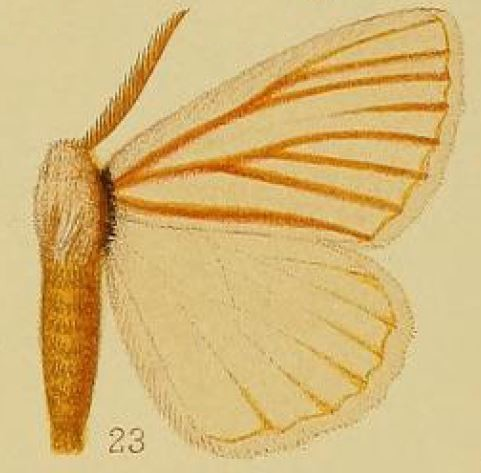
- Phiala nigrolineata

Scientific classification
- Kingdom: Animalia
- Phylum: Arthropoda
- Clade: Pancrustacea
- Class: Insecta
- Order: Lepidoptera
- Family: Eupterotidae
- Genus: Phiala
- Species: P. nigrolineata

Binomial name
- Phiala nigrolineata Aurivillius, 1903

Synonyms
- Phiala chrysargyra Wichgraf, 1914; Phiala nigrovenata Bethune-Baker, 1911; Phiala ochrescens Gaede, 1927; Phiala rubrivena Hampson, 1910

= Phiala nigrolineata =

Species of moth

Phiala nigrolineata is a moth in the family Eupterotidae. It was described by Per Olof Christopher Aurivillius in 1903. It is found in the Democratic Republic of the Congo, South Africa, Togo, Uganda and Zambia.

The wingspan is 62 mm. The wings are pale cream colour, with all the veins outlined strongly with black, but on the hindwings, the black lines are much finer and do not extend backwards into the median area. The fringes in both wings are yellowish.
