= Phiala uelleburgensis =

Scientific classification
- Kingdom: Animalia
- Phylum: Arthropoda
- Clade: Pancrustacea
- Class: Insecta
- Order: Lepidoptera
- Family: Eupterotidae
- Genus: Phiala
- Species: P. uelleburgensis

Binomial name
- Phiala uelleburgensis Strand, 1912

Species of moth

Phiala uelleburgensis is a moth in the family Eupterotidae. It was described by Strand in 1912. It is found in Equatorial Guinea.
