= Digama sinuosa =

Scientific classification
- Kingdom: Animalia
- Phylum: Arthropoda
- Class: Insecta
- Order: Lepidoptera
- Superfamily: Noctuoidea
- Family: Erebidae
- Genus: Digama
- Species: D. sinuosa

Binomial name
- Digama sinuosa Hampson, 1905

Species of moth

Digama sinuosa is a moth of the family Erebidae. It is found in Africa, including South Africa.
