= Teracotona postalbida =

Scientific classification
- Kingdom: Animalia
- Phylum: Arthropoda
- Class: Insecta
- Order: Lepidoptera
- Superfamily: Noctuoidea
- Family: Erebidae
- Subfamily: Arctiinae
- Genus: Teracotona
- Species: T. postalbida

Binomial name
- Teracotona postalbida (Gaede, 1926)

Synonyms
- Seirarctia postalbida Gaede, 1926

Species of moth

Teracotona postalbida is a moth in the family Erebidae. It was described by Max Gaede in 1926. It is found in Ethiopia.
