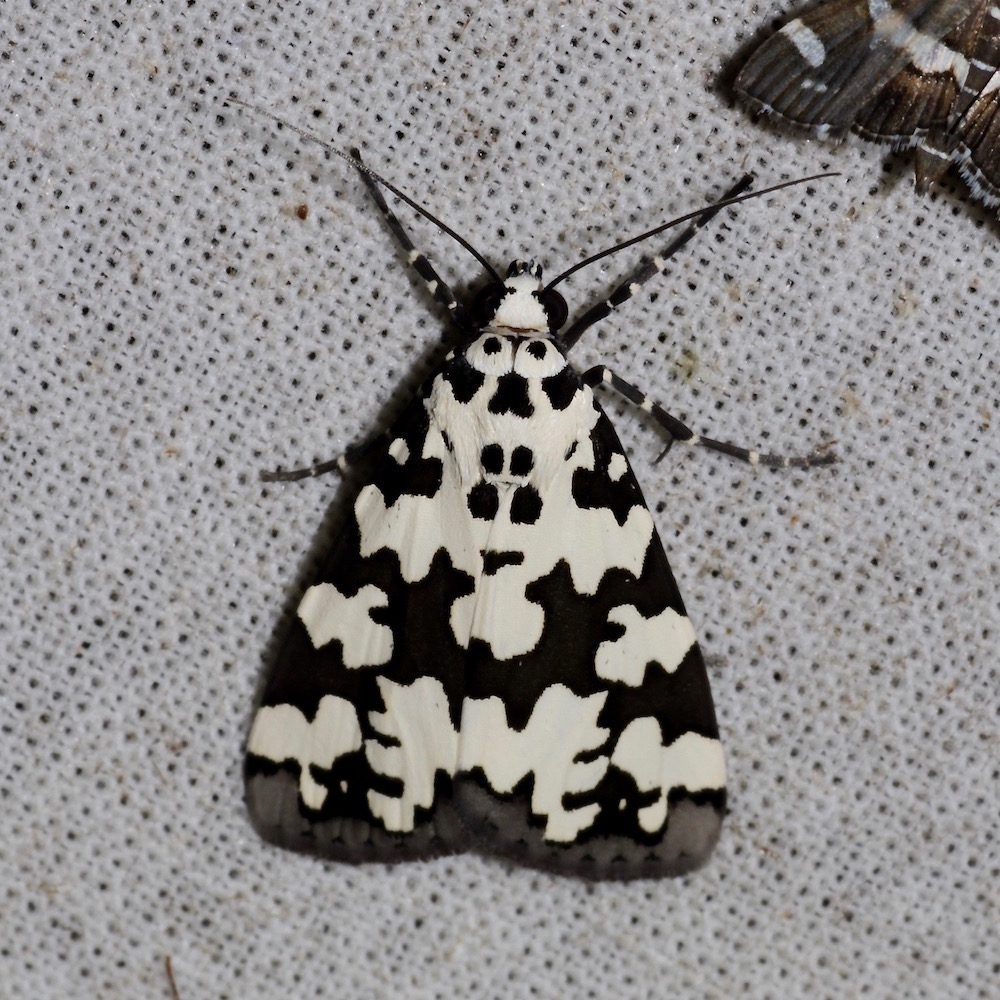

Scientific classification
- Domain: Eukaryota
- Kingdom: Animalia
- Phylum: Arthropoda
- Class: Insecta
- Order: Lepidoptera
- Superfamily: Noctuoidea
- Family: Erebidae
- Genus: Digama
- Species: D. spilosoma

Binomial name
- Digama spilosoma (Felder, 1874)

Synonyms
- Sommeria spilosoma Felder, 1874; Homoeognatha spilosoma Felder, 1874

= Digama spilosoma =

Species of moth

Digama spilosoma is a moth of the family Erebidae. Formerly the genus Digama was placed in the family Erebidae, subfamily Aganainae or Agaristinae. It is found in Africa, including South Africa.
