= Teracotona euprepioides =

Scientific classification
- Domain: Eukaryota
- Kingdom: Animalia
- Phylum: Arthropoda
- Class: Insecta
- Order: Lepidoptera
- Superfamily: Noctuoidea
- Family: Erebidae
- Subfamily: Arctiinae
- Genus: Teracotona
- Species: T. euprepioides

Binomial name
- Teracotona euprepioides Wichgraf, 1921

Species of moth

Teracotona euprepioides is a moth in the family Erebidae. It was described by Wichgraf in 1921. It is found in Angola.
