= Phiala similis =

Scientific classification
- Kingdom: Animalia
- Phylum: Arthropoda
- Clade: Pancrustacea
- Class: Insecta
- Order: Lepidoptera
- Family: Eupterotidae
- Genus: Phiala
- Species: P. similis

Binomial name
- Phiala similis Aurivillius, 1911

Species of moth

Phiala similis is a moth in the family Eupterotidae. It was described by Per Olof Christopher Aurivillius in 1911. It is found in South Africa.

The wingspan is 47 mm. Adults are white, the wings beyond the middle with a common series of more or less connected black spots on the veins, but otherwise nearly destitute of black scales.
