= Digama fasciata =

Scientific classification
- Domain: Eukaryota
- Kingdom: Animalia
- Phylum: Arthropoda
- Class: Insecta
- Order: Lepidoptera
- Superfamily: Noctuoidea
- Family: Erebidae
- Genus: Digama
- Species: D. fasciata

Binomial name
- Digama fasciata Butler, 1877

Species of moth

Digama fasciata is a moth of the family Erebidae described by Arthur Gardiner Butler in 1877. It is found in north-western India and Sri Lanka.

== Description ==
Antennae of male bipectinate (comb like on both sides) where the terminal one-fifth ciliated. Forewing with a fold on inner margin on upperside. In female, head and thorax brownish fuscous and abdomen orange yellow, with that the patagia have each a black streak. Forewing greyish fuscous. There are three black strigae on the costa, and two spots in the cell. Discocellulars are black. Three spots found in interno-median interspace. There is a large sub-basal spot above inner margin and two small spots beyond it. A spot beyond lower angle of cell and a curved irregular sub-marginal band present. Hindwings are orange yellow.
