= Teracotona multistrigata =

Scientific classification
- Domain: Eukaryota
- Kingdom: Animalia
- Phylum: Arthropoda
- Class: Insecta
- Order: Lepidoptera
- Superfamily: Noctuoidea
- Family: Erebidae
- Subfamily: Arctiinae
- Genus: Teracotona
- Species: T. multistrigata

Binomial name
- Teracotona multistrigata Joicey & Talbot, 1924

Species of moth

Teracotona multistrigata is a moth in the family Erebidae. It was described by James John Joicey and George Talbot in 1924. It is found in the Democratic Republic of the Congo and Rwanda.
