= Teracotona abyssinica =

Scientific classification
- Domain: Eukaryota
- Kingdom: Animalia
- Phylum: Arthropoda
- Class: Insecta
- Order: Lepidoptera
- Superfamily: Noctuoidea
- Family: Erebidae
- Subfamily: Arctiinae
- Genus: Teracotona
- Species: T. abyssinica

Binomial name
- Teracotona abyssinica (Rothschild, 1933)

Synonyms
- Seirarctia abyssinica Rothschild, 1933

Species of moth

Teracotona abyssinica is a moth in the family Erebidae. It was described by Walter Rothschild in 1933. It is found in Ethiopia and Kenya.
