= Teracotona latifasciata =

Scientific classification
- Kingdom: Animalia
- Phylum: Arthropoda
- Class: Insecta
- Order: Lepidoptera
- Superfamily: Noctuoidea
- Family: Erebidae
- Subfamily: Arctiinae
- Genus: Teracotona
- Species: T. latifasciata

Binomial name
- Teracotona latifasciata Carcasson, 1965

Species of moth

Teracotona latifasciata is a moth in the family Erebidae. It was described by Robert Herbert Carcasson in 1965. It is found in Tanzania.
