= Teracotona melanocera =

Scientific classification
- Kingdom: Animalia
- Phylum: Arthropoda
- Class: Insecta
- Order: Lepidoptera
- Superfamily: Noctuoidea
- Family: Erebidae
- Subfamily: Arctiinae
- Genus: Teracotona
- Species: T. melanocera

Binomial name
- Teracotona melanocera (Hampson, 1920)

Synonyms
- Seirarctia melanocera Hampson, 1920

Species of moth

Teracotona melanocera is a moth in the family Erebidae. It was described by George Hampson in 1920. It is found in Kenya, Tanzania and Uganda.
