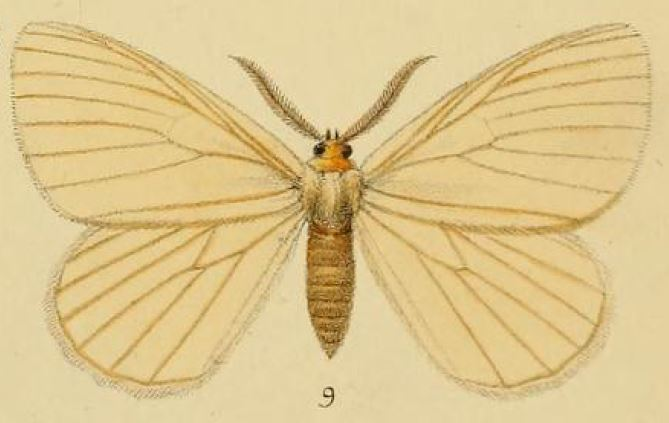

Scientific classification
- Kingdom: Animalia
- Phylum: Arthropoda
- Clade: Pancrustacea
- Class: Insecta
- Order: Lepidoptera
- Family: Eupterotidae
- Genus: Phiala
- Species: P. odites

Binomial name
- Phiala odites (Schaus, 1893)

Synonyms
- Stibolepis odites Schaus, 1893

= Phiala odites =

Species of moth

Phiala odites is a moth in the family Eupterotidae. It was described by Schaus in 1893. It is found in Sierra Leone.

The wingspan is 48 mm. The wings are snowy white, and the outer portion of the veins on the forewings is finely outlined with brown. The veins of the hindwings are yellowish.
