= Phiala hologramma =

Scientific classification
- Kingdom: Animalia
- Phylum: Arthropoda
- Clade: Pancrustacea
- Class: Insecta
- Order: Lepidoptera
- Family: Eupterotidae
- Genus: Phiala
- Species: P. hologramma

Binomial name
- Phiala hologramma (Aurivillius, 1904)

Synonyms
- Stibolepis hologramma Aurivillius, 1904

Species of moth

Phiala hologramma is a moth in the family Eupterotidae. It was described by Per Olof Christopher Aurivillius in 1904. It is found in the Democratic Republic of the Congo (Katanga) and Zimbabwe.

The wingspan is 55 mm. Adults are greyish white, the wings dusted with black scales and adorned with eight distinct waved transverse nearly erect lines, four before the middle, two nearly in the middle and two in the marginal area, the latter more irregular and deeply incurved at vein five. The hindwings are nearly without black scales from the base to the middle, between the middle and the external margin with five transverse waved lines and sparingly dusted with black scales.
