= Digama strabonis =

Scientific classification
- Kingdom: Animalia
- Phylum: Arthropoda
- Class: Insecta
- Order: Lepidoptera
- Superfamily: Noctuoidea
- Family: Erebidae
- Genus: Digama
- Species: D. strabonis

Binomial name
- Digama strabonis Hampson, 1910

Synonyms
- Sommeria strabonis Hampson, 1910

Species of moth

Digama strabonis is a moth of the family Erebidae, subfamily Arctiinae. It is found in Kenya, South Africa, and Zimbabwe.
