= Phiala costipuncta =

Scientific classification
- Kingdom: Animalia
- Phylum: Arthropoda
- Clade: Pancrustacea
- Class: Insecta
- Order: Lepidoptera
- Family: Eupterotidae
- Genus: Phiala
- Species: P. costipuncta

Binomial name
- Phiala costipuncta (Herrich-Schäffer, 1855)

Synonyms
- Heteromorpha costipuncta Herrich-Schäffer, 1855; Phiala angola Strand, 1911; Stibolepis atomaria Holland, 1892; Dasychira atomaria Walker, 1855; Phiala inferior Strand, 1911; Phiala costipuncta ab. ochritincta Strand, 1911; Dasychira punctilinea Walker, 1862; Phiala xanthosoma Wallengren, 1860

Species of moth

Phiala costipuncta is a moth in the family Eupterotidae. It was described by Gottlieb August Wilhelm Herrich-Schäffer in 1855. It is found in Angola, the Democratic Republic of the Congo, Malawi, Namibia, Sierra Leone, South Africa, Tanzania, the Gambia and Zambia.
