= József Gyula Hubertus Szent-Ivány =

József Gyula Hubertus Szent-Ivány AM (3 November 1910 – 8 June 1988) was a Hungarian entomologist who specialized in the Lepidoptera. He worked as a curator of the Hungarian National Museum from 1936 to 1945 before emigrating to Australia. He founded the journal Fragmenta Faunistica Hungarica which was edited by Soós Árpád until 1948 when it was renamed as Folia entomologica hungarica.

Szent-Ivány was born in Budapest matriculating in Rimaszombat followed by studies in Vienna, Austria before returning to Budapest. He obtained a doctorate from the Royal Hungarian University in 1936. He used the name Gyula Hubertus since his father József Szent-Ivány (1894–1941) came from a noble land-owning class and was a political leader in Czechoslovakia. He was married to Mária née Lakatos (1919–2012) who also worked in the museum and was an illustrator and specimen preparator. His father-in-law, Géza Lakatos (1890–1967), was in the Hungarian Army and later became Prime Minister of Hungary. During the war he transferred the collections at his own expense from Budapest to Tihany. He moved to western Europe when the Russians invaded Hungary and in the summer of 1950 he decided to emigrate to Australia. He set up a research station in Konedobu in eastern Papua New Guinea in 1954 and worked on rearing and protection of birdwing butterflies, especially Ornithoptera meridionalis which was valuable among collectors. His wife moved to Australia in 1956 along with a daughter. Maria took an interest in Australian botany, illustrating a book on Solanum. He was involved in the search for the grave of Sámuel Fenichel at Stephansort in the 1970s.

Szent-Ivány published more than 87 papers of which more than half were on butterflies. He translated In Quest of Gorillas (Gregory & Raven, 1937) into Hungarian in 1940. Despite moving to Australia, he was a proud Hungarian and his ex-libris included a portrait of Lajos Bíró. He received the Order of Australia (AM) from Queen Elizabeth II in 1985. He was made a Fellow of the Hungarian Academy of Sciences in 1988, a few days before his death in Adelaide. He bequeathed his library and collections to the Hungarian Museum of Natural History in Budapest.
