= Teracotona pruinosa =

Scientific classification
- Domain: Eukaryota
- Kingdom: Animalia
- Phylum: Arthropoda
- Class: Insecta
- Order: Lepidoptera
- Superfamily: Noctuoidea
- Family: Erebidae
- Subfamily: Arctiinae
- Genus: Teracotona
- Species: T. pruinosa

Binomial name
- Teracotona pruinosa de Joannis, 1912

Species of moth

Teracotona pruinosa is a moth in the family Erebidae. It was described by Joseph de Joannis in 1912. It is found in Eritrea and Ethiopia.
