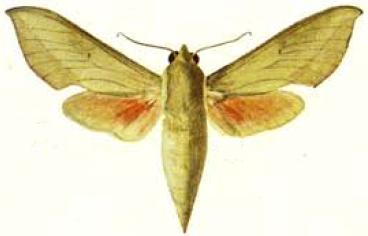

Scientific classification
- Kingdom: Animalia
- Phylum: Arthropoda
- Class: Insecta
- Order: Lepidoptera
- Family: Sphingidae
- Genus: Theretra
- Species: T. capensis

Binomial name
- Theretra capensis (Linnaeus, 1764)

Synonyms
- Sphinx capensis Linnaeus, 1764; Sphinx aeas Cramer, 1779; Sphinx cecrops Cramer, 1779; Sphinx clotho Fabricius, 1787; Sphinx immaculata Gmelin, 1790; Gnathostypsis ostracina Wallengren, 1858; Theretra capensis vinacea (Closs, 1915)

= Theretra capensis =

Species of moth

Theretra capensis is a moth of the family Sphingidae. It is known from woodland and open habitats from the Cape to Zimbabwe, Zambia, Democratic Republic of the Congo, Malawi, Mozambique and East Africa.

The length of the forewings is 44–52 mm.

The larvae feed on Vigna species.
