= Digama meridionalis =

Scientific classification
- Kingdom: Animalia
- Phylum: Arthropoda
- Class: Insecta
- Order: Lepidoptera
- Superfamily: Noctuoidea
- Family: Erebidae
- Genus: Digama
- Species: D. meridionalis

Binomial name
- Digama meridionalis C. Swinhoe, 1907

Synonyms
- Sommeria meridionalis meridionalis Swinhoe, 1907

Species of moth

Digama meridionalis is a moth of the family Erebidae first described by Charles Swinhoe in 1907. It is found in much of southern and eastern Africa.

== Subspecies ==
- Digama meridionalis deliae Berio, 1939 (Ethiopia, Eritrea)
- Digama meridionalis meridionalis Swinhoe, 1907 (South Africa, Zimbabwe)
- Digama meridionalis thamaritica Wiltshire, 1986 (Oman, Saudi Arabia, Yemen)
