= Digama plicata =

Scientific classification
- Domain: Eukaryota
- Kingdom: Animalia
- Phylum: Arthropoda
- Class: Insecta
- Order: Lepidoptera
- Superfamily: Noctuoidea
- Family: Erebidae
- Genus: Digama
- Species: D. plicata

Binomial name
- Digama plicata Pinhey, 1952

Species of moth

Digama plicata is a moth of the family Erebidae. It is found in Africa, including Tanzania.
