= Janomima mariana =

Scientific classification
- Kingdom: Animalia
- Phylum: Arthropoda
- Class: Insecta
- Order: Lepidoptera
- Family: Eupterotidae
- Genus: Janomima
- Species: J. mariana

Binomial name
- Janomima mariana (White, 1843)

Synonyms
- Bombyx mariana White, 1843; Janomima nigricans Gaede, 1927; Janomima westwoodi Aurivillius, 1901

Species of moth

Janomima mariana, the inquisitive monkey, is a moth in the family Eupterotidae first described by Adam White in 1843. It is found in the Democratic Republic of the Congo, Eritrea, Mozambique, Rwanda, South Africa, Tanzania, Zambia and Zimbabwe.

The larvae feed on various grasses and have been specifically reported feeding on Bauhinia and Brachystegia species, as well as Pterocarpus rotundifolius and Miscanthus violaceus.
