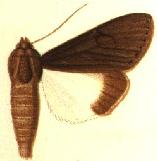

Scientific classification
- Kingdom: Animalia
- Phylum: Arthropoda
- Clade: Pancrustacea
- Class: Insecta
- Order: Lepidoptera
- Superfamily: Noctuoidea
- Family: Erebidae
- Genus: Audea
- Species: A. melaleuca

Binomial name
- Audea melaleuca Walker, 1865

Synonyms
- Audea postalbida Berio, 1954

= Audea melaleuca =

Species of moth

Audea melaleuca is a species of moth in the family Erebidae. It is found in Cameroon, Cape Verde, Eritrea, Mauritania, Nigeria and South Africa.
