= Digama africana =

Scientific classification
- Domain: Eukaryota
- Kingdom: Animalia
- Phylum: Arthropoda
- Class: Insecta
- Order: Lepidoptera
- Superfamily: Noctuoidea
- Family: Erebidae
- Genus: Digama
- Species: D. africana

Binomial name
- Digama africana C. Swinhoe, 1907

Synonyms
- Sommeria africana Swinhoe, 1907

Species of moth

Digama africana is a moth of the family Erebidae first described by Charles Swinhoe in 1907. It is found in Eritrea, Kenya and Tanzania.
