= Teracotona proditrix =

Scientific classification
- Domain: Eukaryota
- Kingdom: Animalia
- Phylum: Arthropoda
- Class: Insecta
- Order: Lepidoptera
- Superfamily: Noctuoidea
- Family: Erebidae
- Subfamily: Arctiinae
- Genus: Teracotona
- Species: T. proditrix

Binomial name
- Teracotona proditrix (Berio, 1939)

Synonyms
- Seirarctia proditrix Berio, 1939

Species of moth

Teracotona proditrix is a type of moth in the family Erebidae. It was described by Emilio Berio in 1939. It is found in Eritrea and Ethiopia.
