= Phiala longilinea =

Scientific classification
- Kingdom: Animalia
- Phylum: Arthropoda
- Clade: Pancrustacea
- Class: Insecta
- Order: Lepidoptera
- Family: Eupterotidae
- Genus: Phiala
- Species: P. longilinea

Binomial name
- Phiala longilinea Berio, 1939

Species of moth

Phiala longilinea is a moth in the family Eupterotidae. It was described by Emilio Berio in 1939. It is found in Eritrea.
