= Phiala alba =

Scientific classification
- Kingdom: Animalia
- Phylum: Arthropoda
- Clade: Pancrustacea
- Class: Insecta
- Order: Lepidoptera
- Family: Eupterotidae
- Genus: Phiala
- Species: P. alba

Binomial name
- Phiala alba (Aurivillius, 1893)

Synonyms
- Lichenopteryx alba Aurivillius, 1893; Phiala difficilis Strand, 1911; Phiala pagagna Strand, 1911; Phiala strigifera Strand, 1911

Species of moth

Phiala alba is a moth in the family Eupterotidae. It was described by Per Olof Christopher Aurivillius in 1893. It is found in the Democratic Republic of the Congo (Katanga), Eritrea, Ethiopia, Malawi and Tanzania.
