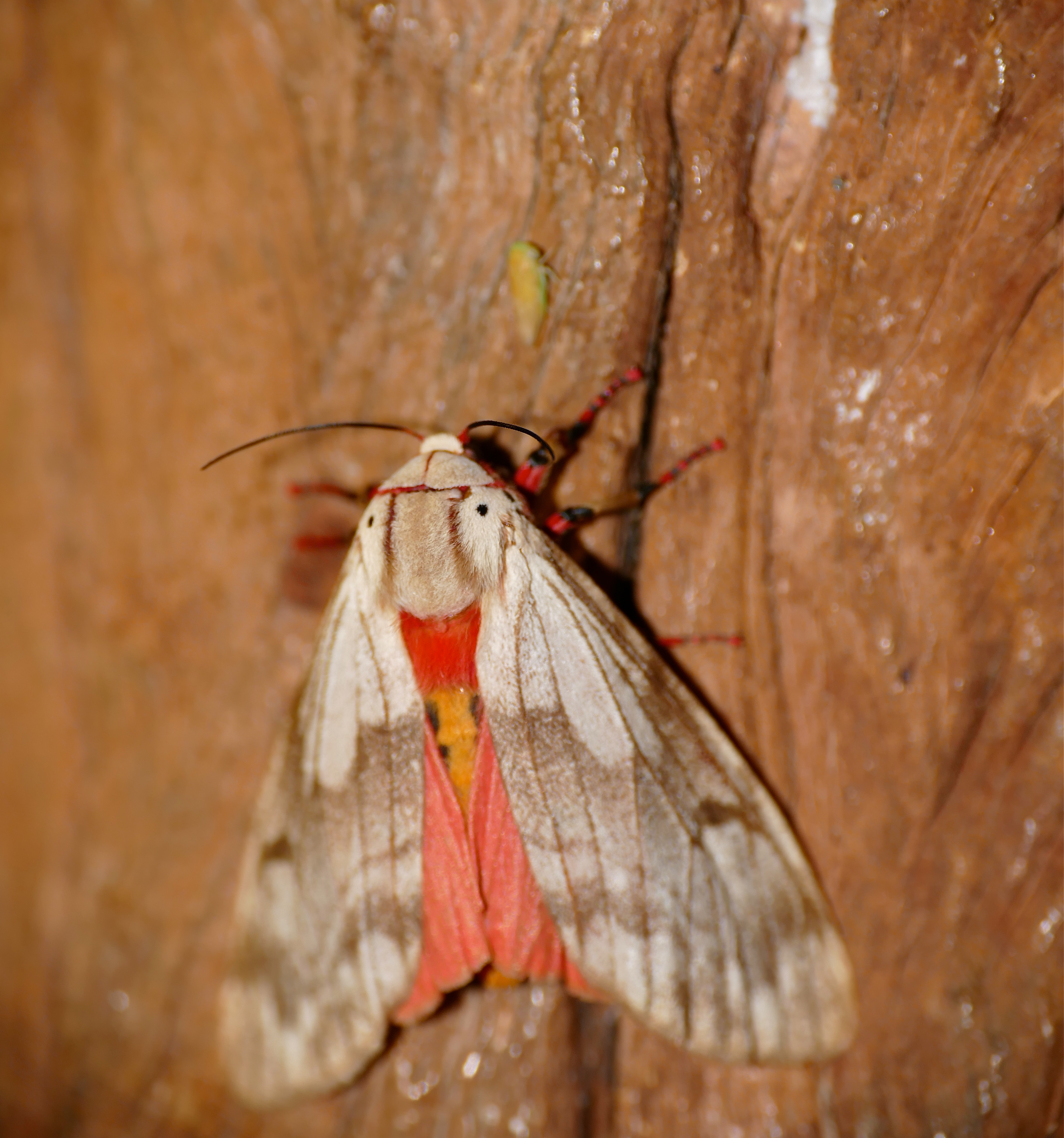
- In Kruger National Park, South Africa

Scientific classification
- Kingdom: Animalia
- Phylum: Arthropoda
- Clade: Pancrustacea
- Class: Insecta
- Order: Lepidoptera
- Superfamily: Noctuoidea
- Family: Erebidae
- Subfamily: Arctiinae
- Genus: Teracotona
- Species: T. rhodophaea

Binomial name
- Teracotona rhodophaea (Walker, [1865])

Synonyms
- Aloa rhodophaea Walker, [1865]; Macronyx debilis Felder, 1874; Teracotona rhodophaea f. obscurior Wichgraf, 1908; Teracotona rhodophaea f. quadripunctata Wichgraf, 1908; Teracotona rhodophaea f. irregularis Gaede, 1926; Teracotona rhodophaea f. palldior Niepelt, 1937

= Teracotona rhodophaea =

Species of moth

Teracotona rhodophaea is a moth in the family Erebidae. It was described by Francis Walker in 1865. It is found in Botswana, Djibouti, Eritrea, Kenya, Namibia, Senegal, Somalia, South Africa, Tanzania, Togo, Zambia and Zimbabwe.

The larvae feed on Commelina species.
