= Digama hearseyana =

Scientific classification
- Domain: Eukaryota
- Kingdom: Animalia
- Phylum: Arthropoda
- Class: Insecta
- Order: Lepidoptera
- Superfamily: Noctuoidea
- Family: Erebidae
- Genus: Digama
- Species: D. hearseyana

Binomial name
- Digama hearseyana Moore, 1859

Synonyms
- Digama piepersiana Snellen, 1879

Species of moth

Digama hearseyana is a moth of the family Erebidae described by Frederic Moore in 1859. It is found in India, Nepal, Sri Lanka and Pakistan. Two subspecies are recognized.

== Description ==
The wingspan is about 30 mm. Antennae of male with fasciculate cilia. Head and thorax brownish fuscous and abdomen orange yellow. Forewing pale fuscous clouded with duller fuscous. Basal half of wing spotted with black, four spots on costa, three spots on cell, three spots in interno-medial interspace and two spots in inner margin. Sub-marginal and marginal fuscous bands are irregular and dentate. Hindwings are orange yellow with fuscous marginal patches at apex.

== Subspecies ==
- Digama hearseyana hearseyana (India, Nepal, Pakistan, Sri Lanka)
- Digama hearseyana similis (north-eastern India)
