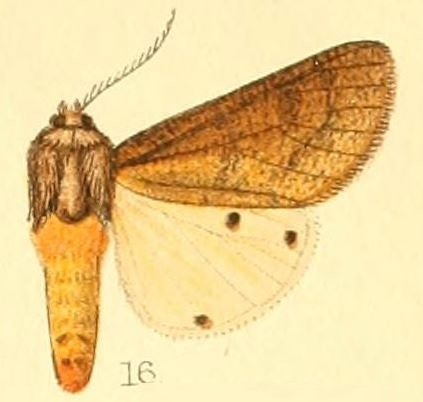

Scientific classification
- Kingdom: Animalia
- Phylum: Arthropoda
- Class: Insecta
- Order: Lepidoptera
- Superfamily: Noctuoidea
- Family: Erebidae
- Subfamily: Arctiinae
- Genus: Teracotona
- Species: T. subterminata

Binomial name
- Teracotona subterminata Hampson, 1901

Synonyms
- Seirarctia sordida Rothschild, 1917

= Teracotona subterminata =

Species of moth

Teracotona subterminata is a moth of the family Erebidae. It is found in Eritrea, Ethiopia, Kenya and Tanzania.
