= Janomima dannfelti =

Scientific classification
- Kingdom: Animalia
- Phylum: Arthropoda
- Clade: Pancrustacea
- Class: Insecta
- Order: Lepidoptera
- Family: Eupterotidae
- Genus: Janomima
- Species: J. dannfelti

Binomial name
- Janomima dannfelti (Aurivillius, 1893)

Synonyms
- Jana dannfelti Aurivillius, 1893; Janomima deduplicata Strand, 1911; Janomima karschi Weymer, 1903; Janomima mesundulata Strand, 1911

Species of moth

Janomima dannfelti is a moth in the family Eupterotidae. It was described by Per Olof Christopher Aurivillius in 1893. It is found in Burundi, Cameroon, the Democratic Republic of the Congo, Equatorial Guinea, Eritrea, Malawi, South Africa and Uganda.
