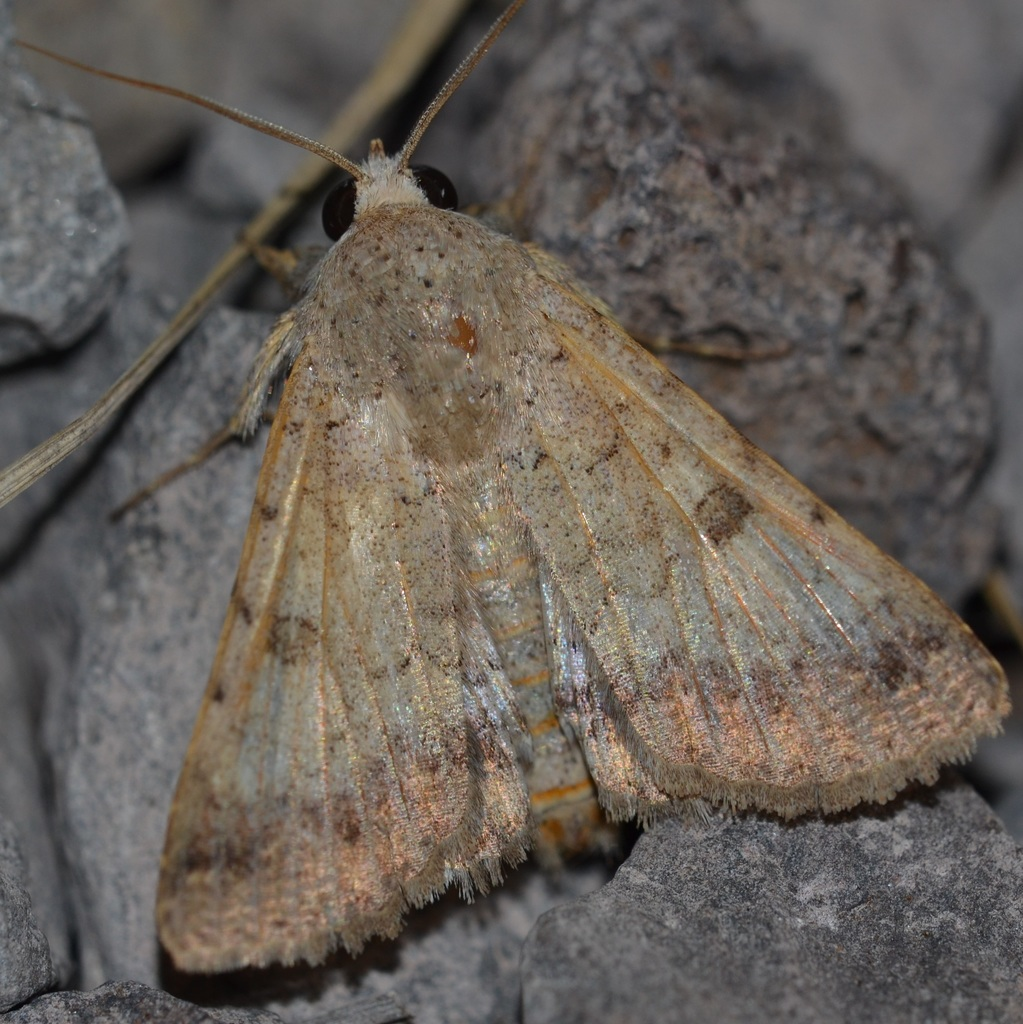

Scientific classification
- Kingdom: Animalia
- Phylum: Arthropoda
- Clade: Pancrustacea
- Class: Insecta
- Order: Lepidoptera
- Superfamily: Noctuoidea
- Family: Erebidae
- Genus: Pandesma
- Species: P. anysa

Binomial name
- Pandesma anysa Guenée, 1852

= Pandesma anysa =

Species of moth

Pandesma anysa is a moth of the family Erebidae. It is native to south-eastern Asia, including India and subtropical Africa. It is an introduced species in Hawaii.

The larvae feed on the leaves of Pithecellobium dulce, Acacia and Prosopis. The pupae are encased in frass and earthen cells.
