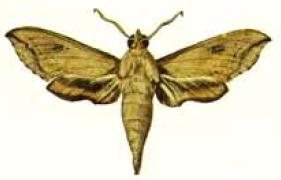

Scientific classification
- Kingdom: Animalia
- Phylum: Arthropoda
- Class: Insecta
- Order: Lepidoptera
- Family: Sphingidae
- Genus: Hippotion
- Species: H. roseipennis

Binomial name
- Hippotion roseipennis (Butler, 1882)

Synonyms
- Diodosida roseipennis Butler, 1882; Hippotion exclamationis Fawcett, 1915; Hippotion exclamationis robur Jordan, 1938; Hippotion exclamationis austrinum Jordan, 1930

= Hippotion roseipennis =

Species of moth

Hippotion roseipennis is a moth of the family Sphingidae. It is known from dry areas from KwaZulu-Natal and Mozambique to Zimbabwe, Zambia, Malawi, Tanzania, Kenya, Uganda and south-western Ethiopia.

The larvae feed on the leaves of Rhoicissus tridentata.
