= Amsactarctia pulchra =

Scientific classification
- Kingdom: Animalia
- Phylum: Arthropoda
- Class: Insecta
- Order: Lepidoptera
- Superfamily: Noctuoidea
- Family: Erebidae
- Subfamily: Arctiinae
- Genus: Amsactarctia
- Species: A. pulchra

Binomial name
- Amsactarctia pulchra (Rothschild, 1933)

Synonyms
- Amsacta pulchra Rothschild, 1933

Species of moth

Amsactarctia pulchra is a moth of the family Erebidae. It was described by Walter Rothschild in 1933. It is found in Ethiopia and Kenya.
