= Stenoma staudingerana =

Scientific classification
- Domain: Eukaryota
- Kingdom: Animalia
- Phylum: Arthropoda
- Class: Insecta
- Order: Lepidoptera
- Family: Depressariidae
- Genus: Stenoma
- Species: S. staudingerana

Binomial name
- Stenoma staudingerana (Maassen, 1890)

Synonyms
- Totrix staudingerana Maassen, 1890; Stenoma contophora Meyrick, 1915; Stenoma heterosema Meyrick, 1930

Species of moth

Stenoma staudingerana is a moth of the family Depressariidae. It is found in the Colombia, French Guiana and Pará, Brazil.

The wingspan is about 28 mm. The forewings are light brownish with the extreme costal edge pale ochreous yellowish and with a straight dark brown line from one-fifth of the costa to four-fifths of the dorsum, anteriorly edged with yellow-ochreous suffusion. There is a faint small fuscous spot on the middle of the costa and there are two dark fuscous dots transversely placed on the end of the cell. A faint slender slightly curved transverse fuscous line is found at four-fifths and there is a terminal series of small indistinct dark fuscous dots. The hindwings are pale ochreous yellowish, on the dorsal half hardly perceptibly greyish tinged.
