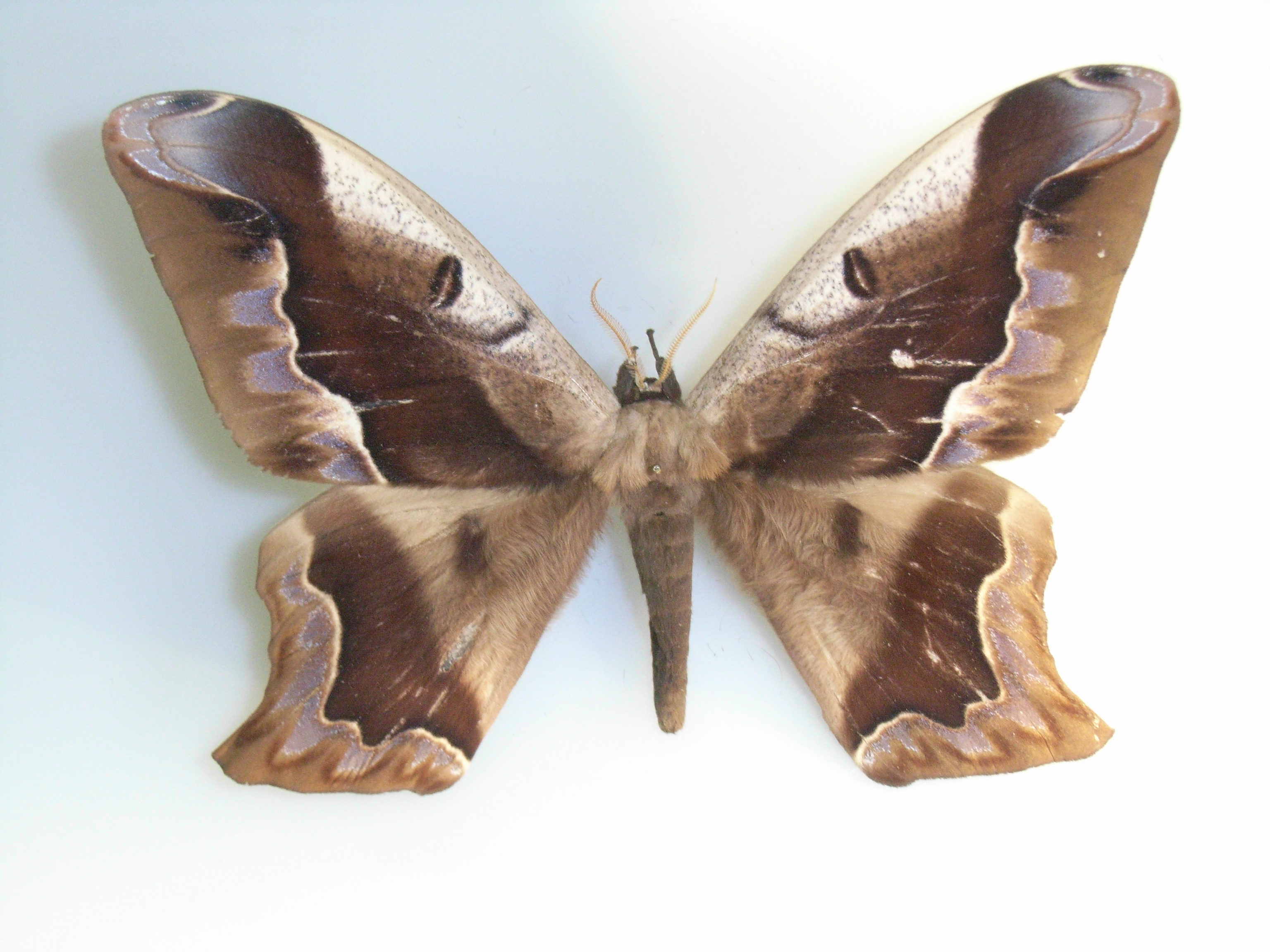

Scientific classification
- Kingdom: Animalia
- Phylum: Arthropoda
- Class: Insecta
- Order: Lepidoptera
- Family: Saturniidae
- Genus: Arsenura
- Species: A. sylla

Binomial name
- Arsenura sylla (Cramer, 1779)

= Arsenura sylla =

Species of moth

Arsenura sylla is a moth of the family Saturniidae first described by Pieter Cramer in 1779. It is found from Venezuela south to Mato Grosso, Brazil and then west to Bolivia.

It is a large species. Males have a semblance of a tail and the female has an almost rounded rear wing.

One of its close relatives is the Arsenura armida moth, which is also found in Venezuela.

== Subspecies ==
- Arsenura sylla sylla
- Arsenura sylla niepelti (western Colombia, Costa Rica, Ecuador)
