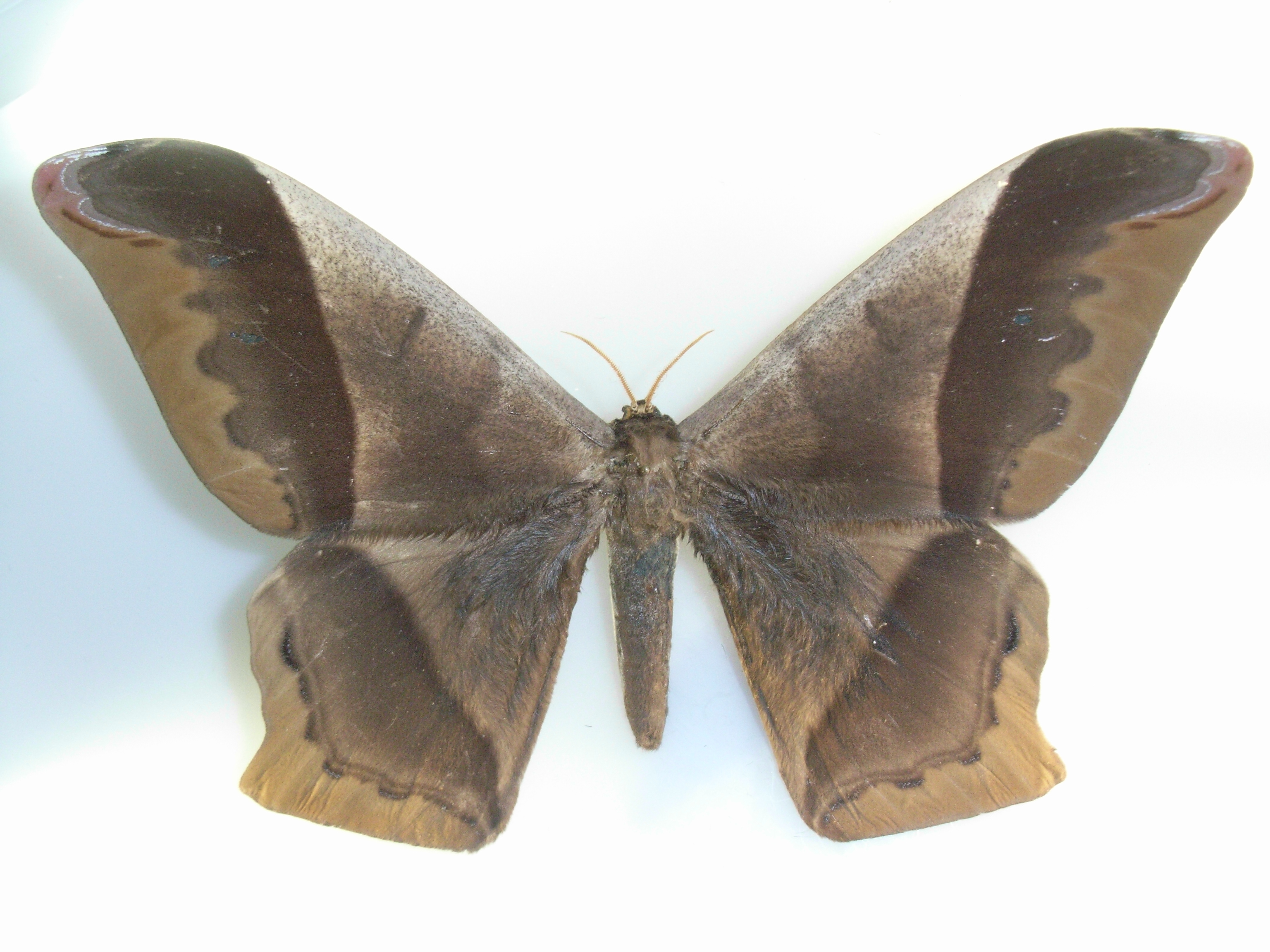

Scientific classification
- Domain: Eukaryota
- Kingdom: Animalia
- Phylum: Arthropoda
- Class: Insecta
- Order: Lepidoptera
- Family: Saturniidae
- Genus: Arsenura
- Species: A. rebeli

Binomial name
- Arsenura rebeli Gschwandner, 1920

= Arsenura rebeli =

Species of moth

Arsenura rebeli is a moth of the family Saturniidae. It is found in the Andes, from Ecuador, south to Bolivia.

The wingspan is 145–150 mm.

One of A. rebeli's close relatives is Arsenura armida, which is also found in Bolivia.
