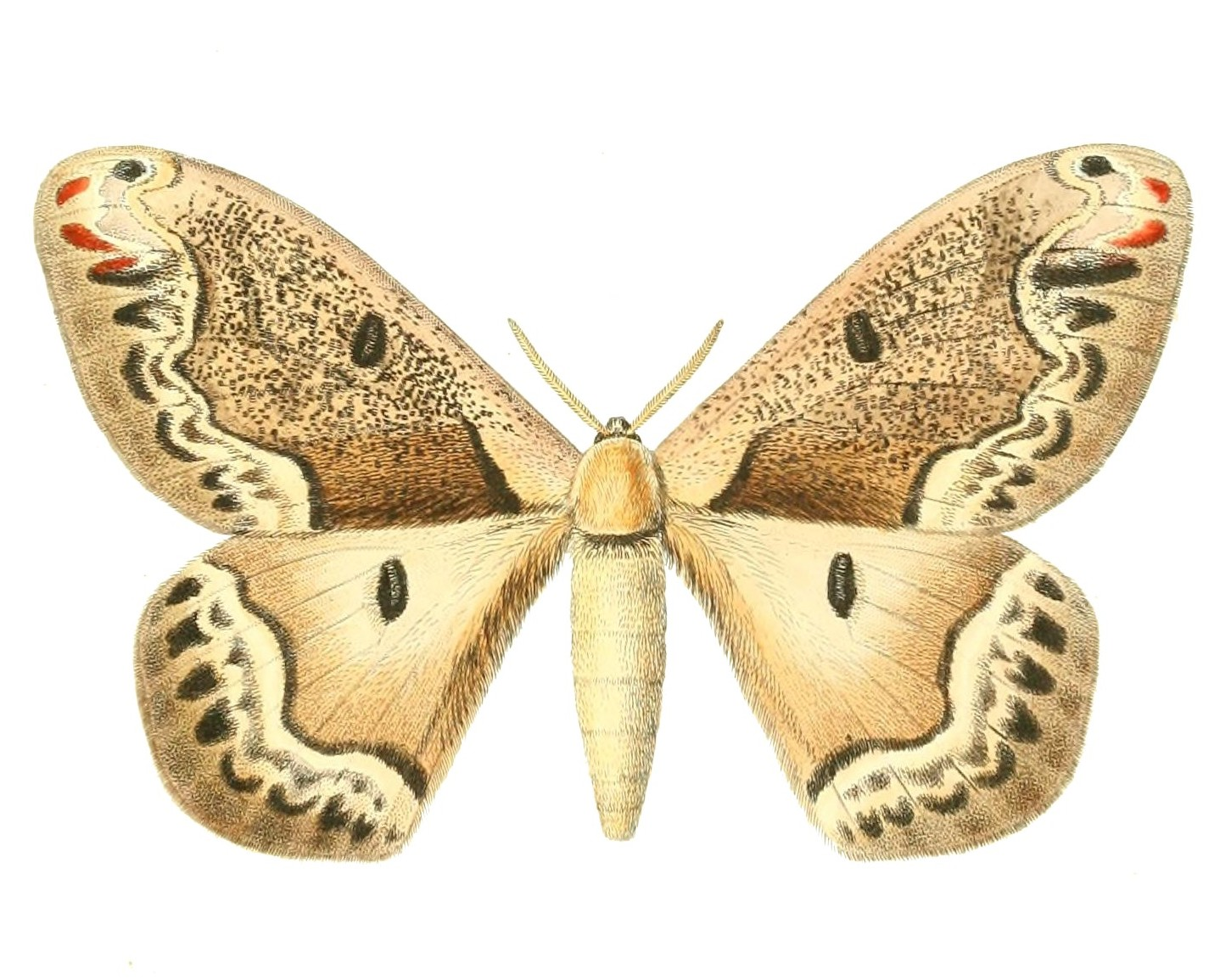

Scientific classification
- Domain: Eukaryota
- Kingdom: Animalia
- Phylum: Arthropoda
- Class: Insecta
- Order: Lepidoptera
- Family: Saturniidae
- Genus: Arsenura
- Species: A. pandora

Binomial name
- Arsenura pandora (Klug, 1836)

Synonyms
- Saturnia pandora Klug, 1836

= Arsenura pandora =

Species of moth

Arsenura pandora is a moth of the family Saturniidae. It is known from Brazil. One of Arsenura pandora's close relatives is Arsenura armida, which is also found in Brazil.
