= Wild syringa =

Wild syringa is a common name for several plants and may refer to:

- Burkea africana
- Philadelphus
