= Sarosa leuce =

Scientific classification
- Domain: Eukaryota
- Kingdom: Animalia
- Phylum: Arthropoda
- Class: Insecta
- Order: Lepidoptera
- Superfamily: Noctuoidea
- Family: Erebidae
- Subfamily: Arctiinae
- Genus: Sarosa
- Species: S. leuce

Binomial name
- Sarosa leuce (Maassen, 1890)

Synonyms
- Dasysphinx leuce Maassen, 1890

Species of moth

Sarosa leuce is a moth of the subfamily Arctiinae. It was described by Peter Maassen in 1890. It is found in Colombia.
