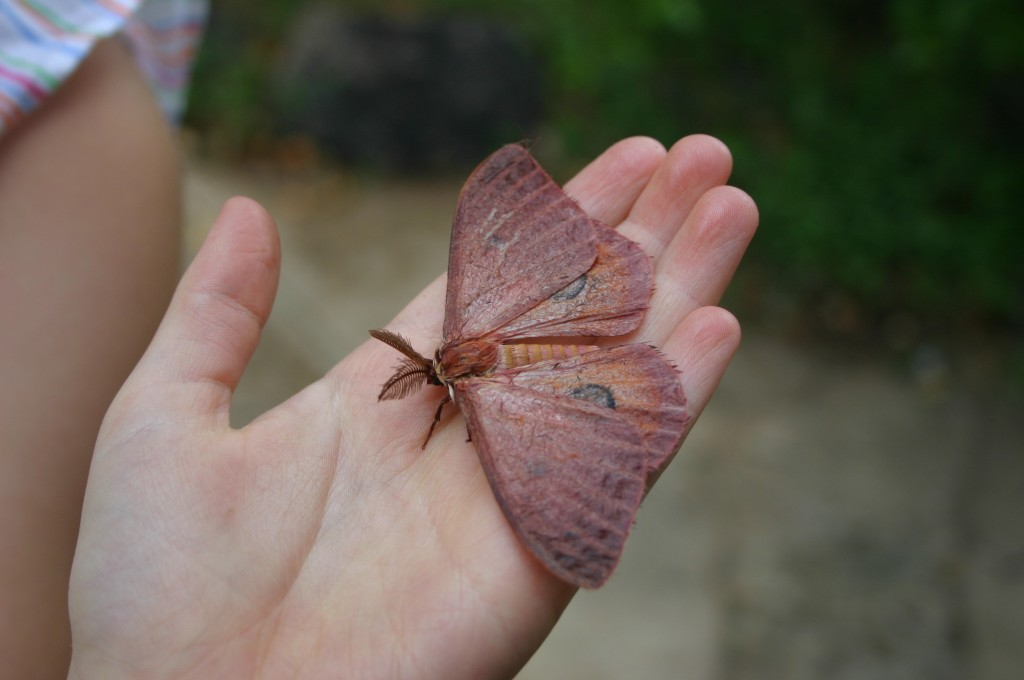

Scientific classification
- Domain: Eukaryota
- Kingdom: Animalia
- Phylum: Arthropoda
- Class: Insecta
- Order: Lepidoptera
- Family: Saturniidae
- Genus: Rohaniella
- Species: R. pygmaea

Binomial name
- Rohaniella pygmaea (Maassen & Weymer, 1885)

= Rohaniella pygmaea =

Species of moth

Rohaniella pygmaea, the pigmy emperor, is a moth of the family Saturniidae. It is found in Africa, including Namibia and South Africa. The species was first described by Peter Maassen and Gustav Weymer in 1885.

The larvae feed on Burkea africana. The larvae are consumed and are considered a delicacy.
