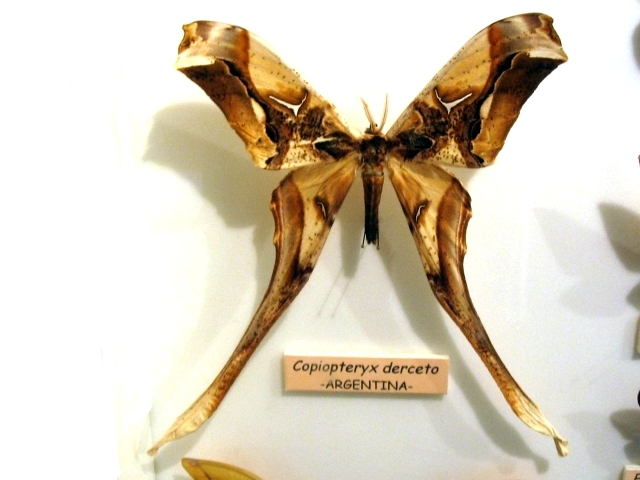

Scientific classification
- Domain: Eukaryota
- Kingdom: Animalia
- Phylum: Arthropoda
- Class: Insecta
- Order: Lepidoptera
- Family: Saturniidae
- Genus: Copiopteryx
- Species: C. derceto

Binomial name
- Copiopteryx derceto Maassen & Weymer, 1872

= Copiopteryx derceto =

Species of moth

Copiopteryx derceto is a moth of the family Saturniidae. It is found in South America, including Brazil.
