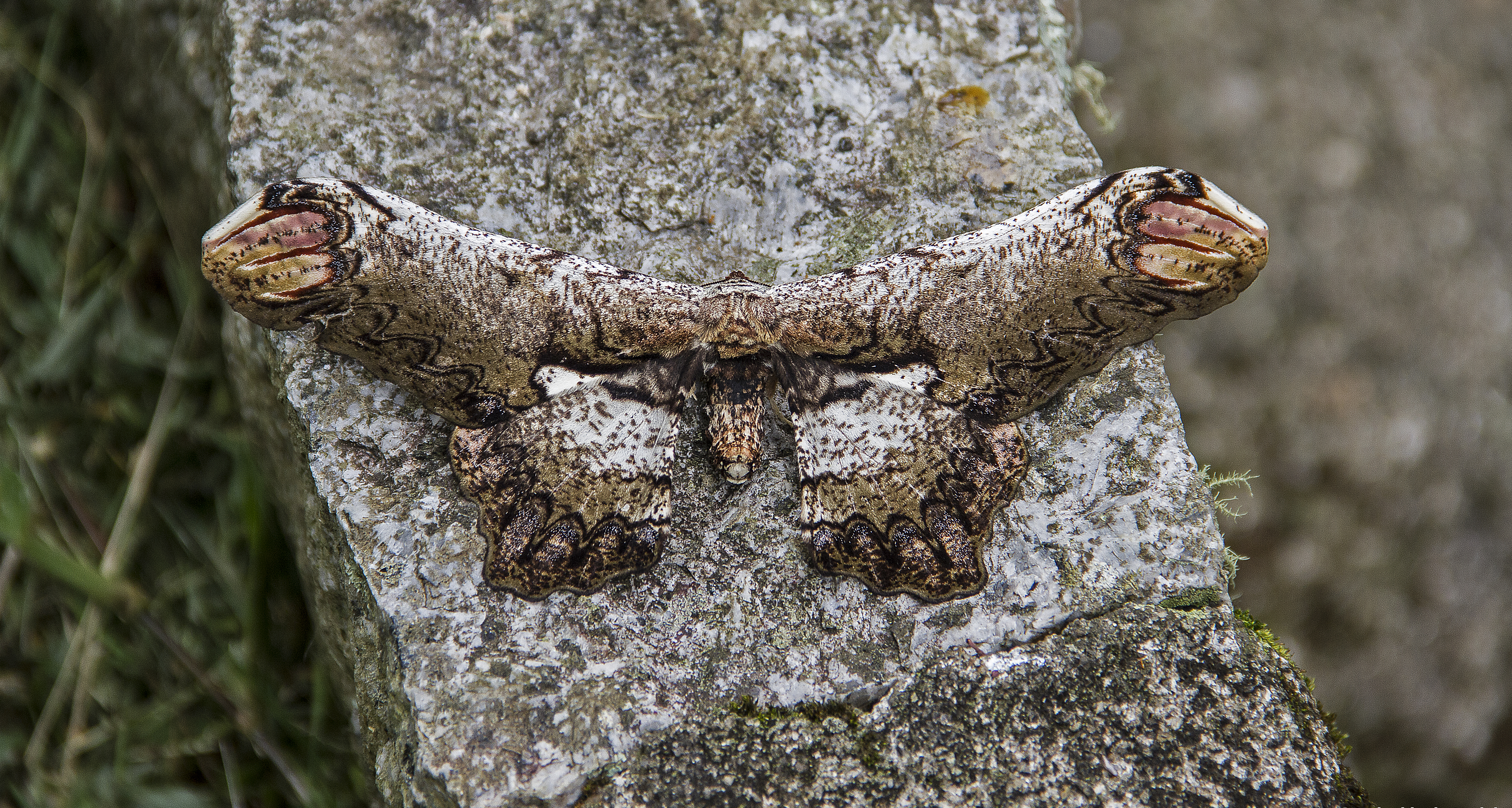
- Loxolomia serpentina

Scientific classification
- Kingdom: Animalia
- Phylum: Arthropoda
- Class: Insecta
- Order: Lepidoptera
- Family: Saturniidae
- Subfamily: Arsenurinae
- Genus: Loxolomia; Maassen, 1869

Type species
- Loxolomia serpentina Maassen, 1869

= Loxolomia =

Genus of moths

Loxolomia is a genus of moths in the family Saturniidae first described by Peter Maassen in 1869.

== Species ==
- Loxolomia johnsoni Schaus, 1932
- Loxolomia serpentina Maassen, 1869
- Loxolomia winbrechlini Brechlin & Meister, 2013
