= Eupithecia famularia =

Scientific classification
- Domain: Eukaryota
- Kingdom: Animalia
- Phylum: Arthropoda
- Class: Insecta
- Order: Lepidoptera
- Family: Geometridae
- Genus: Eupithecia
- Species: E. famularia

Binomial name
- Eupithecia famularia (Maassen, 1890)

Synonyms
- Cidaria famularia Maassen, 1890

Species of moth

Eupithecia famularia is a moth in the family Geometridae. It is found in Ecuador.
