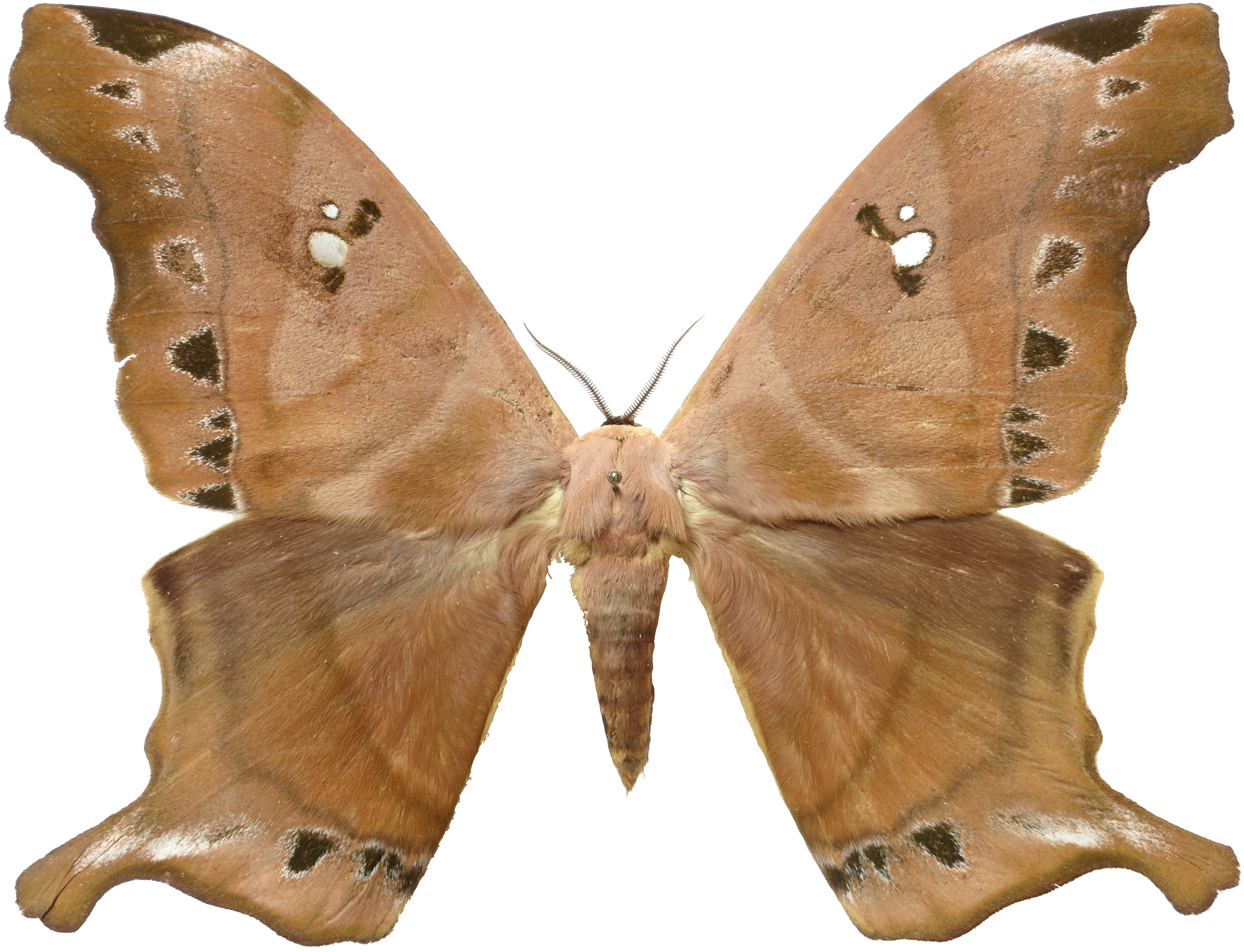
- Titaea tamerlan amazonensis

Scientific classification
- Kingdom: Animalia
- Phylum: Arthropoda
- Clade: Pancrustacea
- Class: Insecta
- Order: Lepidoptera
- Family: Saturniidae
- Genus: Titaea
- Species: T. tamerlan

Binomial name
- Titaea tamerlan (Maassen, 1869)

Synonyms
- Dysdaemonia tamerlan Maassen, 1869; Dysdaemonia nobilis Schaus, 1912; Dysdaemonia tamerlan var. andicola Bouvier, 1927; Dysdaemonia tamerlan f. columbiana Draudt, 1930; Dysdaemonia avangareza Schaus, 1932; Dysdaemonia guayaquila Schaus, 1932

= Titaea tamerlan =

Species of moth

Titaea tamerlan is a moth of the family Saturniidae found in Central and South America.

In Costa Rica, adults are on wing from June to July and again in fall.

The larvae feed on Bombax species, Bombacopsis quinatum and Tilia platyphyllos, and possibly kopak trees.

== Subspecies ==
- Titaea tamerlan tamerlan (Brazil)
- Titaea tamerlan amazonensis Lemaire, 1980 (Colombia, Venezuela, Guyana, Surinam, French Guiana, Ecuador, Peru, Brazil)
- Titaea tamerlan guayaquila (Schaus, 1932) (Ecuador, Peru)
- Titaea tamerlan nobilis (Schaus, 1912) (Mexico, Belize, Costa Rica, Panama, Colombia, Ecuador, Peru, Venezuela)
