= Burkea =

Burkea may refer to:

- Burkea (plant), a genus of flowering plants in the family Fabaceae
- Burkea (microsporidian), a fungus genus in the division Microsporidia
