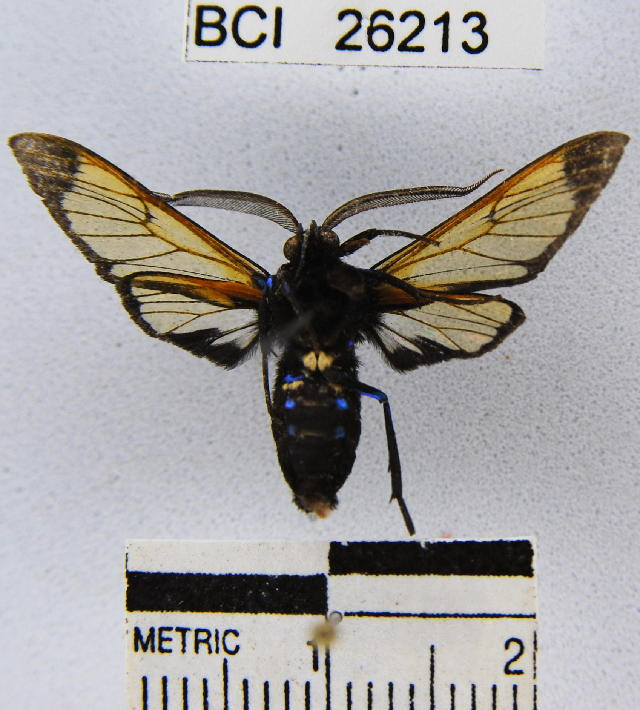

Scientific classification
- Domain: Eukaryota
- Kingdom: Animalia
- Phylum: Arthropoda
- Class: Insecta
- Order: Lepidoptera
- Superfamily: Noctuoidea
- Family: Erebidae
- Subfamily: Arctiinae
- Genus: Sarosa
- Species: S. mora

Binomial name
- Sarosa mora Schaus, 1911

= Sarosa mora =

Species of moth

Sarosa mora is a moth in the subfamily Arctiinae. It was described by William Schaus in 1911. It is found in Costa Rica, Panama and Nicaragua.
