= Sarosa ignicornis =

Scientific classification
- Kingdom: Animalia
- Phylum: Arthropoda
- Class: Insecta
- Order: Lepidoptera
- Superfamily: Noctuoidea
- Family: Erebidae
- Subfamily: Arctiinae
- Genus: Sarosa
- Species: S. ignicornis

Binomial name
- Sarosa ignicornis Hampson, 1914

Species of moth

Sarosa ignicornis is a moth in the subfamily Arctiinae. It was described by George Hampson in 1914. It is found in French Guiana.
