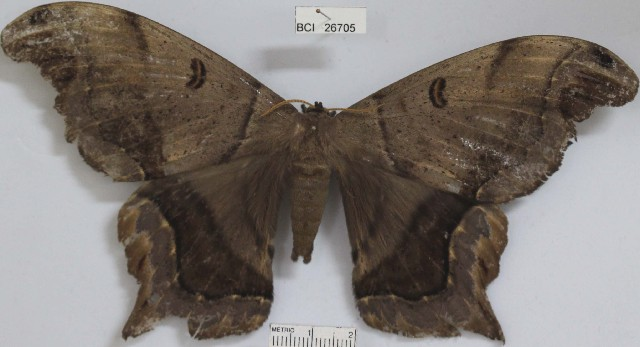

Scientific classification
- Kingdom: Animalia
- Phylum: Arthropoda
- Class: Insecta
- Order: Lepidoptera
- Family: Saturniidae
- Genus: Caio
- Species: C. championi

Binomial name
- Caio championi (Druce, 1886)

Synonyms
- Arsenura championi Druce, 1886; Rhescyntis columbiana Rothschild, 1907

= Caio championi =

Species of moth

Caio championi is a large moth of the family Saturniidae first described by Druce in 1886. It is found from Mexico to Guatemala, south to western Ecuador and northern Venezuela.

== Subspecies ==
- Caio championi championi
- Caio championi columbiana (Rothschild, 1907) (Colombia)
