= Sarosa flavicostalis =

Scientific classification
- Domain: Eukaryota
- Kingdom: Animalia
- Phylum: Arthropoda
- Class: Insecta
- Order: Lepidoptera
- Superfamily: Noctuoidea
- Family: Erebidae
- Subfamily: Arctiinae
- Genus: Sarosa
- Species: S. flavicostalis

Binomial name
- Sarosa flavicostalis Rothschild, 1911

Species of moth

Sarosa flavicostalis is a moth in the subfamily Arctiinae. It was described by Rothschild in 1911. It is found in Peru.
