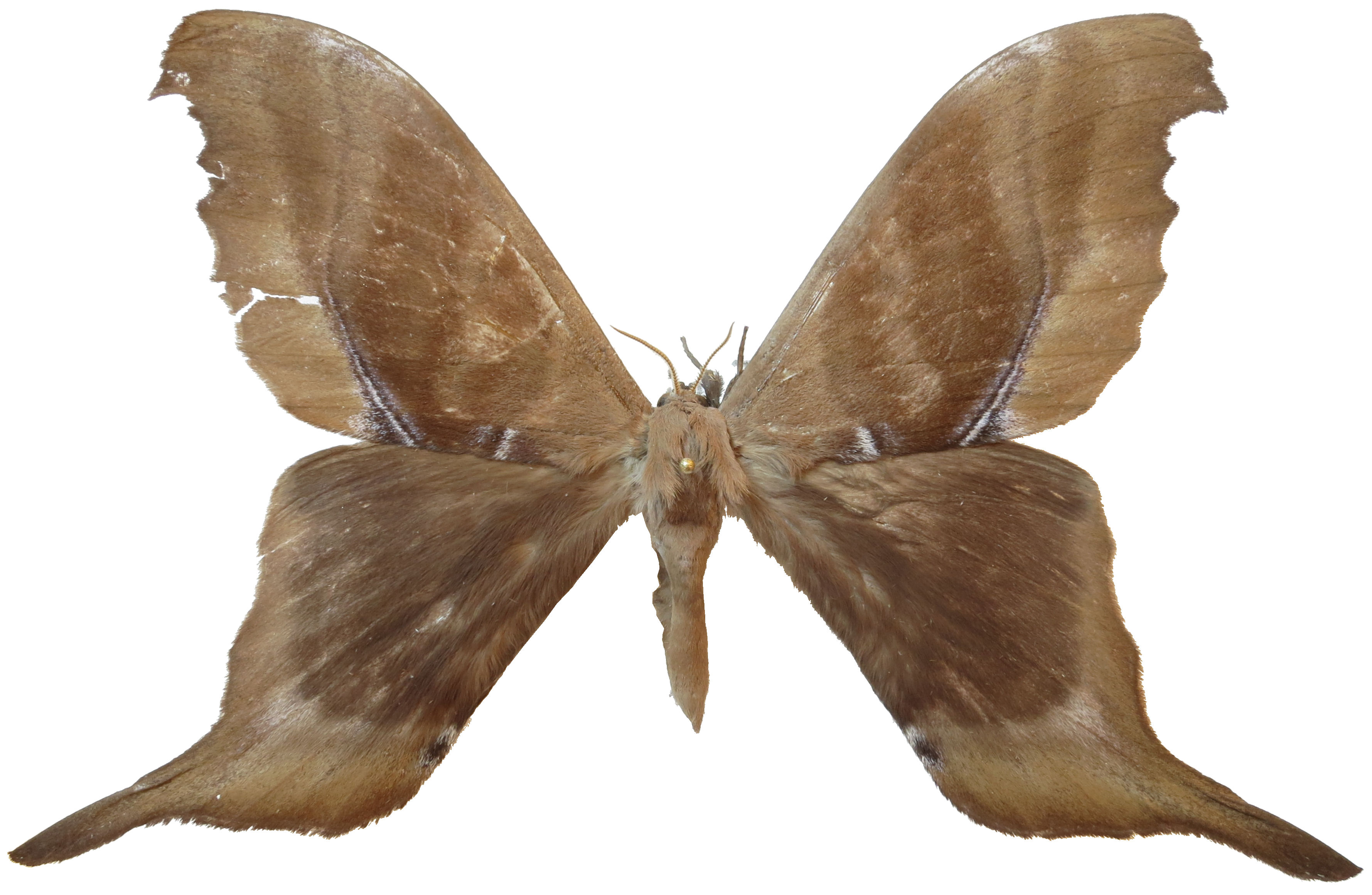
- Paradaemonia terrena

Scientific classification
- Kingdom: Animalia
- Phylum: Arthropoda
- Class: Insecta
- Order: Lepidoptera
- Family: Saturniidae
- Subfamily: Arsenurinae
- Genus: Paradaemonia; Bouvier, 1925

= Paradaemonia =

Genus of moths

Paradaemonia is a genus of moths in the family Saturniidae first described by Eugène Louis Bouvier in 1925.

== Species ==
The genus includes the following species:

- Paradaemonia andensis (Rothschild, 1907)
- Paradaemonia andina (Fassl, 1920)
- Paradaemonia bahiana Brechlin & Meister, 2012
- Paradaemonia balsasensis C. Mielke & Furtado, 2005
- Paradaemonia berlai Oiticica Filho, 1946
- Paradaemonia caligula (Girard, 1882)
- Paradaemonia castanea (W. Rothschild, 1907)
- Paradaemonia championi (Sonthonnax, 1904)
- Paradaemonia despinayi (Bouvier, 1923)
- Paradaemonia glaucescens (Walker, 1855)
- Paradaemonia gravis (Jordan, 1922)
- Paradaemonia guianensis Bouvier, 1925
- Paradaemonia iscaybambensis Brechlin & Meister, 2013
- Paradaemonia kadenii (Herrich-Schäffer, 1855)
- Paradaemonia mayi (Jordan, 1922)
- Paradaemonia meridionalis de Camargo, Mielke, & Casagrande, 2007
- Paradaemonia nycteris (Jordan, 1922)
- Paradaemonia octavus (Herrich-Schäffer, 1858)
- Paradaemonia orsilochus (Maassen, 1869)
- Paradaemonia platydesmia (W. Rothschild, 1907)
- Paradaemonia pluto (Westwood, 1854)
- Paradaemonia rufomaculata Bouvier, 1929
- Paradaemonia ruschii May & Oiticica Filho, 1943
- Paradaemonia samba (Schaus, 1906)
- Paradaemonia siriae Brechlin, Meister & van Schayck, 2012
- Paradaemonia terrena (Jordan, 1922)
- Paradaemonia thelia (Jordan, 1922)
- Paradaemonia vanschaycki Brechlin & Meister, 2012
- Paradaemonia wagneri (Bouvier, 1924)
- Paradaemonia winbrechlini Brechlin & Meister, 2012
