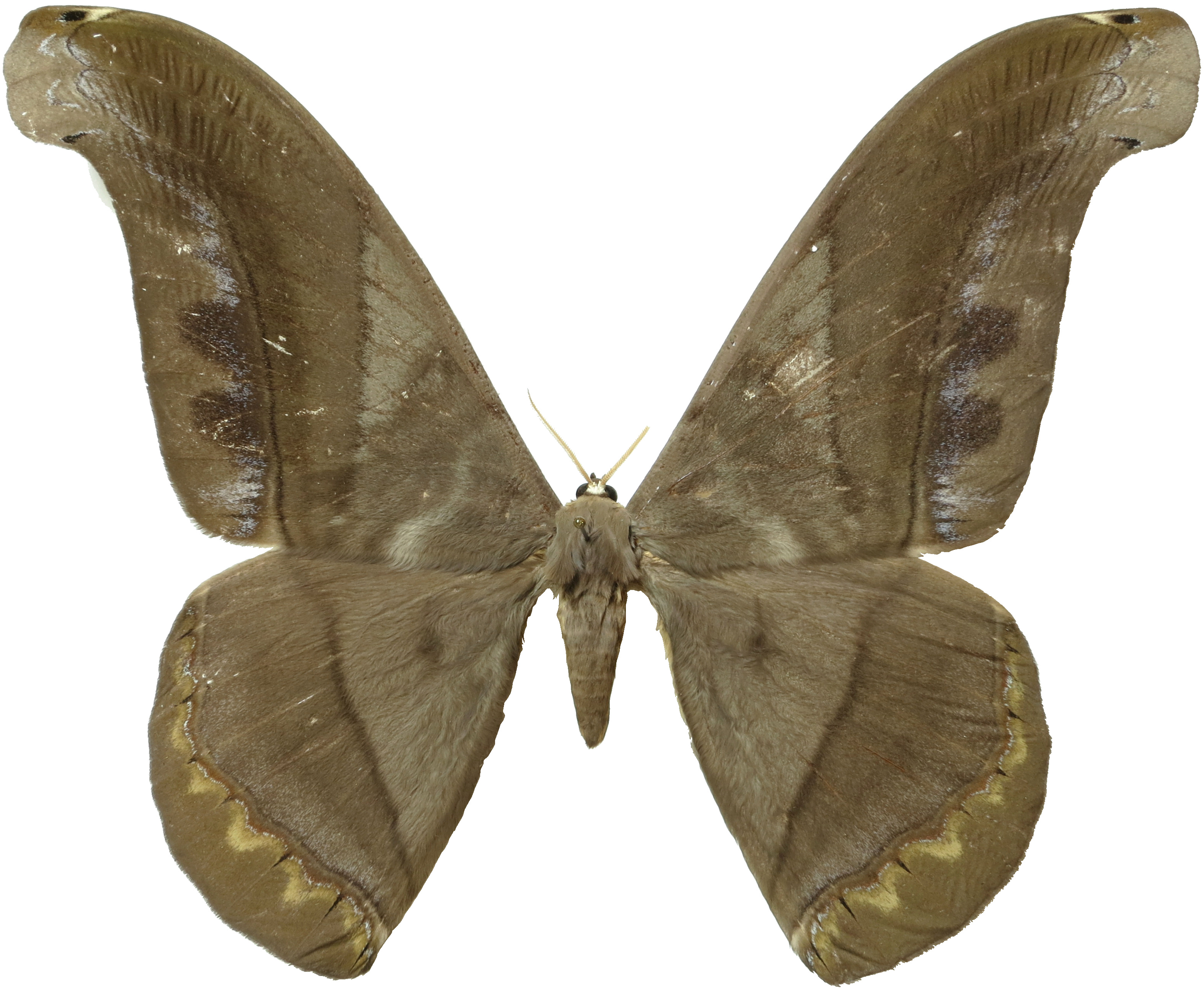
- Rhescyntis hermes

Scientific classification
- Kingdom: Animalia
- Phylum: Arthropoda
- Class: Insecta
- Order: Lepidoptera
- Family: Saturniidae
- Subfamily: Arsenurinae
- Genus: Rhescyntis; Hübner, 1819

Synonyms
- Machaerosema Rothschild, 1907

= Rhescyntis =

Genus of moths

Rhescyntis is a genus of moths in the family Saturniidae first described by Jacob Hübner in 1819.

== Species ==
- Rhescyntis colombiana Bouvier, 1927
- Rhescyntis descimoni Lemaire, 1975
- Rhescyntis gigantea Bouvier, 1930
- Rhescyntis guianensis Bouvier, 1924
- Rhescyntis hermes (W. Rothschild, 1907)
- Rhescyntis hippodamia (Cramer, 1777)
- Rhescyntis martii Perty, 1834
- Rhescyntis norax Druce, 1897
- Rhescyntis pomposa Draudt, 1930
- Rhescyntis pseudomartii Lemaire, 1976
- Rhescyntis reducta Becker & Camargo, 2001
- Rhescyntis septentrionalis Vazquez, 1966
