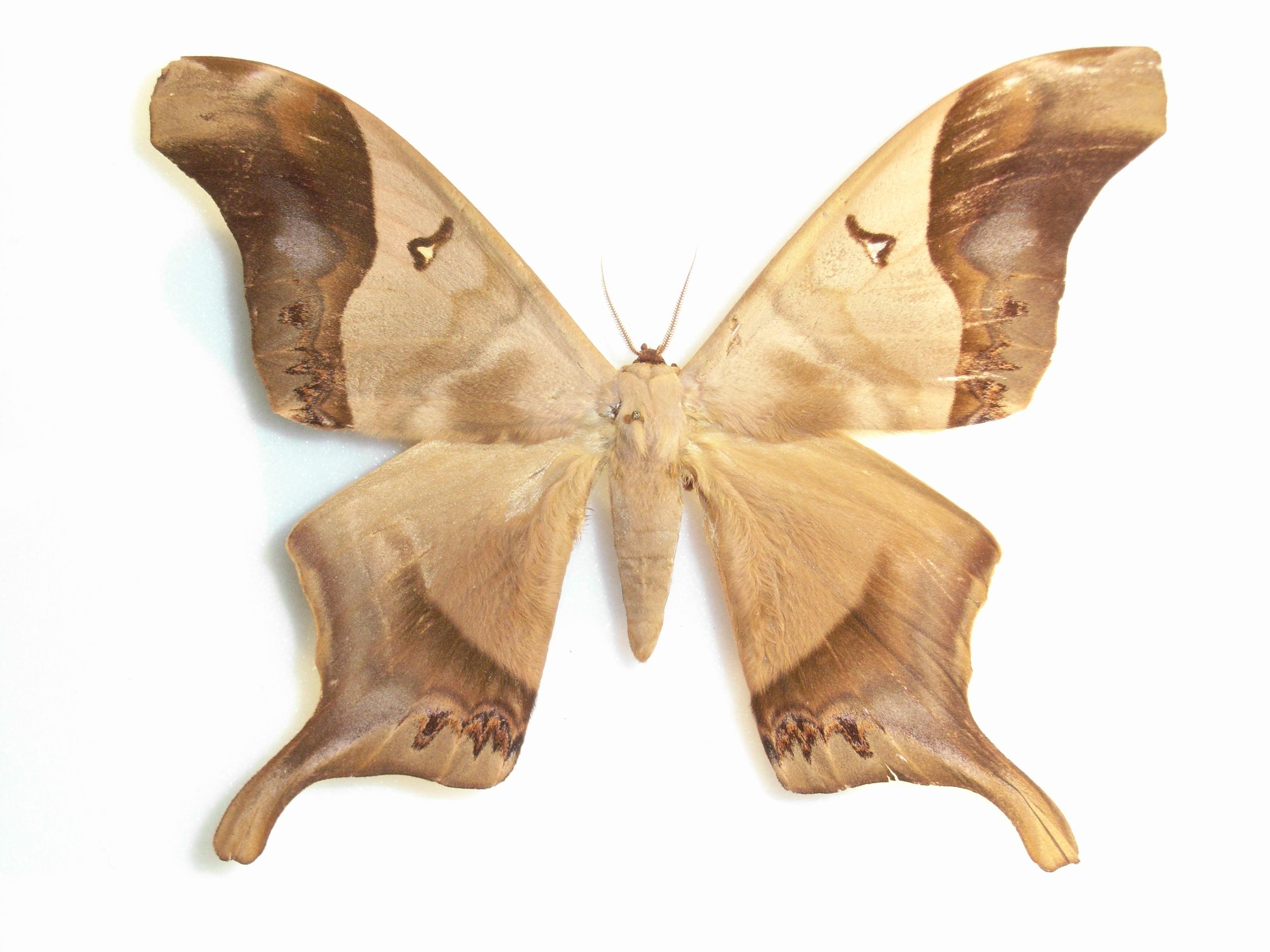

Scientific classification
- Domain: Eukaryota
- Kingdom: Animalia
- Phylum: Arthropoda
- Class: Insecta
- Order: Lepidoptera
- Family: Saturniidae
- Genus: Titaea
- Species: T. timur

Binomial name
- Titaea timur (Fassl, 1915)

= Titaea timur =

Species of moth

Titaea timur is a moth of the family Saturniidae. It is only known from Misahualli in Ecuador.
