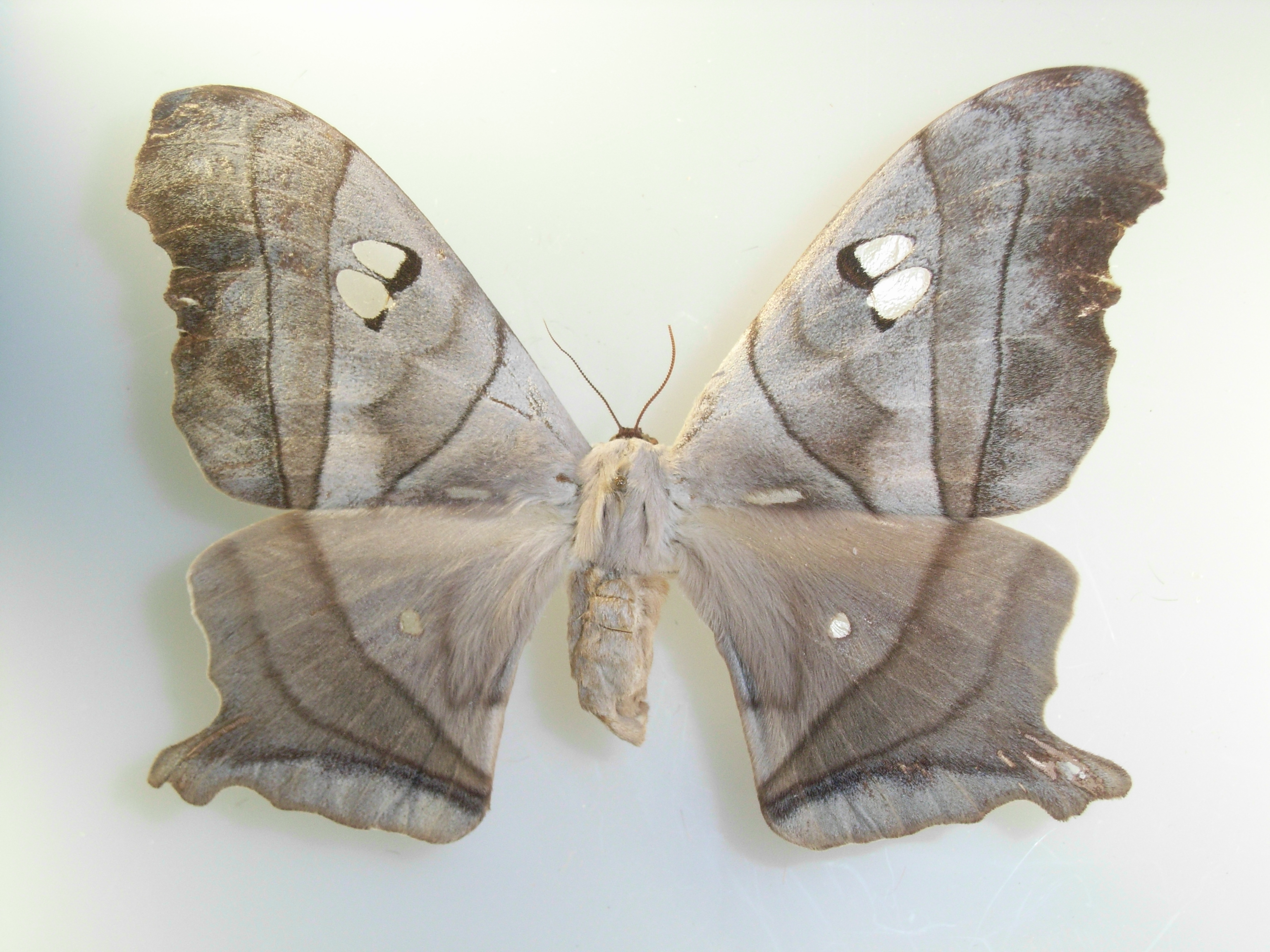

Scientific classification
- Domain: Eukaryota
- Kingdom: Animalia
- Phylum: Arthropoda
- Class: Insecta
- Order: Lepidoptera
- Family: Saturniidae
- Genus: Dysdaemonia
- Species: D. boreas

Binomial name
- Dysdaemonia boreas (Cramer, [1775])

Synonyms
- Phalaena boreas Cramer, [1775]

= Dysdaemonia boreas =

Species of moth

Dysdaemonia boreas is a moth of the family Saturniidae. It is found from Mexico to Guyanas.
