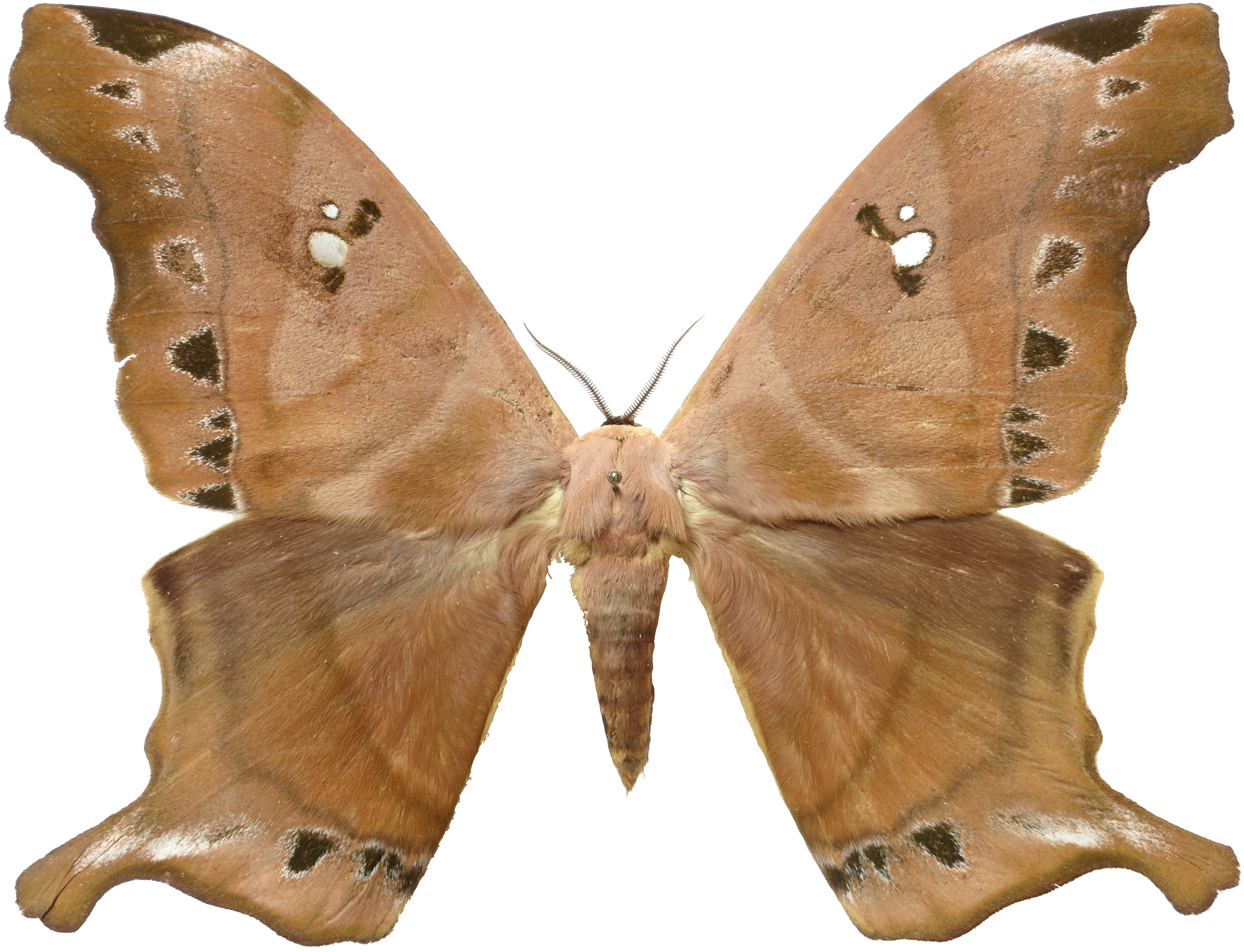
- Titaea tamerlan amazonensis

Scientific classification
- Domain: Eukaryota
- Kingdom: Animalia
- Phylum: Arthropoda
- Class: Insecta
- Order: Lepidoptera
- Family: Saturniidae
- Subfamily: Arsenurinae
- Genus: Titaea; Hübner, 1823

= Titaea =

Genus of moths

Titaea is a genus of moths in the family Saturniidae first described by Jacob Hübner in 1823. Its species’ ranges extend through Central America and the Northern parts of South America.

== Species ==
- Titaea lemoulti (Schaus, 1905)
- Titaea orsinome Hübner, 1823
- Titaea raveni Johnson & Michener, 1948
- Titaea tamerlan (Maassen, 1869)
- Titaea timur (Fassl, 1915)
