= Sarosa lutibasis =

Scientific classification
- Kingdom: Animalia
- Phylum: Arthropoda
- Class: Insecta
- Order: Lepidoptera
- Superfamily: Noctuoidea
- Family: Erebidae
- Subfamily: Arctiinae
- Genus: Sarosa
- Species: S. lutibasis

Binomial name
- Sarosa lutibasis Hampson, 1901

Species of moth

Sarosa lutibasis is a moth in the subfamily Arctiinae. It was described by George Hampson in 1901. It is found in Panama.
