= Sarosa ozora =

Scientific classification
- Domain: Eukaryota
- Kingdom: Animalia
- Phylum: Arthropoda
- Class: Insecta
- Order: Lepidoptera
- Superfamily: Noctuoidea
- Family: Erebidae
- Subfamily: Arctiinae
- Genus: Sarosa
- Species: S. ozora

Binomial name
- Sarosa ozora (H. Druce, 1883)

Synonyms
- Homeocera ozora H. Druce, 1883; Dasysphinx ozora (H. Druce, 1883)

Species of moth

Sarosa ozora is a moth of the subfamily Arctiinae. It was described by Herbert Druce in 1883. It is found in Colombia.
