= Sarosa pseudohelotes =

Scientific classification
- Domain: Eukaryota
- Kingdom: Animalia
- Phylum: Arthropoda
- Class: Insecta
- Order: Lepidoptera
- Superfamily: Noctuoidea
- Family: Erebidae
- Subfamily: Arctiinae
- Genus: Sarosa
- Species: S. pseudohelotes

Binomial name
- Sarosa pseudohelotes Rothschild, 1931

Species of moth

Sarosa pseudohelotes is a moth in the subfamily Arctiinae. It was described by Rothschild in 1931. It is found in Venezuela.

== Subspecies ==
- Sarosa pseudohelotes pseudohelotes
- Sarosa pseudohelotes intensior Rothschild, 1931 (Venezuela)
