= Sarosa notata =

Scientific classification
- Domain: Eukaryota
- Kingdom: Animalia
- Phylum: Arthropoda
- Class: Insecta
- Order: Lepidoptera
- Superfamily: Noctuoidea
- Family: Erebidae
- Subfamily: Arctiinae
- Genus: Sarosa
- Species: S. notata

Binomial name
- Sarosa notata (Butler, 1876)

Synonyms
- Ilipa notata Butler, 1876; Comosoma ufentina Druce, 1883

Species of moth

Sarosa notata is a moth in the subfamily Arctiinae. It was described by Arthur Gardiner Butler in 1876. It is found in Colombia and Bolivia.
