= Sarosa boenninghauseni =

Scientific classification
- Domain: Eukaryota
- Kingdom: Animalia
- Phylum: Arthropoda
- Class: Insecta
- Order: Lepidoptera
- Superfamily: Noctuoidea
- Family: Erebidae
- Subfamily: Arctiinae
- Genus: Sarosa
- Species: S. boenninghauseni

Binomial name
- Sarosa boenninghauseni Rothschild, 1911

Species of moth

Sarosa boenninghauseni is a moth in the subfamily Arctiinae. It was described by Walter Rothschild in 1911. It is found in Brazil (Rio de Janeiro).
