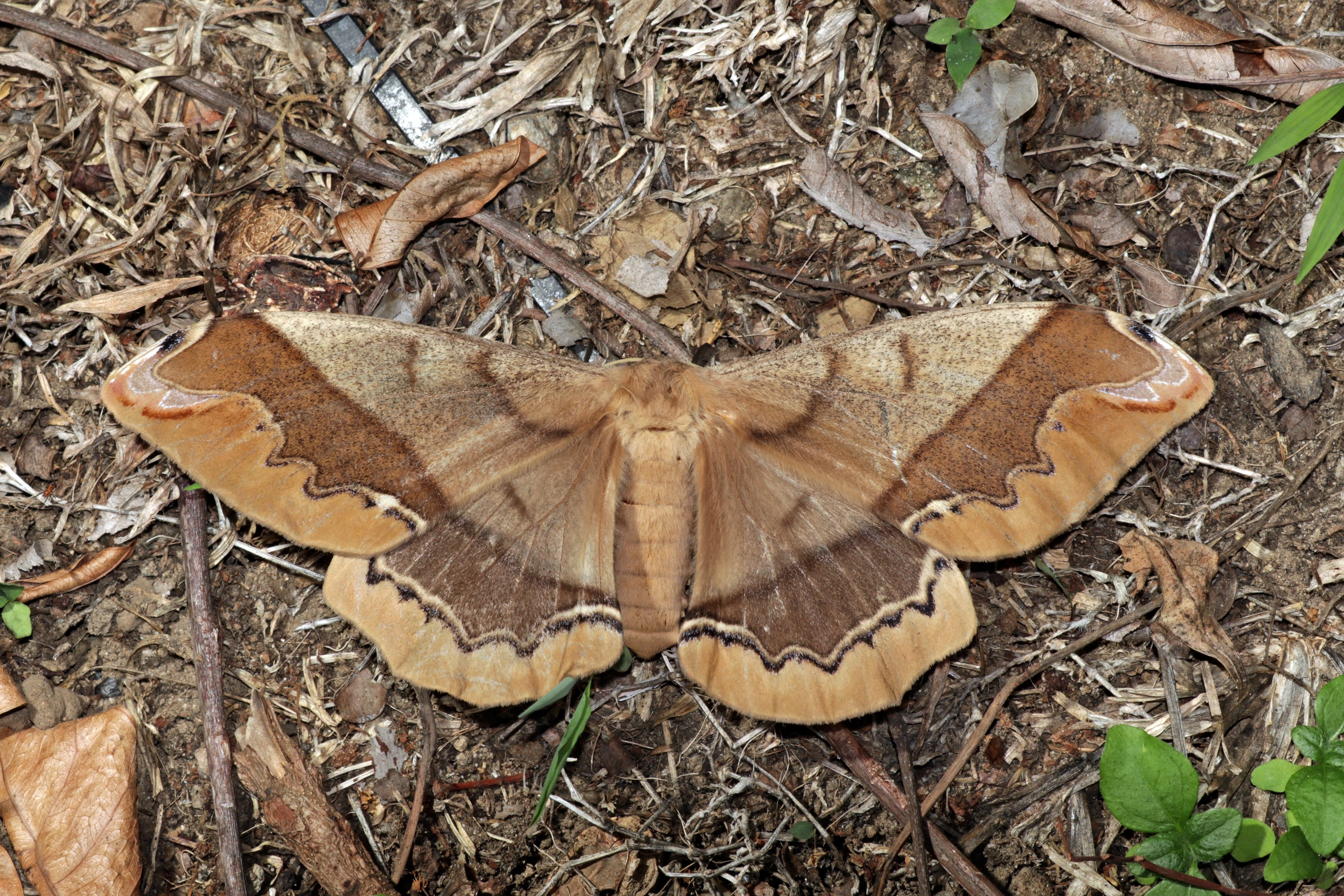
- A. armida

Scientific classification
- Kingdom: Animalia
- Phylum: Arthropoda
- Clade: Pancrustacea
- Class: Insecta
- Order: Lepidoptera
- Family: Saturniidae
- Subfamily: Arsenurinae
- Genus: Arsenura; Duncan [& Westwood], 1841

Species
- See text

Synonyms
- Aricia Herrich-Schäffer, [1853]

= Arsenura =

Genus of moths

Arsenura is a genus of moths in the family Saturniidae. The genus was erected by James Duncan and John O. Westwood in 1841.

== Species ==
The genus includes the following species:

- Arsenura albopicta Jordan, 1922
- Arsenura alcmene Draudt, 1930
- Arsenura altocymonia Brechlin & Meister, 2010
- Arsenura amacymonia Brechlin & Meister, 2011
- Arsenura angulata Bouvier, 1924
- Arsenura arcaei Druce, 1886
- Arsenura archianassa Draudt, 1930
- Arsenura arianae Brechlin & Meister, 2010
- Arsenura armida (Cramer, 1779)
- Arsenura aspasia (Herrich-Schaeffer, 1853)
- Arsenura aurantiaca Lemaire, 1976
- Arsenura batesii (R. Felder & Rogenhofer, 1874)
- Arsenura beebei (Fleming, 1945)
- Arsenura biundulata Schaus, 1906
- Arsenura ciocolatina Draudt, 1930
- Arsenura columbiana Rothschild, 1907
- Arsenura crenulata Schaus, 1921
- Arsenura cymonia (W. Rothschild, 1907)
- Arsenura delormei Bouvier, 1929
- Arsenura drucei Schaus, 1906
- Arsenura fuscata Brechlin & Meister, 2010
- Arsenura hercules Walker, 1855
- Arsenura jennettae Wolfe, Conlan & Kelly, 2000
- Arsenura kaechi Brechlin & Meister, 2010
- Arsenura meander (Walker, 1855)
- Arsenura mestiza Draudt, 1940
- Arsenura mossi Jordan, 1922
- Arsenura niepelti Schüssler, 1930
- Arsenura orbignyana (Guerin-Meneville, 1844)
- Arsenura oweni Schaus, 1921
- Arsenura pandora (Klug, 1836)
- Arsenura paranensis Schüssler, 1930
- Arsenura paraorbygnyana Brechlin & Meister, 2010
- Arsenura peggyae Brechlin & Meister, 2013
- Arsenura pelias Jordan, 1911
- Arsenura polyodonta (Jordan, 1911)
- Arsenura ponderosa W. Rothschild, 1895
- Arsenura rebeli Gschwander, 1920
- Arsenura sylla (Cramer, 1779)
- Arsenura thomsoni Schaus, 1906
- Arsenura xanthopus (Walker, 1855)
- Arsenura yungascymonia Brechlin & Meister, 2010
