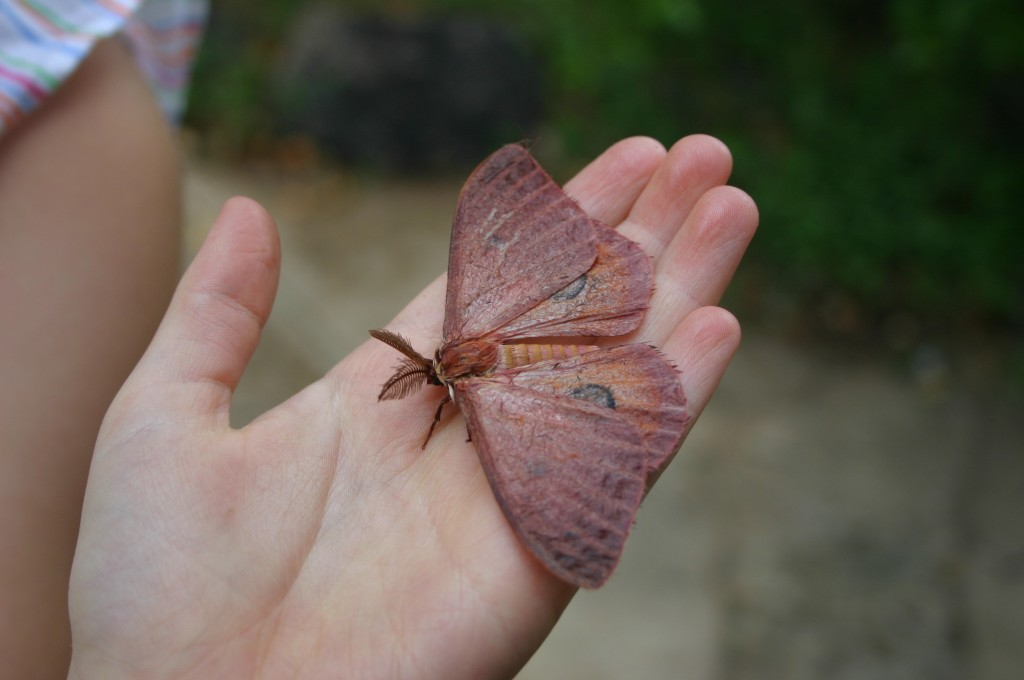
- Rohaniella pygmaea

Scientific classification
- Kingdom: Animalia
- Phylum: Arthropoda
- Class: Insecta
- Order: Lepidoptera
- Family: Saturniidae
- Tribe: Bunaeini
- Genus: Rohaniella; Bouvier, 1927

= Rohaniella =

Genus of moths

Rohaniella is a genus of moths in the family Saturniidae. The genus was erected by Eugène Louis Bouvier in 1927.

== Species ==
- Rohaniella guineensis Bouvier, 1927
- Rohaniella pygmaea (Maassen & Weymer, 1885)
