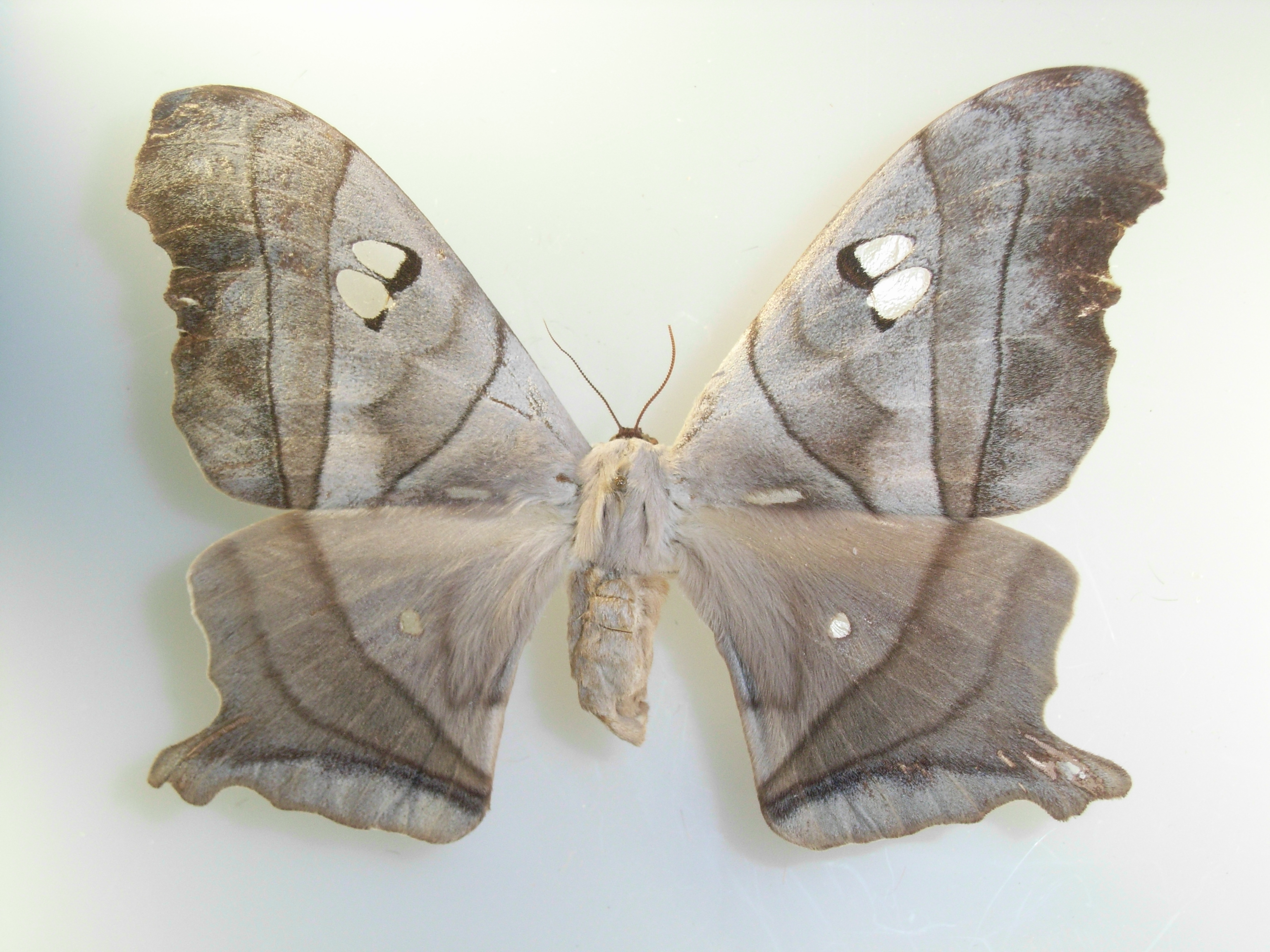
- Dysdaemonia boreas (Cramer, [1775]) Ex coll. Felix Stumpe

Scientific classification
- Domain: Eukaryota
- Kingdom: Animalia
- Phylum: Arthropoda
- Class: Insecta
- Order: Lepidoptera
- Family: Saturniidae
- Subfamily: Arsenurinae
- Genus: Dysdaemonia; Hübner, 1819

= Dysdaemonia =

Genus of moths

Dysdaemonia is a genus of moths in the family Saturniidae first described by Jacob Hübner in 1819.

== Species ==
- Dysdaemonia angustata Breyer, 1933
- Dysdaemonia aristor Kirby, 1892
- Dysdaemonia auster Felder, 1874
- Dysdaemonia australoboreas Brechlin & Meister, 2009
- Dysdaemonia boreas (Cramer, 1775)
- Dysdaemonia brasiliensis W. Rothschild, 1907
- Dysdaemonia concisa Becker & Camargo, 2001
- Dysdaemonia cortesi Giacomelli, 1925
- Dysdaemonia fasciata John, 1928
- Dysdaemonia fosteri W. Rothschild, 1906
- Dysdaemonia fusca Breyer, 1933
- Dysdaemonia grisea Breyer, 1933
- Dysdaemonia jordani Giacomelli, 1925
- Dysdaemonia undosa Breyer, 1933
- Dysdaemonia undulensis Brechlin & Meister, 2009
- Dysdaemonia viridis John, 1928
