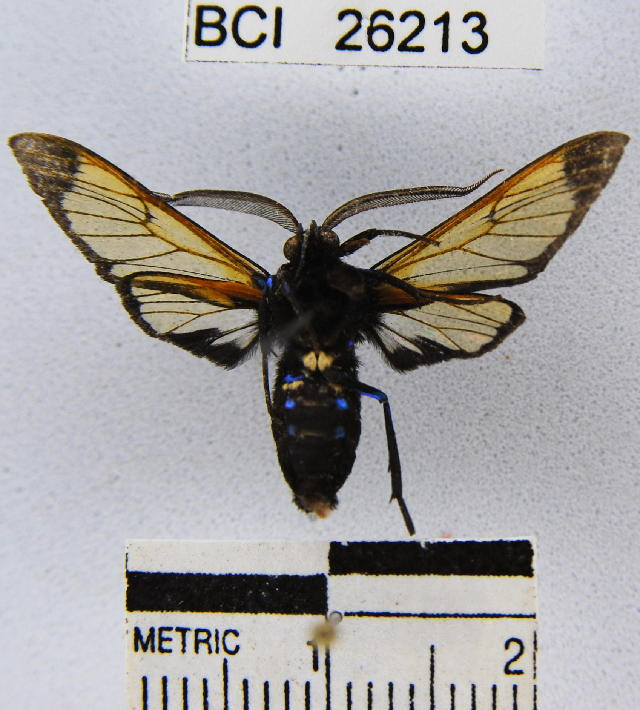
- Sarosa mora

Scientific classification
- Kingdom: Animalia
- Phylum: Arthropoda
- Class: Insecta
- Order: Lepidoptera
- Superfamily: Noctuoidea
- Family: Erebidae
- Subfamily: Arctiinae
- Genus: Sarosa; Walker, 1854

= Sarosa =

Genus of moths

Sarosa is a genus of moths in the subfamily Arctiinae. The genus was erected by Francis Walker in 1854.

== Species ==
- Sarosa acutior (Felder, 1874)
- Sarosa albraamea Schaus, 1924
- Sarosa annotata Dognin, 1914
- Sarosa atritorna Dognin, 1912
- Sarosa boenninghauseni Rothschild, 1911
- Sarosa connotata Hampson, 1901
- Sarosa epona Dognin, 1902
- Sarosa flavicostalis Rothschild, 1911
- Sarosa ignicornis Hampson, 1914
- Sarosa klagesi Rothschild, 1911
- Sarosa leuce (Maassen, 1890)
- Sarosa lutibasis Hampson, 1901
- Sarosa mora Schaus, 1911
- Sarosa notata (Butler, 1876)
- Sarosa ozora (H. Druce, 1883)
- Sarosa pompilina Butler, 1876
- Sarosa pseudohelotes Rothschild, 1931
- Sarosa sesiiformis (Walker, 1854)
- Sarosa xanthobasis H. Druce, 1898
