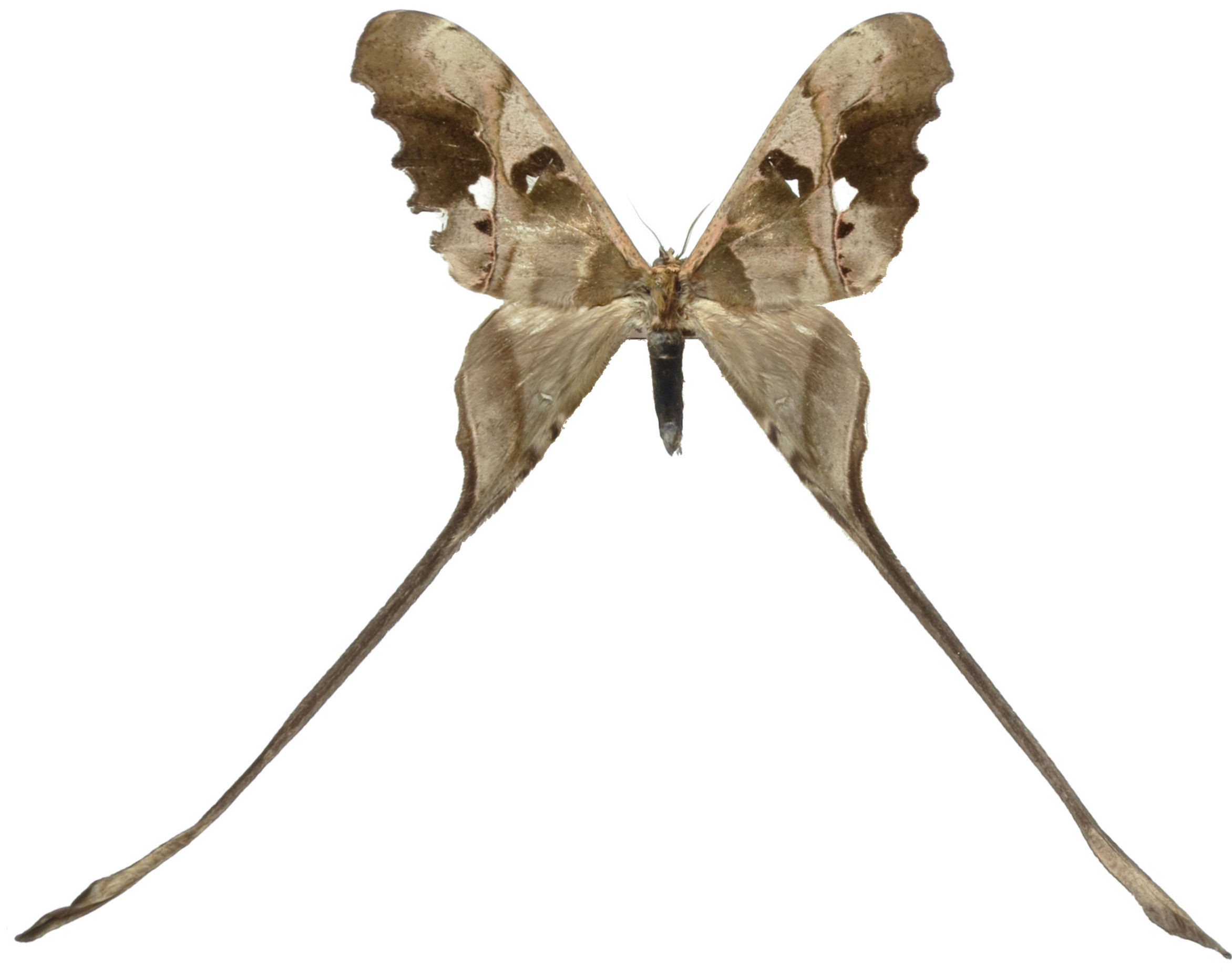
- Copiopteryx jehovah

Scientific classification
- Kingdom: Animalia
- Phylum: Arthropoda
- Class: Insecta
- Order: Lepidoptera
- Family: Saturniidae
- Subfamily: Arsenurinae
- Genus: Copiopteryx; Duncan [& Westwood], 1841

= Copiopteryx =

Genus of moths

Copiopteryx is a genus of moths in the family Saturniidae first described by James Duncan and John O. Westwood in 1841.

== Species ==
The genus includes the following species:

- Copiopteryx adaheli Draudt, 1930
- Copiopteryx andensis Lemaire, 1974
- Copiopteryx banghaasi Draudt, 1930
- Copiopteryx biedermanni Kotzsch, 1930
- Copiopteryx cleopatra Girard, 1882
- Copiopteryx derceto (Maassen, 1872)
- Copiopteryx imperialis Girard, 1882
- Copiopteryx inversa Giacomelli, 1911
- Copiopteryx jehovah (Strecker, 1874)
- Copiopteryx montei Gagarin, 1933
- Copiopteryx phippsi Schaus, 1932
- Copiopteryx phoenix Deyrolle, 1868
- Copiopteryx semiramis (Cramer, 1775)
- Copiopteryx sonthonnaxi Em. Andre, 1905
- Copiopteryx steindachneri Fassl, 1917
- Copiopteryx travassosi May, 1933
- Copiopteryx virgo Zikan, 1929
