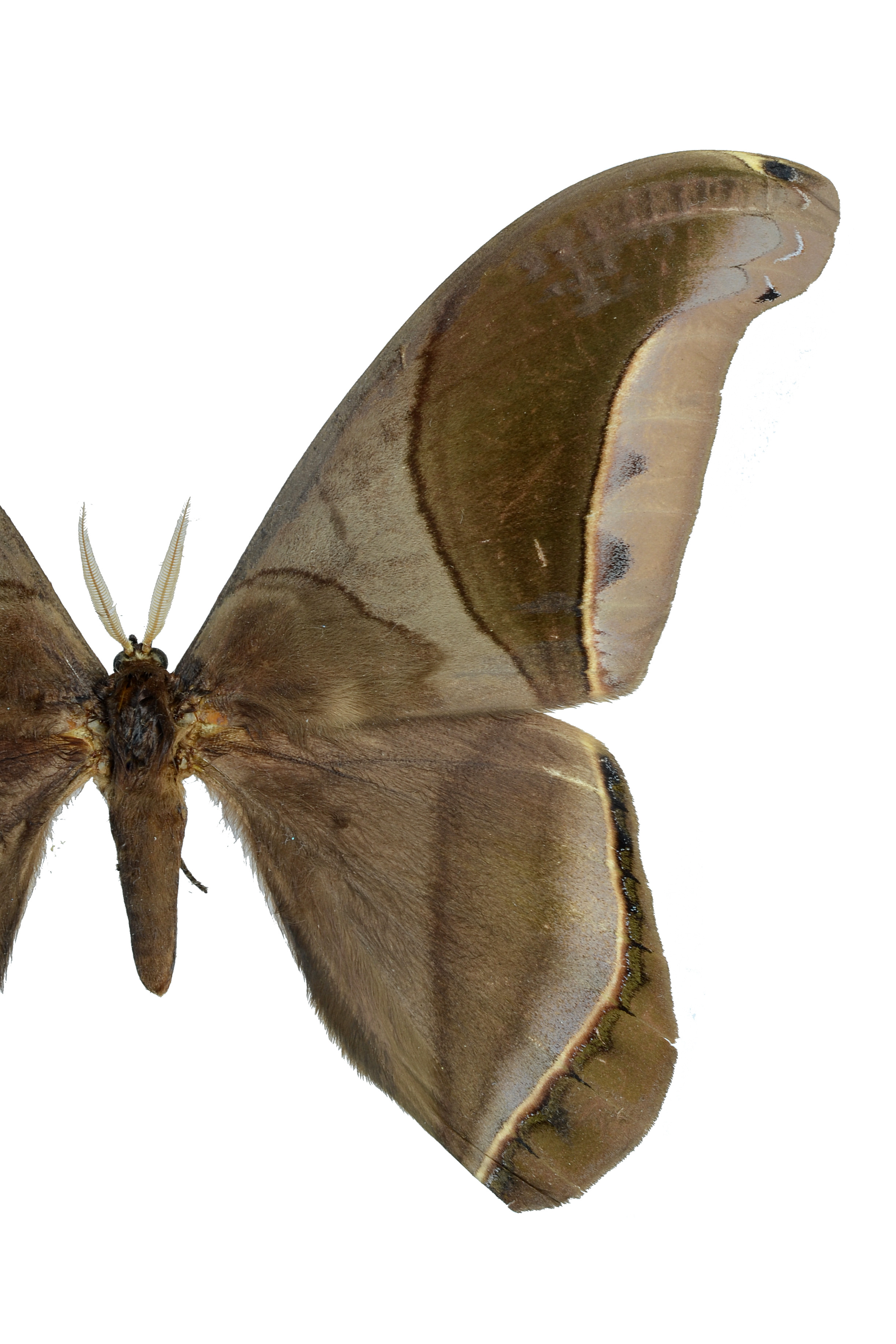
- Dorsal view
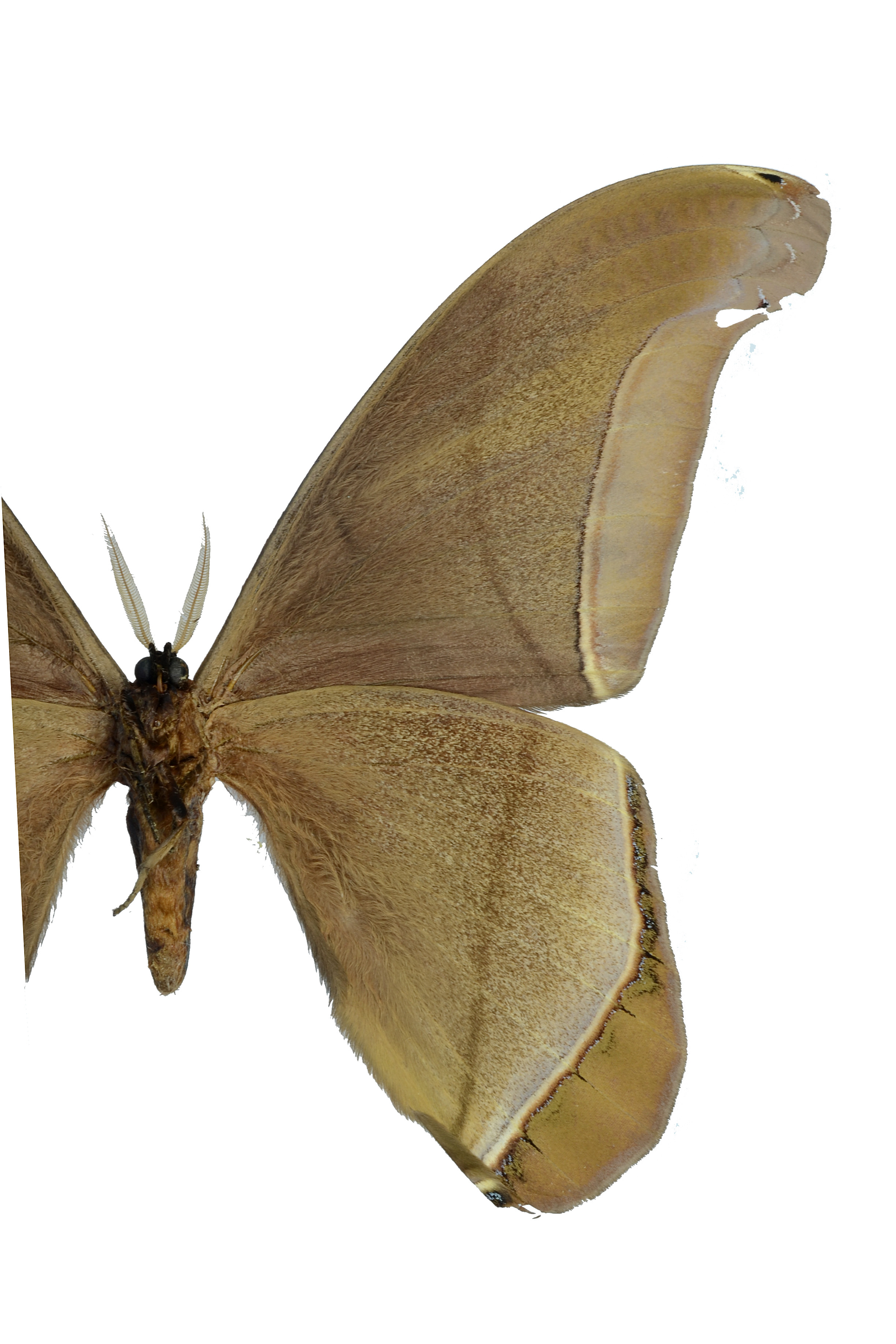
- Ventral view

Scientific classification
- Kingdom: Animalia
- Phylum: Arthropoda
- Class: Insecta
- Order: Lepidoptera
- Family: Saturniidae
- Genus: Rhescyntis
- Species: R. hippodamia

Binomial name
- Rhescyntis hippodamia (Cramer, 1777)

Synonyms
- Phalaena hippodamia Cramer, [1777]

= Rhescyntis hippodamia =

Species of moth

Rhescyntis hippodamia is a species of moth in the family Saturniidae first described by Pieter Cramer in 1777. It is found from Mexico to Brazil.

The wingspan is 135–150 mm.

== Subspecies ==
- Rhescyntis hippodamia hippodamia (Ecuador)
- Rhescyntis hippodamia norax Druce, 1879 (Mexico)
- Rhescyntis hippodamia colombiana Bouvier, 1927 (Ecuador)
