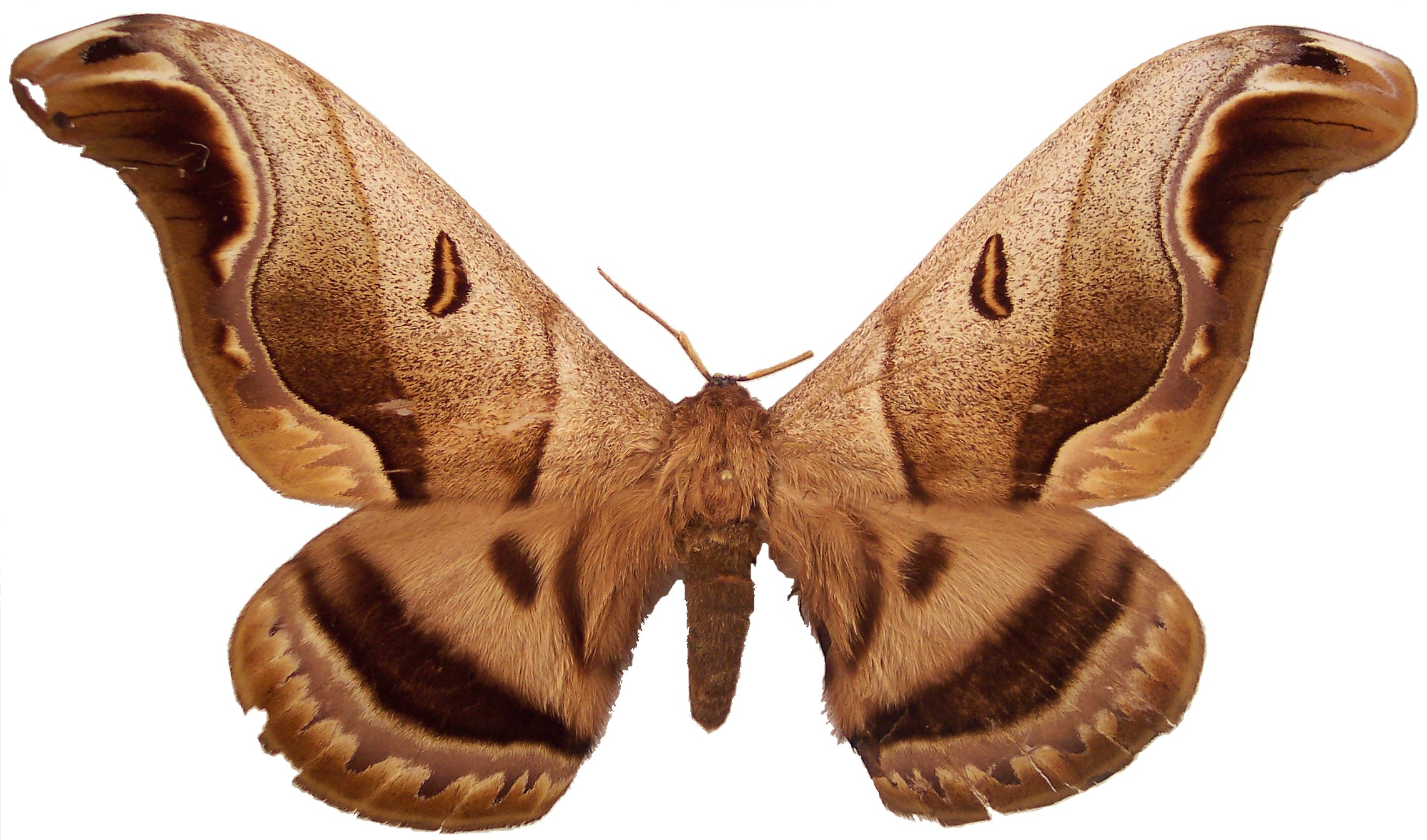
- Caio romulus

Scientific classification
- Kingdom: Animalia
- Phylum: Arthropoda
- Class: Insecta
- Order: Lepidoptera
- Family: Saturniidae
- Subfamily: Arsenurinae
- Genus: Caio; Travassos & Noronha, 1968

= Caio (moth) =

Genus of moths

Caio is a genus of moths in the family Saturniidae. The genus was described by Travassos and Noronha in 1968.

== Species ==
- Caio championi (Druce, 1886)
- Caio chiapasiana Brechlin & Meister, 2010
- Caio harrietae (Forbes, 1944)
- Caio hidalgensis Brechlin & Meister, 2010
- Caio richardsoni (Druce, 1890)
- Caio romulus (Maassen, 1869)
- Caio undilinea (Schaus, 1921)
- Caio witti Brechlin & Meister, 2010
