= Sarosa sesiiformis =

Scientific classification
- Kingdom: Animalia
- Phylum: Arthropoda
- Class: Insecta
- Order: Lepidoptera
- Superfamily: Noctuoidea
- Family: Erebidae
- Subfamily: Arctiinae
- Genus: Sarosa
- Species: S. sesiiformis

Binomial name
- Sarosa sesiiformis (Walker, 1854)

Synonyms
- Glaucopis sesiiformis Walker, 1854

Species of moth

Sarosa sesiiformis is a moth in the subfamily Arctiinae. It was described by Francis Walker in 1854. It is found in Venezuela.
