= Sarosa xanthobasis =

Scientific classification
- Domain: Eukaryota
- Kingdom: Animalia
- Phylum: Arthropoda
- Class: Insecta
- Order: Lepidoptera
- Superfamily: Noctuoidea
- Family: Erebidae
- Subfamily: Arctiinae
- Genus: Sarosa
- Species: S. xanthobasis

Binomial name
- Sarosa xanthobasis H. Druce, 1898

Species of moth

Sarosa xanthobasis is a moth in the subfamily Arctiinae. It was described by Herbert Druce in 1898. It is found in Ecuador.
