= Almeidaia =

Scientific classification
- Kingdom: Animalia
- Phylum: Arthropoda
- Class: Insecta
- Order: Lepidoptera
- Family: Saturniidae
- Subfamily: Arsenurinae
- Genus: Almeidaia; Travassos, 1937

Genus of moths

Almeidaia is a genus of moths in the family Saturniidae first described by Travassos in 1937.

== Species ==
- Almeidaia aidae O. Mielke & Casagrande, 1981
- Almeidaia romualdoi Travassos, 1937
