= Sarosa epona =

Scientific classification
- Domain: Eukaryota
- Kingdom: Animalia
- Phylum: Arthropoda
- Class: Insecta
- Order: Lepidoptera
- Superfamily: Noctuoidea
- Family: Erebidae
- Subfamily: Arctiinae
- Genus: Sarosa
- Species: S. epona

Binomial name
- Sarosa epona Dognin, 1902

Species of moth

Sarosa epona is a moth in the subfamily Arctiinae. It was described by Paul Dognin in 1902. It is found in Venezuela.
