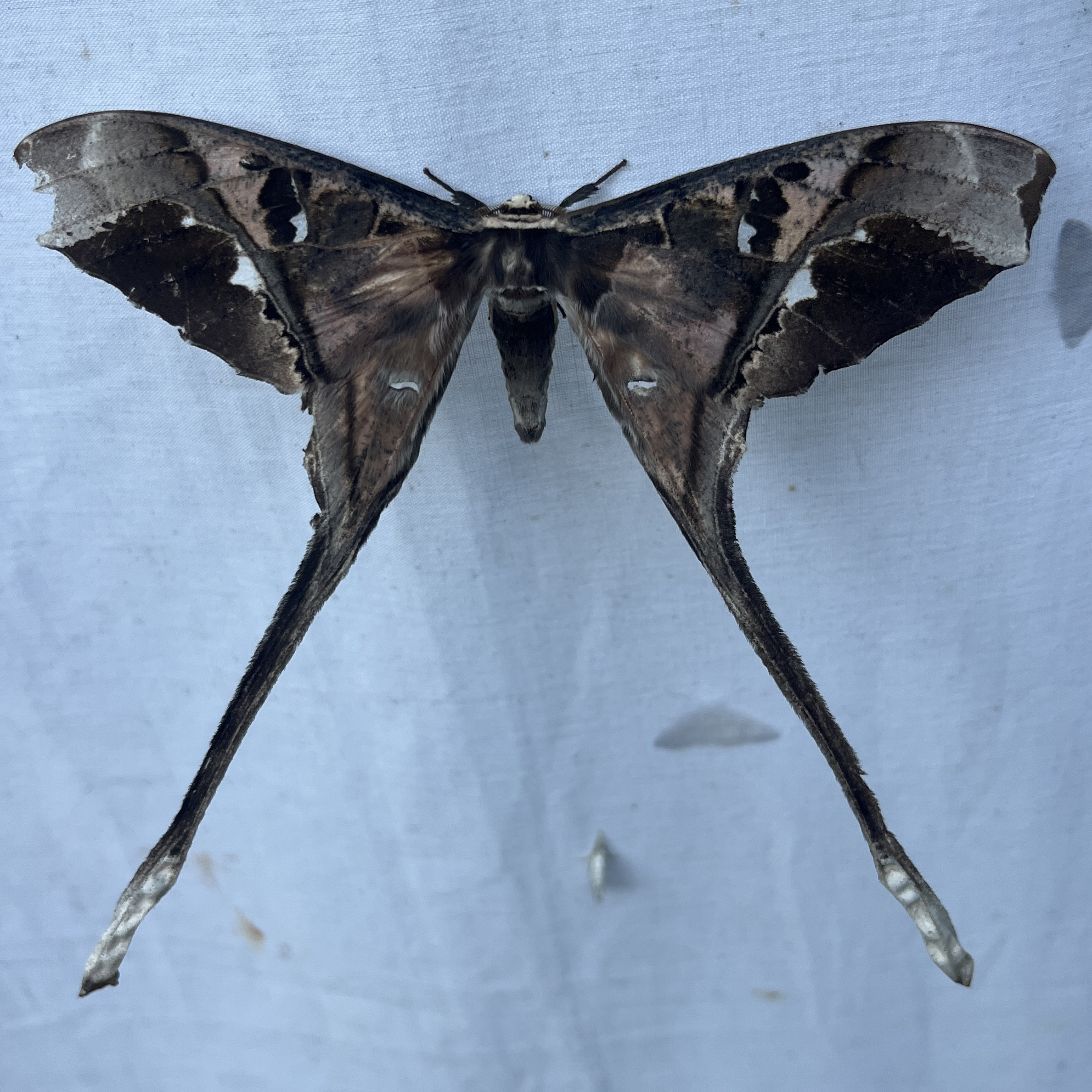
- Found on a light trap north of Manaus, Brazil

Scientific classification
- Kingdom: Animalia
- Phylum: Arthropoda
- Clade: Pancrustacea
- Class: Insecta
- Order: Lepidoptera
- Family: Saturniidae
- Genus: Copiopteryx
- Species: C. semiramis

Binomial name
- Copiopteryx semiramis Cramer, 1775

= Copiopteryx semiramis =

Species of insect

Copiopteryx semiramis is a large silk moth in the subfamily Saturniinae. It is found primarily in the rainforests of South America.

It has a typical wingspan of 10 centimeters.
