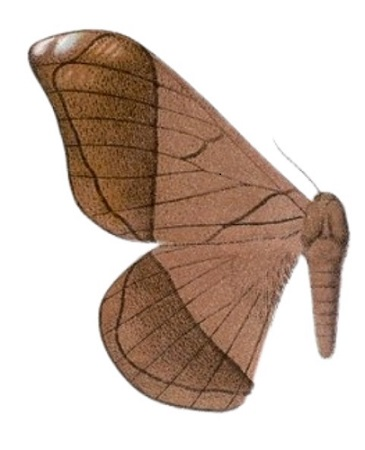
- Illustration of Grammopelta

Scientific classification
- Kingdom: Animalia
- Phylum: Arthropoda
- Class: Insecta
- Order: Lepidoptera
- Family: Saturniidae
- Subfamily: Arsenurinae
- Genus: Grammopelta; Rothschild, 1907

= Grammopelta =

Genus of moths

Grammopelta is a genus of moths in the family Saturniidae first described by Rothschild in 1907.

== Species ==
- ?Grammopelta cervina Rothschild, 1907
- Grammopelta lineata (Schaus, 1906)
