= Sarosa acutior =

Scientific classification
- Kingdom: Animalia
- Phylum: Arthropoda
- Class: Insecta
- Order: Lepidoptera
- Superfamily: Noctuoidea
- Family: Erebidae
- Subfamily: Arctiinae
- Genus: Sarosa
- Species: S. acutior

Binomial name
- Sarosa acutior (Felder, 1874)

Synonyms
- Isanthrene acutior Felder, 1874

Species of moth

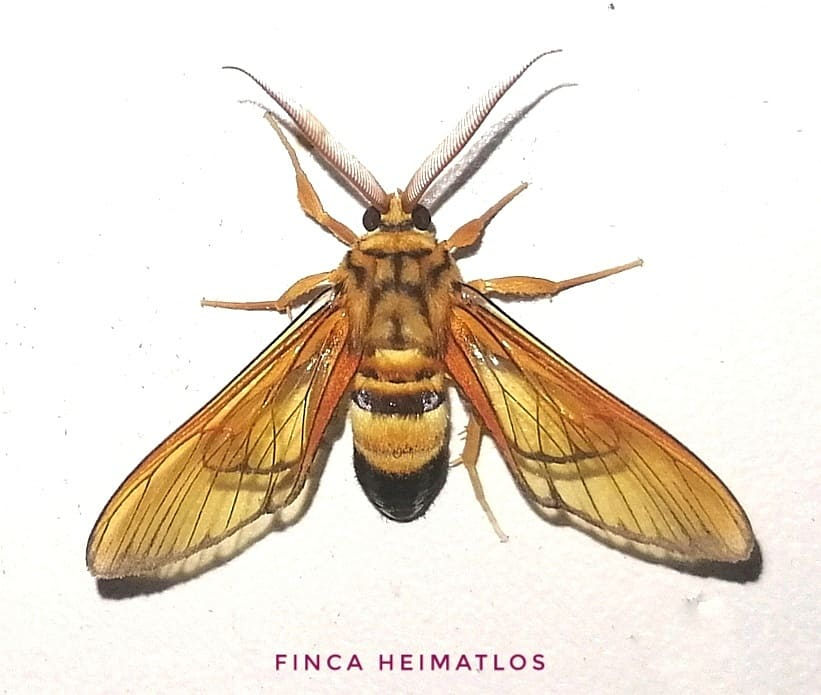
Sarosa Acutior

https://commons.wikimedia.org/wiki/File:Sarosa_acutior.jpg

Sarosa acutior is a moth in the subfamily Arctiinae. It was described by Felder in 1874. It is found in Ecuador and the Amazon region.
