= Sarosa pompilina =

Scientific classification
- Domain: Eukaryota
- Kingdom: Animalia
- Phylum: Arthropoda
- Class: Insecta
- Order: Lepidoptera
- Superfamily: Noctuoidea
- Family: Erebidae
- Subfamily: Arctiinae
- Genus: Sarosa
- Species: S. pompilina

Binomial name
- Sarosa pompilina Butler, 1876

Species of moth

Sarosa pompilina is a moth in the subfamily Arctiinae. It was described by Arthur Gardiner Butler in 1876. It is found in Panama, Ecuador and the Brazilian state of Espírito Santo.
