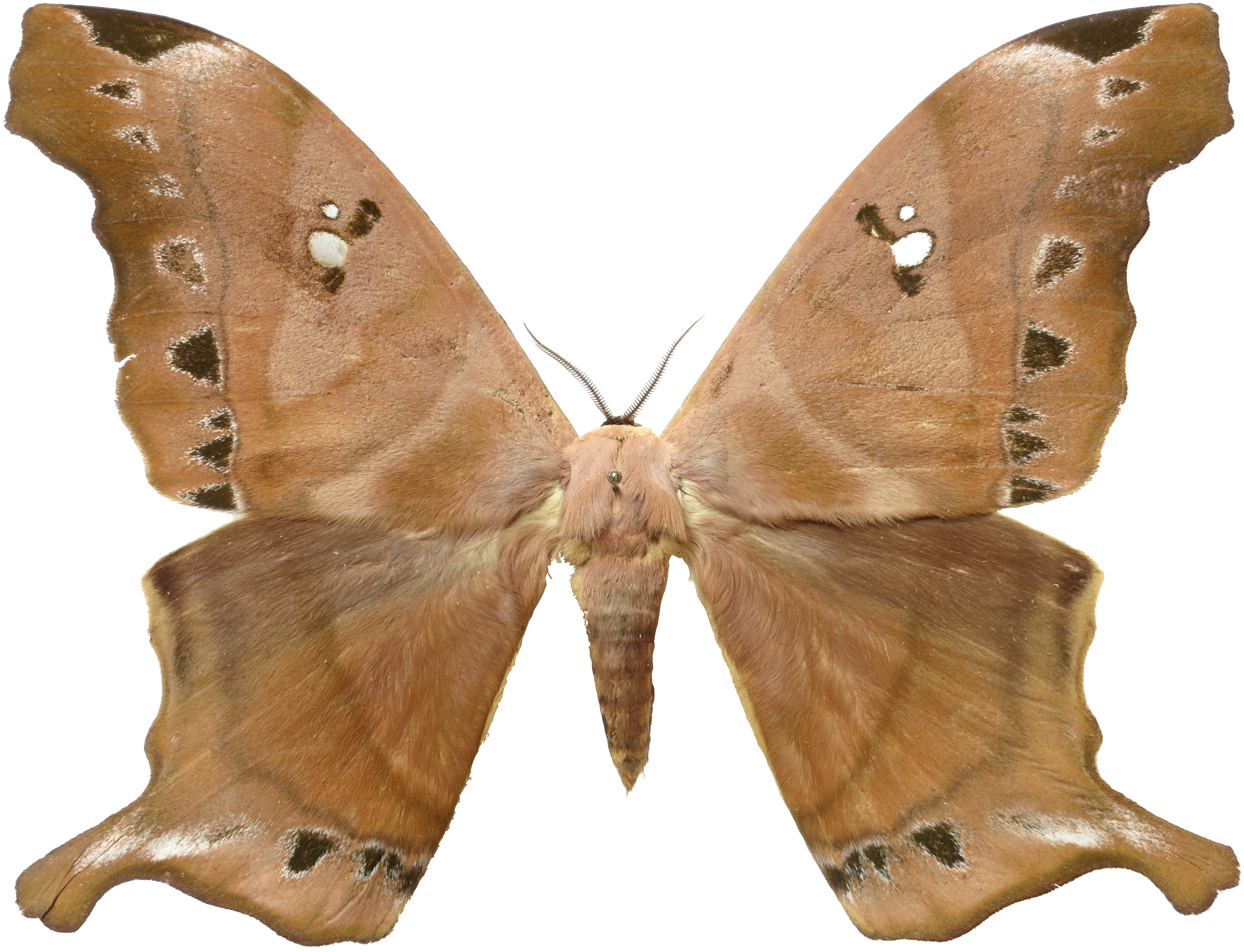
- Titaea tamerlan

Scientific classification
- Domain: Eukaryota
- Kingdom: Animalia
- Phylum: Arthropoda
- Class: Insecta
- Order: Lepidoptera
- Family: Saturniidae
- Subfamily: Arsenurinae

Genera
- See text.

= Arsenurinae =

Subfamily of moths

Arsenurinae is a subfamily of the family Saturniidae.

This subfamily contains the following genera:

- Almeidaia Travassos, 1937
- Arsenura Duncan [& Westwood], 1841
- Caio Travassos & Noronha, 1968
- Copiopteryx Duncan [& Westwood], 1841
- Dysdaemonia Hübner, 1819
- Grammopelta Rothschild, 1907
- Loxolomia Maassen, 1869
- Paradaemonia Bouvier, 1925
- Rhescyntis Hübner, 1819
- Titaea Hübner, 1823
