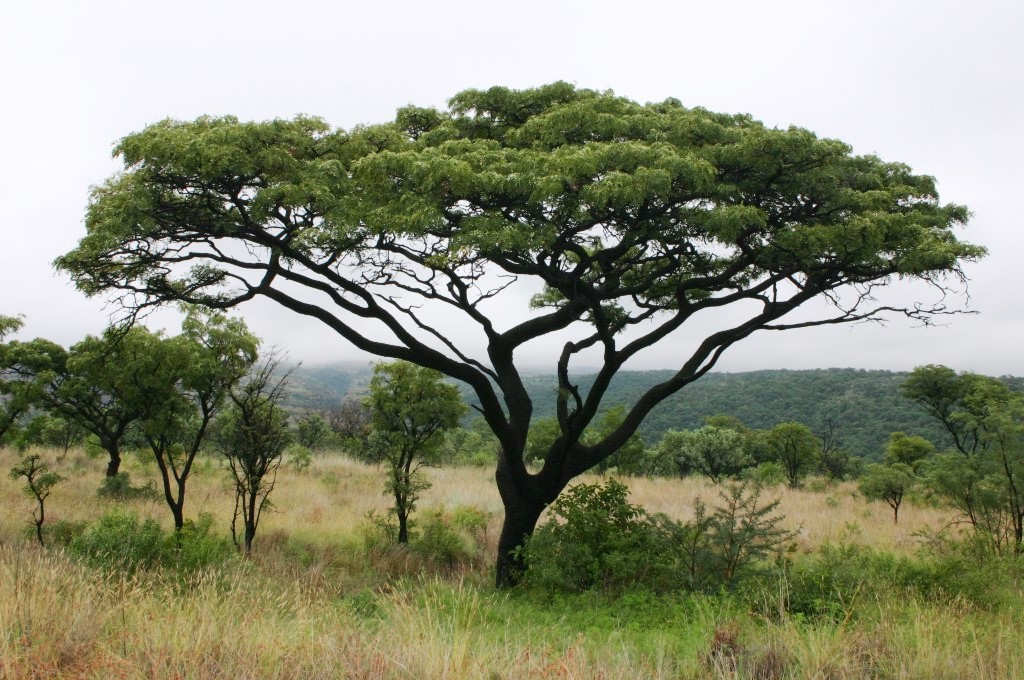

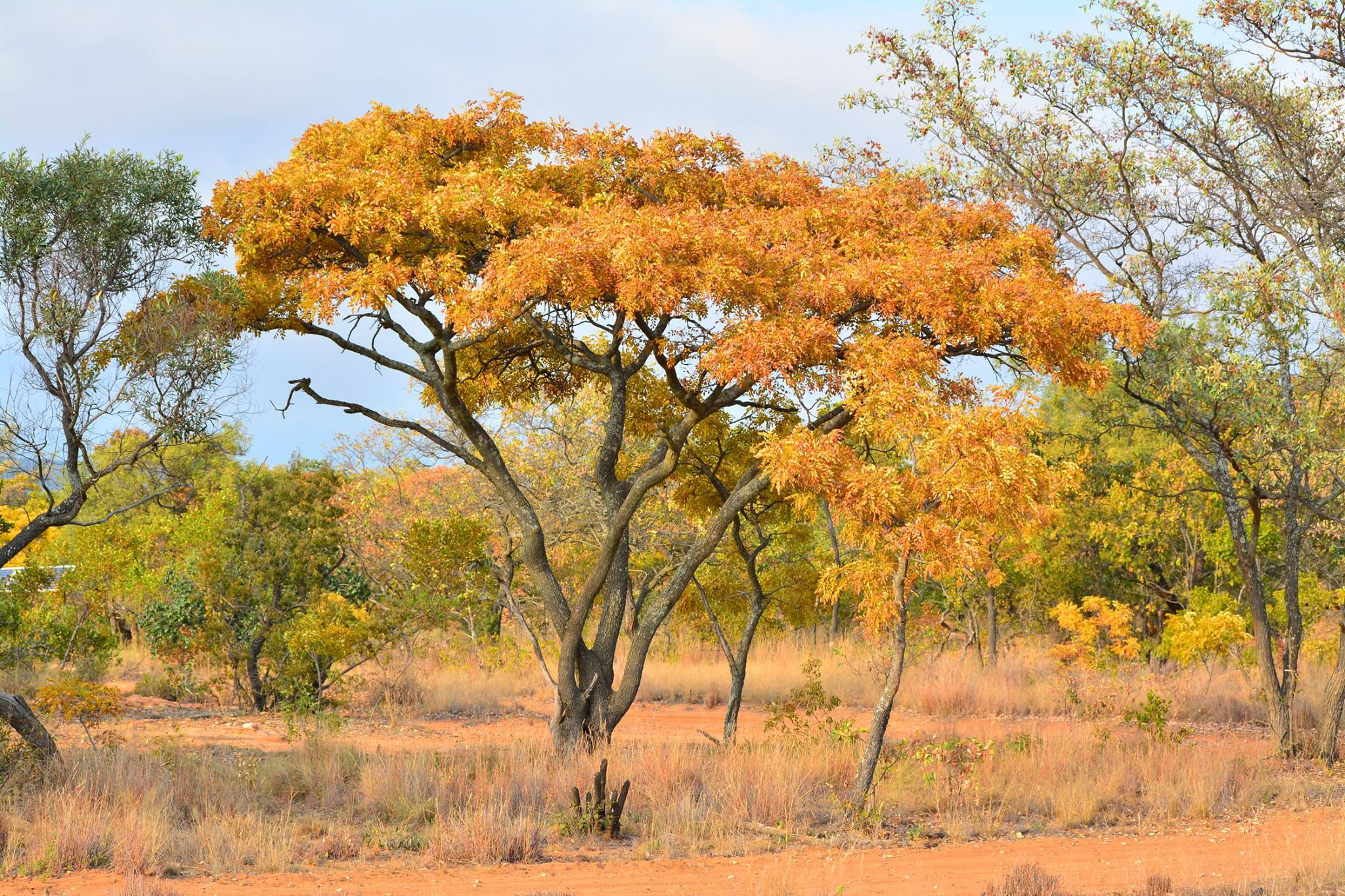
- Summer and autumn foliage

Scientific classification
- Kingdom: Plantae
- Clade: Tracheophytes
- Clade: Angiosperms
- Clade: Eudicots
- Clade: Rosids
- Order: Fabales
- Family: Fabaceae
- Subfamily: Caesalpinioideae
- (unranked): Dimorphandra Group A
- Genus: Burkea; Benth. (1843)
- Species: B. africana

Binomial name
- Burkea africana Hook. (1843)

Synonyms
- Burkea africana var. andongensis Oliv. (1871); Burkea africana var. cordata Welw. ex Oliv. (1871); Burkea caperangau Baill. (1870)

= Burkea africana =

Wild syringa

Species of legume

Burkea africana, the wild syringa (Bambara: siri), is a deciduous, medium-sized, spreading, flat-topped tree which grows in the woodlands and savannas of sub-Saharan Africa. It is the sole species in genus Burkea, which belongs to the subfamily Caesalpinioideae of the family Fabaceae.

The genus was named in honour of Joseph Burke, the botanist and collector.

== Description ==
Burkea africana is a tree growing from 4 to 20 meters high. Leaves are bipinnately compound, silvery pubescent or glabrescent. Flowers are creamy white, fragrant and in pendulous racemes of up to 300 mm in length. The bark is toxic, rich in alkaloids and tannins and used for tanning leather. Pulverised bark is thrown into water to paralyse fish.

== Range and habitat ==
Burkea africana is widespread in sub-Saharan Africa, from Senegal to Sudan and South Africa. It is found in Chad, Sudan, Tanzania, Uganda, Cameroon, the Central African Republic, Zaire, Benin, Burkina Faso, Ivory Coast, Ghana, Guinea, Mali, Niger, Nigeria, Senegal, Togo, Angola, Malawi, Mozambique, Zambia, Zimbabwe, Botswana, Namibia and South Africa in the Transvaal region.

It is typically found in deciduous woodland and savanna from 270 to 1300 meters elevation. The species is generally absent from humid tropical rain forests.

== Ecology ==
The foliage is browsed by the larvae of two Saturniidae moths, Rohaniella pygmaea and Imbrasia forda. Cape Porcupines are particularly fond of the bark of Burkea Africana. By removing the bark, they make the trees more susceptible to fire as well as reducing the number of trees reaching maturity.

== Uses ==
If cut from the heartwood, it produces durable, insect-resistant timber with a moderately fine, wavy grain which is dark brown to reddish brown, and is used for parquet flooring and fine cabinet and furniture work.

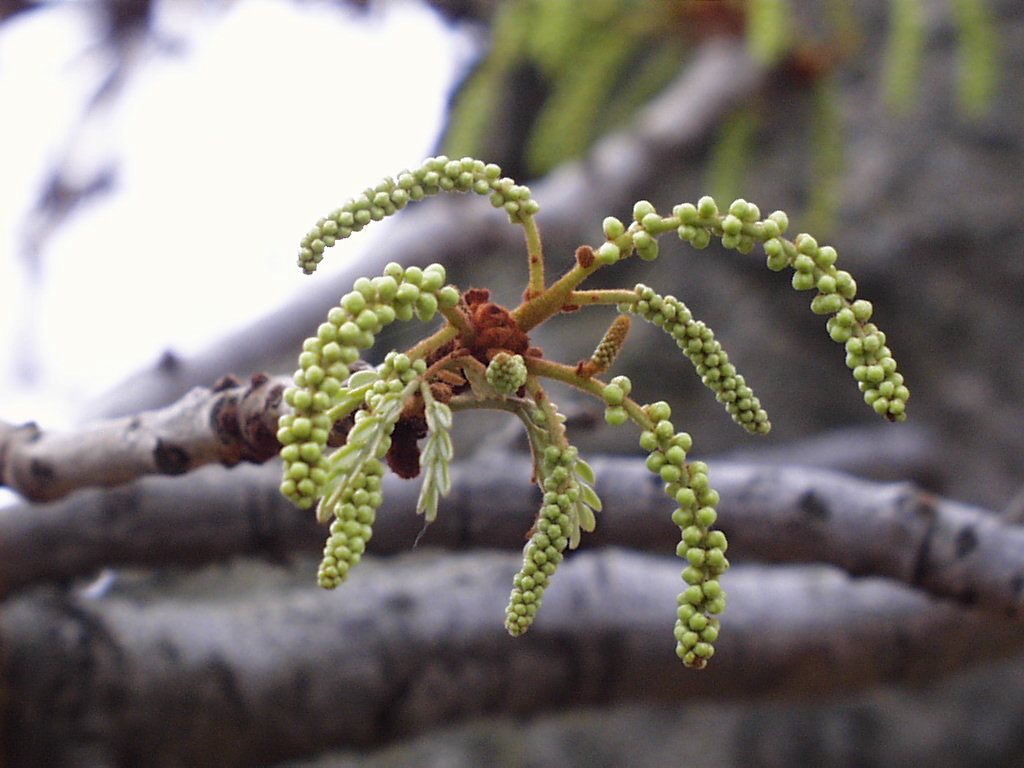
Flower buds

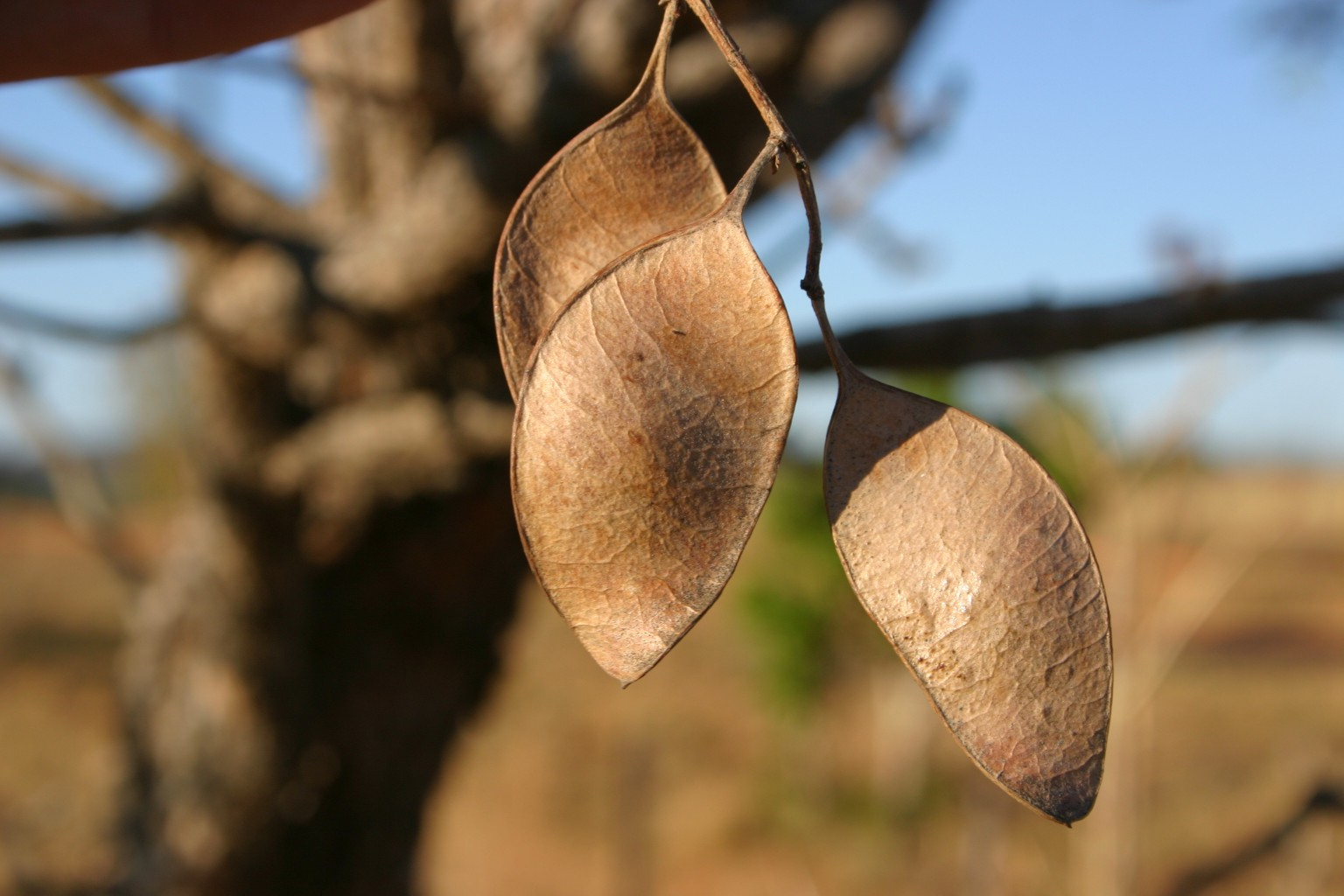
Seed pods

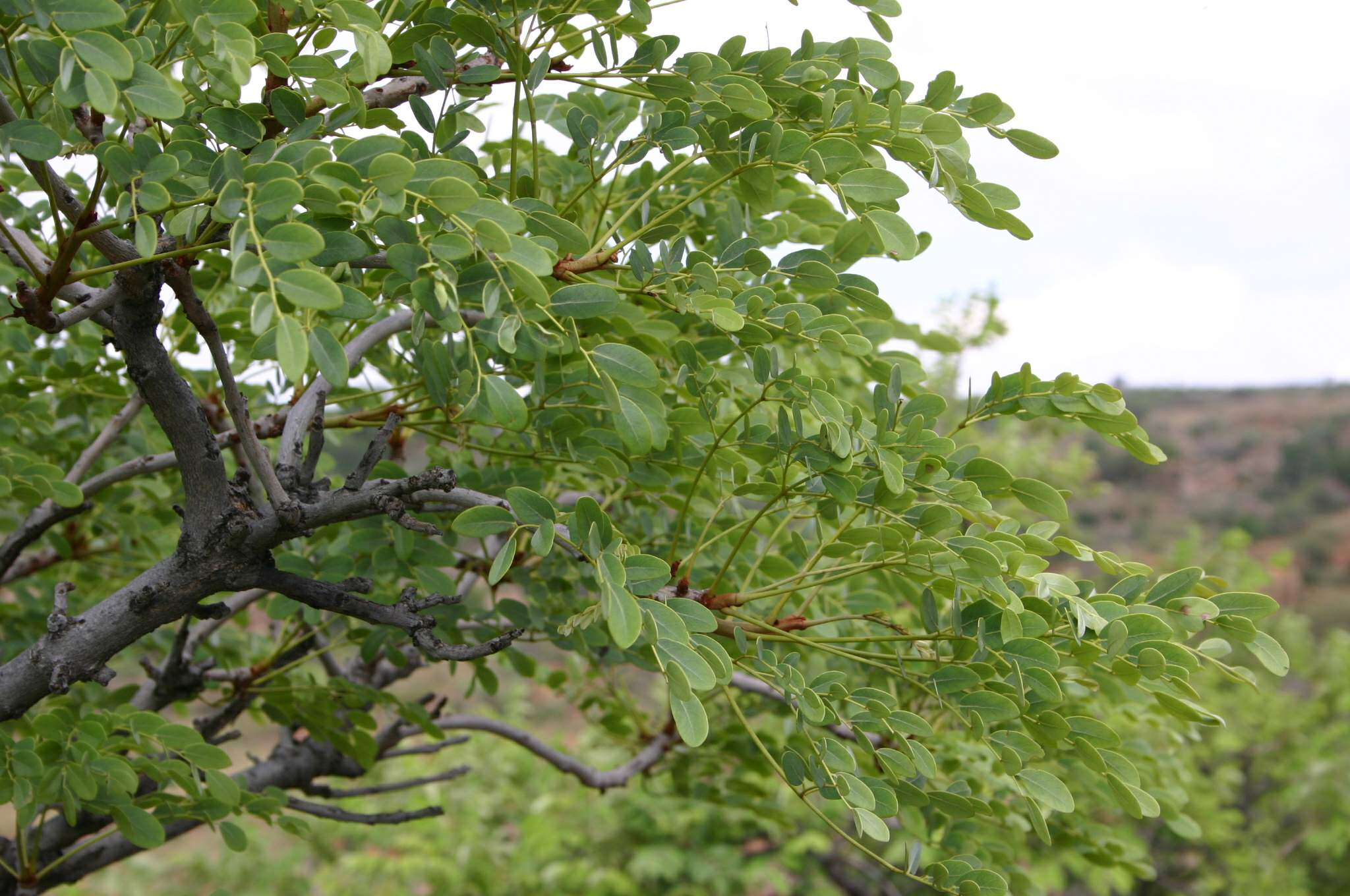
Foliage
