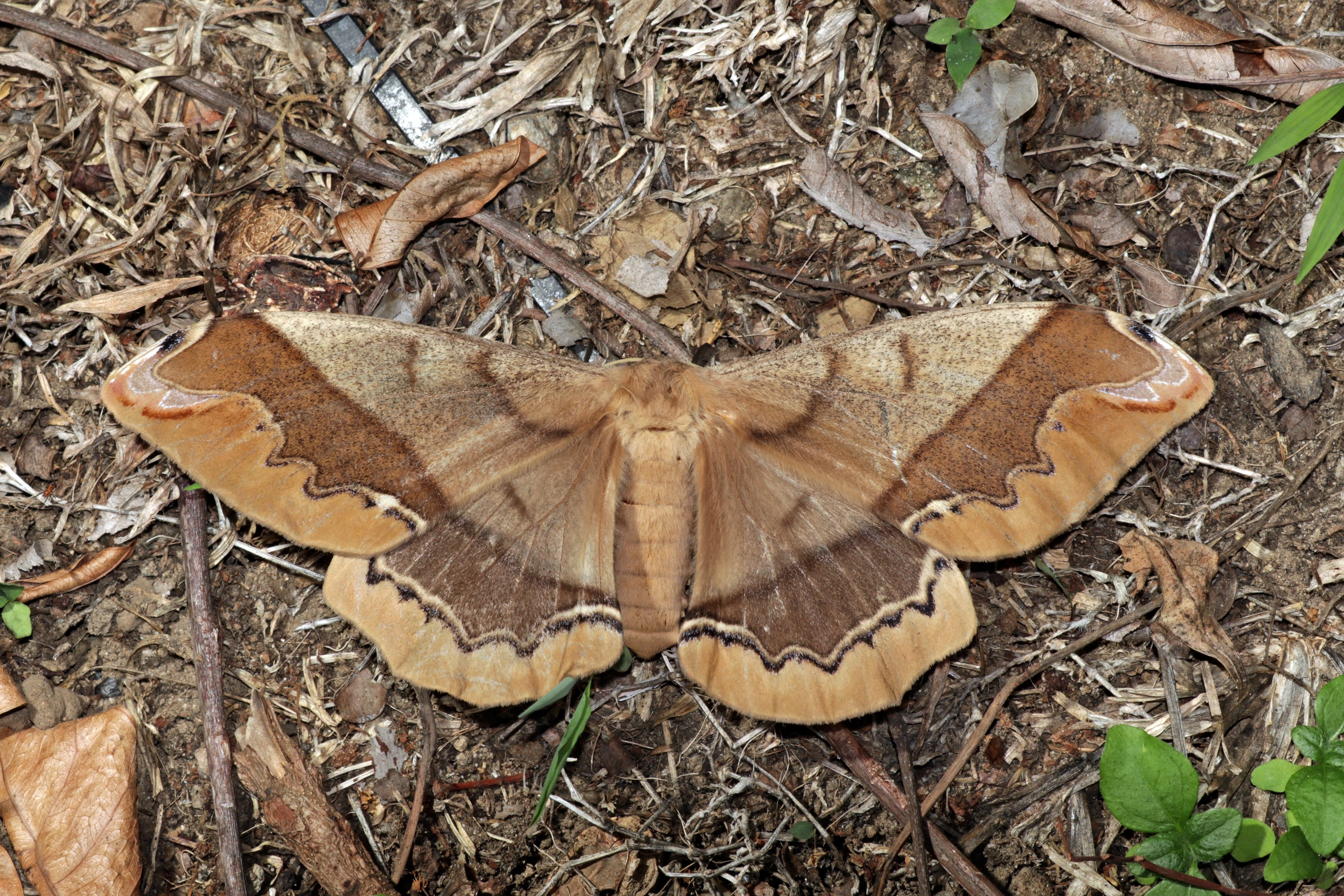
- Gamboa, Panama
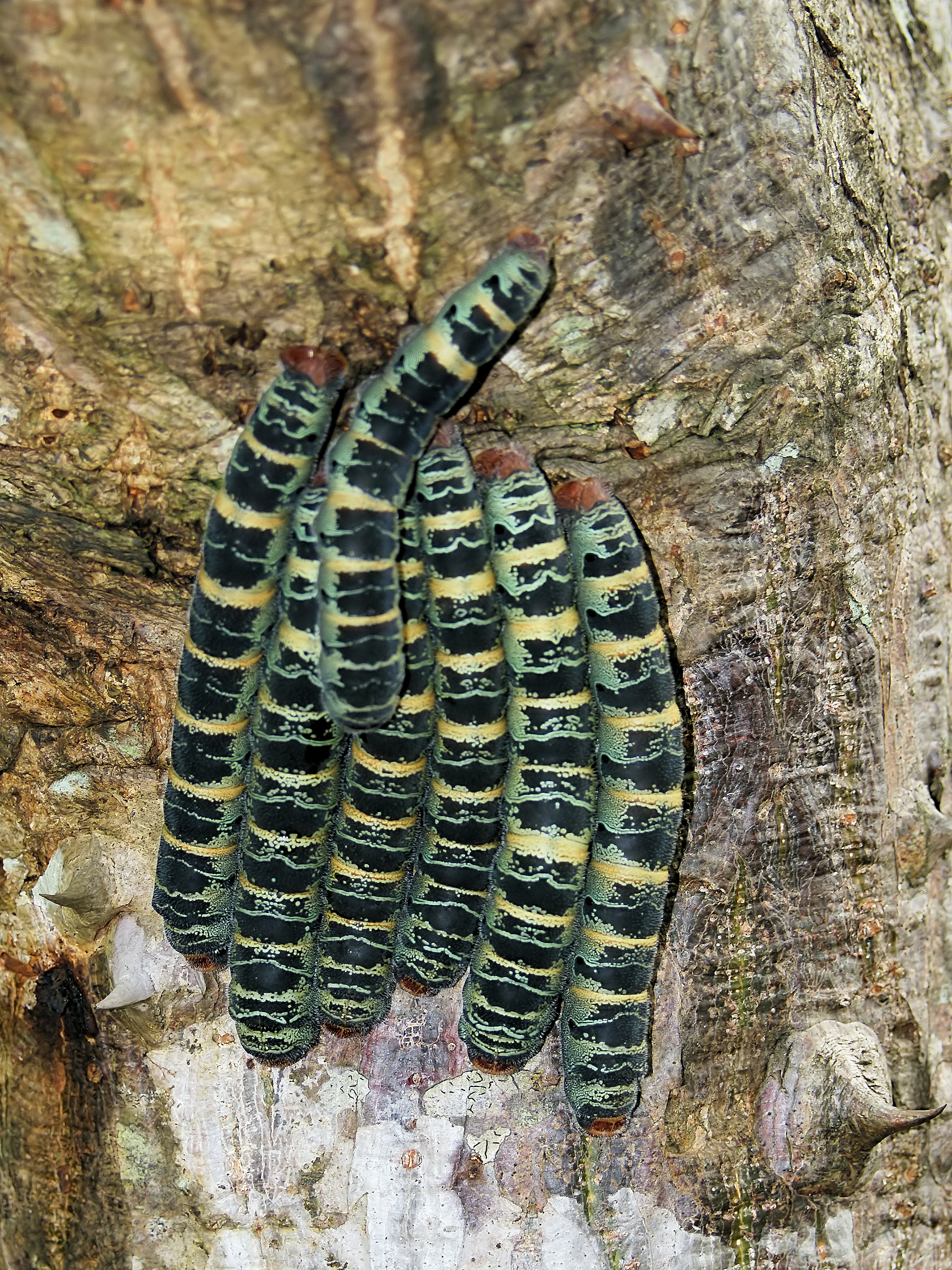
- Larvae on Bombacopsis quinata at Rincón de la Vieja, Costa Rica

Scientific classification
- Kingdom: Animalia
- Phylum: Arthropoda
- Clade: Pancrustacea
- Class: Insecta
- Order: Lepidoptera
- Family: Saturniidae
- Genus: Arsenura
- Species: A. armida

Binomial name
- Arsenura armida (Cramer, 1779)

Synonyms
- Phalaena armida Cramer, [1779]; Phalaena cassandra Cramer, [1779]; Bombyx erythrinae Fabricius, 1781; Arsenura erythrinae Godman & Salvin, 1886

= Arsenura armida =

Species of moth

Arsenura armida, the giant silk moth, is a moth of the family Saturniidae. It is found mainly in South and Central America, from Mexico to Bolivia, and Ecuador to south-eastern Brazil. It was first described by Pieter Cramer in 1779.

It is the only known Neotropical arsenurinae to exhibit a combination of strong aposematism, gregariousness, and trail-following behavior in its larval stage. The larvae are brightly colored, with bright black and yellow bands, which signal their unpleasant taste to birds. The larvae are also fatally poisonous to some species of birds. During the day, the larvae rest in large conspicuous masses on the trunks of trees, and descend at night to feed. When returning at dawn, they follow a silk-less pheromone trail to their original central place location. This social behavior is remarkable for the larvae; other members of the genus live more solitary lives.

The larvae feed on Guazuma ulmifolia, Rollinia membranacea and Bombacopsis quinatum.

After the larva's fourth instar, it will descend from the larval mass, excavate a small chamber in the soil and pupate. Then, shortly after the rainy season in June, the pupa will eclose (emerge). The adult form of the species are large brown moths which possess a wingspan of 100–120 mm. The adults will mate the same night they emerge, and afterwards the females will lay their eggs in large batches on the underside tree leaves.

To the indigenous people of the Zongolica area of Veracruz, the larvae are also a form of sustenance; they are gathered and eaten after being cooked.

== Taxonomy and naming ==
Arsenura armida is also known as the giant silk moth. It belongs to the subfamily Arsenurinae, consisting of approximately 57 species of Neotropical saturniids found from tropical Mexico to northern Argentina.

== Morphology and identification ==
The young larvae exhibit aposematism through their bright yellow and black-ringed bodies and red heads. The later instars are darker and "duskier" than early instars. They possess a dark brown head, a soma covered with fine short setae, and black tentacle-like protuberances on the dorsum of the thoracic segments. The intersegmental membrane is colored with thin orange-yellow rings.

The adults are large brown moths that like to rest with spread wings. They are predominantly dull colored, though some may display complex patterns. The adult wingspan is 100–120 mm.

== Distribution and habitat ==
The giant silk moth occurs mainly in Central and Southern America, from tropical Mexico to southeastern Brazil. They can be found on Guazuma ulmifolia, Rollinia membranacea, and Bombacopsis quinatum plants. They are also found in Costa Rica in all wildland ecosystems from dry forest to very wet rain-forest.

== Life cycle and behavior ==
Giant silk moth caterpillars are noted for their gregariousness in all phases of larval development. A peculiar phenomenon is the shift in different forms of social behavior from early to late instars.

In early instars, the larvae aggregate at all times in different patches and engage in nomadic foraging. As they age, these moths display a shift to a central foraging location so that larvae feed solitarily at night but, when done feeding, ascend to the canopy at roughly the same time to rest diurnally.

Hypotheses have been made to try and explain this shift in behavior. In general, caterpillar feeding behavior is shaped by the joint effects of phylogenetic history, larval nutritional ecology, size or appearance, and defensive ecology. Such behavior shifts can be found in other species. For instance, the larvae of many swallowtails begin as cryptic mimics of bird droppings but then switch to aposematism or aggressive mimicry in later instars.

Predation and/or parasitism is hypothesized to have played a role in the grouping behavior and aposematism of the giant silk moth. It is known that the late instar larvae are lethally poisonous to predators such as trogon nestlings, among others, when swallowed. The bright colors, augmented by the large number of caterpillars in a larval mass, are a visible deterrent to any would-be predators.

=== Early instars – first to third ===
The larvae hatch from large egg masses laid on the underside of leaves. Unlike their close relatives, the first-instar larvae are neither cryptic nor solitary. They hatch in groups, and feed together, side-by-side on leaves. They employ a nomadic foraging technique, moving together when resources are exhausted. During the nomadic foraging phase, the caterpillars utilize a pheromone trail to promote group cohesion, as well as mark trails between feeding sites. In the fourth instar and onwards, the pheromone trail is mainly used as a marker to convey information for relocation to the central place site.

=== Late instars – fourth to prepupation ===
By the fourth instar the larvae begin to rest diurnally in large conspicuous masses on the lower trunk of larger branches. They adopt a new feeding behavior, called central place foraging. In this behavior, caterpillars rest during the day in large visible groups, then mobilize at dusk to forage nocturnally as solitary larvae in the canopy. At dawn, they return to the original central place using pheromone trails.

To date, giant silk moth larvae are one of the few social Lepidoptera known where silk is not produced at all when foraging. The trails they follow are all pheromone based. The pheromones are deposited by caterpillars as they move to distant feed sites. These trails facilitate the re-aggregation of the group at the new feeding location and help prevent separation. At dawn, caterpillars will follow a pheromone trail to the original central place site to form bivouacs.

Studies have shown that larval trail following can be elicited by wiping cuticular material collected from the venter and dorsum of the abdomen of giant silk moth caterpillars onto the host plant. Crude extracts of homogenated somatic tissue can also elicit the same response. The trail marker is hypothesized to be a component of the cuticle that is passively deposited from the posterior-ventral region of the abdomen as larvae move over the host plant. Tree architecture also plays a role in re-aggregation. Trees with a single trunk funnel aggregate returning caterpillars more quickly and more densely than those with multiple trunks.

The same bivouac can be used by a particular group of caterpillars, though research has found that individual caterpillars do not exhibit strict site fidelity. An individual caterpillar may sometime shift sites when descended of the tree, depending on which pheromone trails it decides to follow on its return journey to a central site.

Larvae continue this central place foraging behavior until they leave the tree as prepupates to solitarily excavate a pupation chamber in the soil, where they pupate.

=== Eclosion and adult life ===
Eclosion occurs in June, shortly after the beginning of the rainy season. The pupae eclose after spending a long dry season as solitary and dormant pupae 2–10 cm below the soil surface. In captivity, both sexes eclose about an hour after dark and mating takes place on the same night pupation occurs. The following night, females look for a suitable food plant like Guazuma ulmifolia, where they will lay their entire egg load in one mass on the underside of a leaf.

Occasionally females will split the clutch into two roughly equal-sized masses, both of which may be laid on the same night or over two nights. The average egg mass contains about 300 to 400 eggs. Females live for 6 to 8 days after eclosion, just like other related saturniids.

The giant silk moth differs drastically from its close relatives in terms of ovipositioning behavior. Female moths lay all of their eggs in a large cluster on the underside of a leaf, whereas females from other species of Arsenurinae lay one or two eggs at a time and at different individual trees. The caterpillars of other arsenurites are cryptic and not social, and will hence benefit more from being laid in single batches.

The eggs will hatch after 12 to 14 days.

== Interactions with humans ==
The giant silk moth is edible in its larval stage and is consumed by some indigenous peoples of Mexico. This practice is called entomophagy. The Ixcohuapa community of the Zongolica area of Veracruz, Mexico are known to gather and consume the early instar larvae. Larvae can be cooked and then eaten as an alternative source of protein. People are also known to preserve the larvae in a vinegar solution that gives them the taste of herring. Larvae are usually sold in the streets either in ambulant markets or by independent street vendors.

There exist no laws to regulate the collection and commercialization of these organisms, which are consumed in enormous quantities and could be in risk of extinction.
