= Peter Maassen =

German entomologist

Peter Maassen, also J. Peter Maassen (9 December 1810 – 2 August 1890), was a German entomologist born in Duisburg.

He originally intended to be a member of the clergy, but ultimately spent more than 35 years as an employee (later as superintendent) of the Berg-Markisch Railway which runs through the Wupper Valley. In this capacity he was stationed in Aix-la-Chapelle, Elberfeld and lastly Düsseldorf.

During his lifetime he amassed a large collection of Lepidoptera specimens from European and exotic locales. His personal entomological excursions largely took place in Germany, Switzerland and Italy.

His principal work was titled Beitrage zur Schmetterlingskunde, a five-part series on Saturniidae that was first published in 1869. Later parts of the work were co-authored with Gustav Weymer (1833–1914). Also with Weymer, he wrote (1890) Lepidopteren gesammelt auf einer Reise durch Colombia, Ecuador, Perú, Brasilien, Argentinien und Bolivien in den Jahren 1868-1877 von Alphons Stübel, published in Berlin by A. Asher & Co. Other literary efforts by Maassen were for the most part confined to articles printed in the Stettiner entomologische Zeitung.

He died in Falkensteig on August 2, 1890, during an exploratory trip to the Black Forest. His collection is conserved in Museum für Naturkunde in Berlin.
