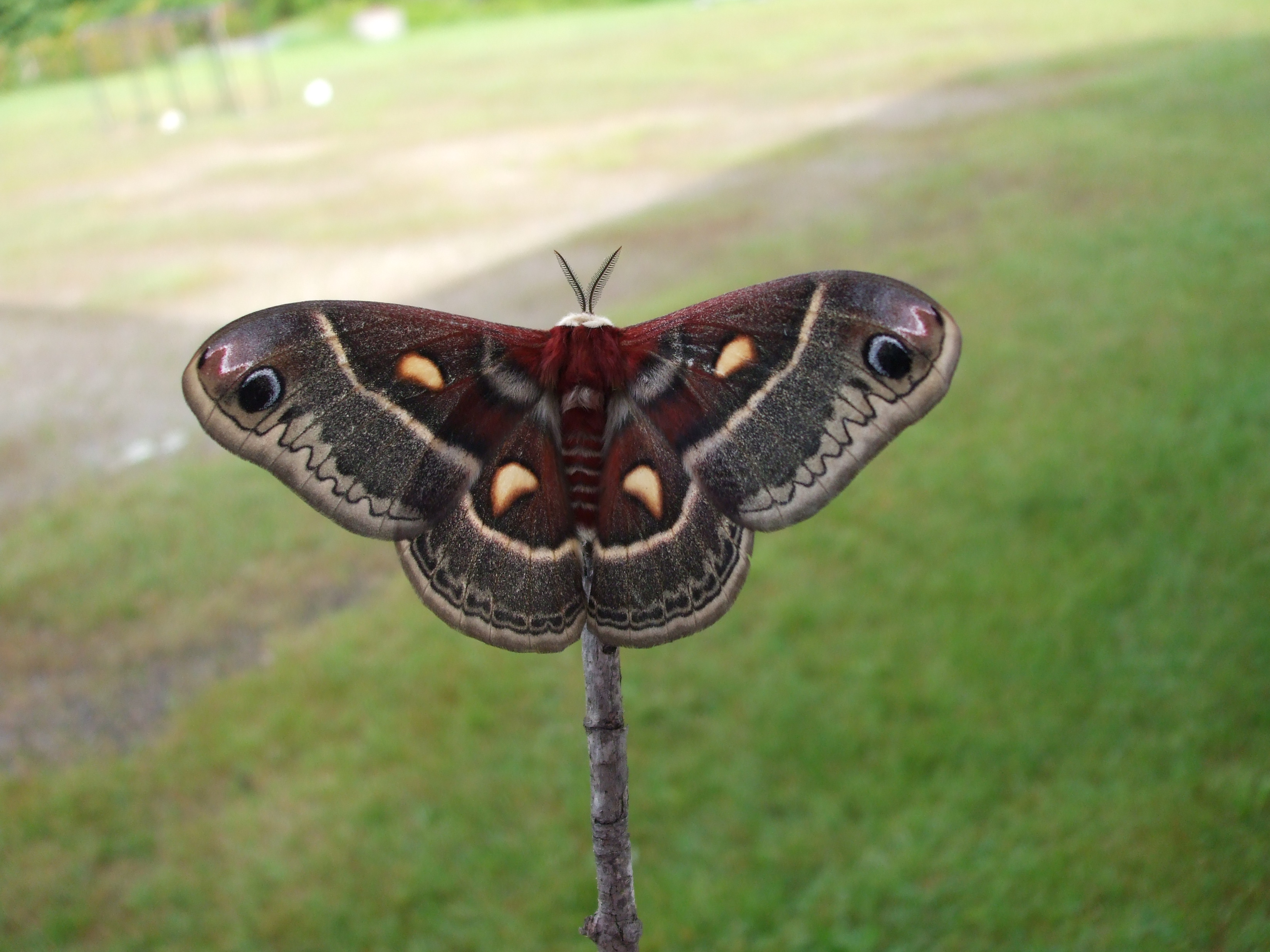
- Female Columbia silkmoth (Hyalophora columbia: Attacini)

Scientific classification
- Kingdom: Animalia
- Phylum: Arthropoda
- Clade: Pancrustacea
- Class: Insecta
- Order: Lepidoptera
- Family: Saturniidae
- Subfamily: Saturniinae

Tribes
- Attacini; Bunaeini; Micragonini; Saturniini; Urotini; and see text

= Saturniinae =

Subfamily of moths

The Saturniinae or saturniines are a subfamily of the family Saturniidae, also known as giant silkmoths. They are commonly known as emperor moths or wild silk moths. They are easily spotted by the eyespots on the upper surface of their wings. Some exhibit realistic eye-like markings, whilst others have adapted the eyespots to form crescent moon or angular shapes or have lost their wing scales to create transparent windows. They are medium to very large moths, with adult wingspans ranging from 7.5 to 15 cm, in some cases even more. They consist of some of the largest sized Lepidoptera, such as the luna moth, atlas moth, and many more. The Saturniinae is an important source of wild silk and human food in many different cultures.

The saturniine genera, approximately 169 in number, are divided into four major and one minor (Micragonini) tribes. The genus Adafroptilum presently consists of a group of species with undetermined relationships.

Adults in the Saturniinae typically live about 5–12 days and are mostly nocturnal, excluding males in four of the subfamilies. The moths do not eat during their short lives and their mouths are not fully formed, except for one genus, eudaemonia (moth). In some species of Saturniinae, there is unmistakable sexual dimorphism. The females in these subfamilies can weigh almost double that of the males, are larger in size, and have larger wings.

The Saturniinae's eggs are oblong and are laid flat against each other in clusters. Once hatched, the larval period lasts about 78 days. They typically pass through five larval instars (excluding egg, pupa and adult), although some may have more. The pupal stage takes place in an often yellowish cocoon. In this stage, they resemble small wooden barrels in shape and color.

== Genera ==
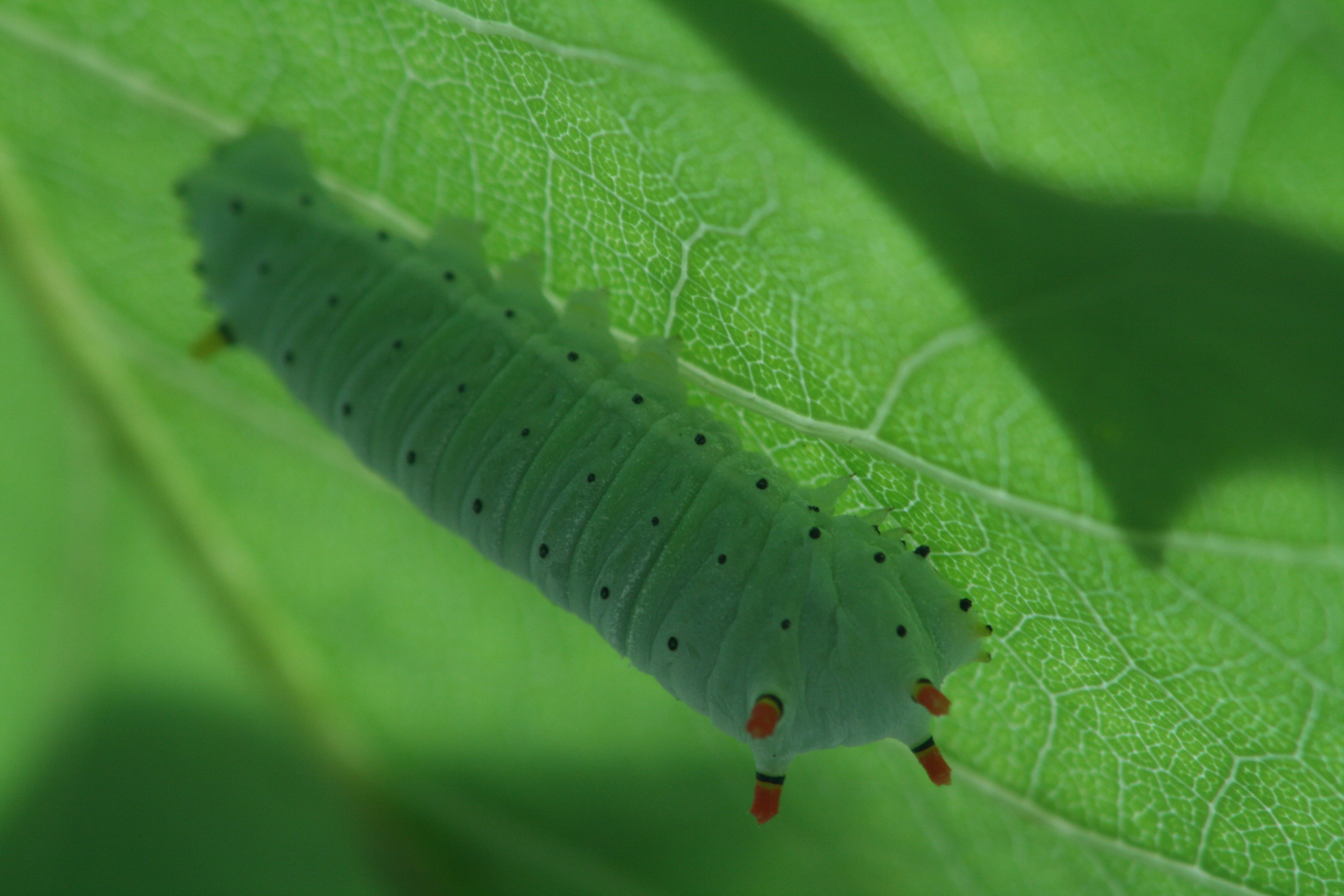
Callosamia angulifera caterpillar (Attacini)

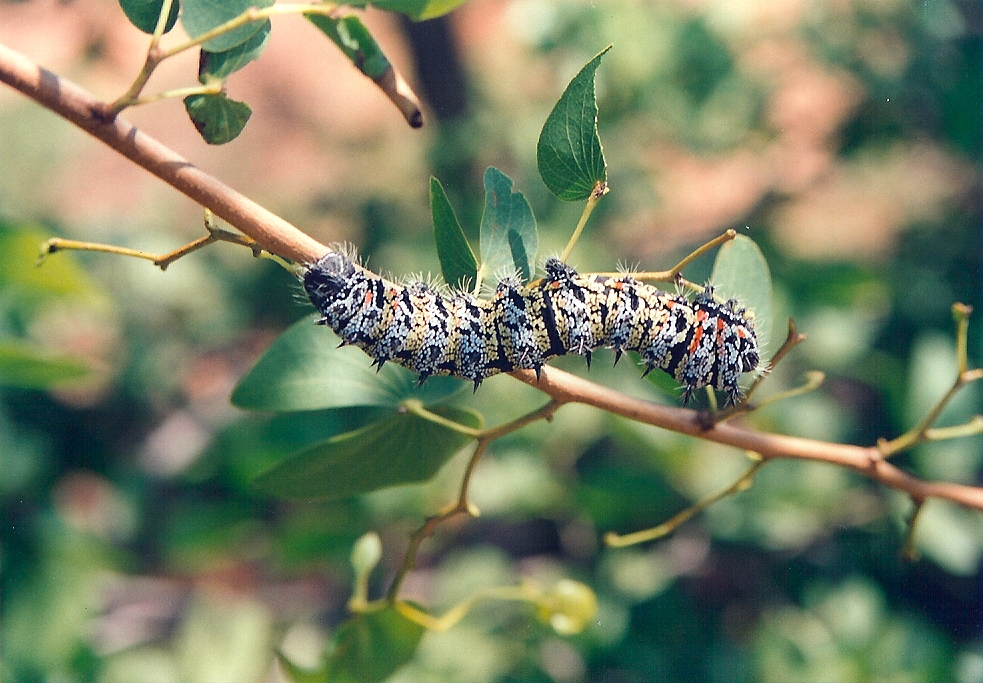
A "mopane worm", the edible caterpillar of Gonimbrasia belina (Bunaeini)

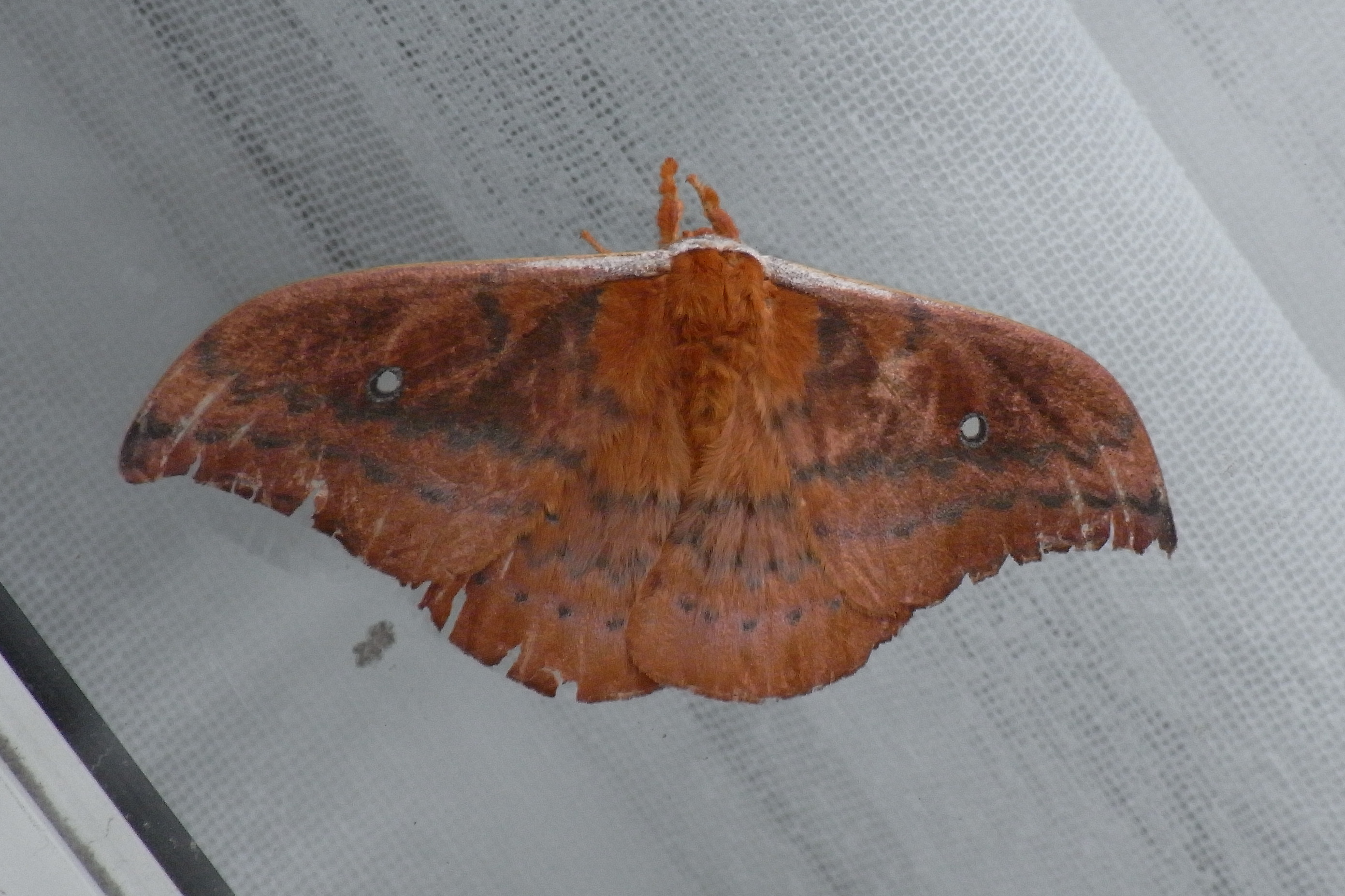
Syntherata janetta of the Saturniini

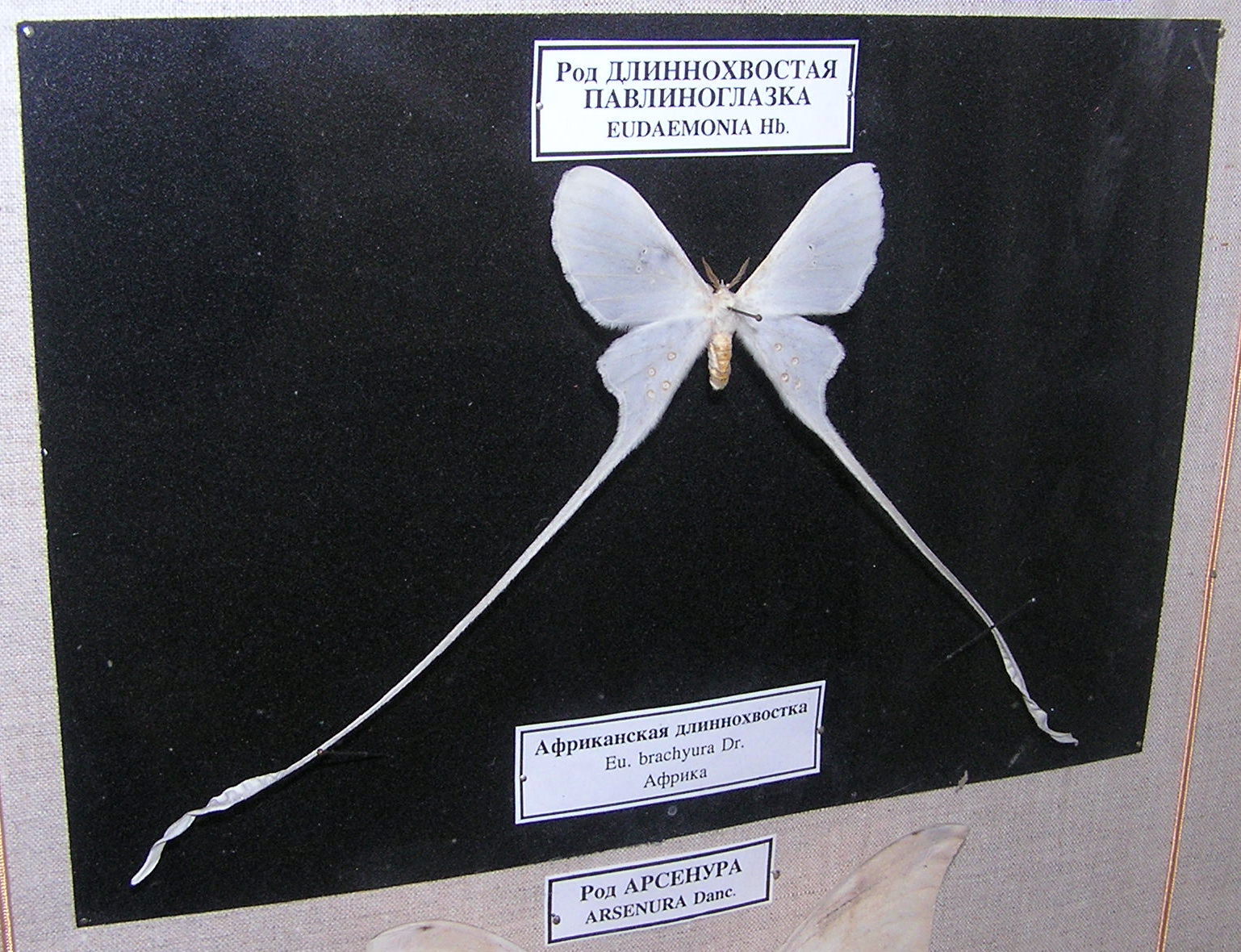
Eudaemonia brachyura (Urotini)

Tribe Attacini

- Archaeoattacus
- Attacus
- Callosamia
- Coscinocera
- Epiphora
- Eupackardia
- Hyalophora
- Rhodinia
- Rothschildia Grote, 1896
- Samia

Tribe Bunaeini Packard, 1902

- Athletes
- Aurivillius
- Bunaea
- Bunaeopsis
- Cinabra
- Cirina
- Eochroa
- Gonimbrasia
- Gynanisa
- Heniocha
- Imbrasia
- Leucopteryx
- Lobobunaea
- Melanocera
- Nudaurelia
- Protogynanisa
- Pseudimbrasia
- Pseudobunaea
- Rohaniella
- Ubaena

Tribe Micragonini Cockerell in Packard, 1914

- Adafroptilum
- Carnegia
- Decachorda
- Goodia
- Holocerina
- Ludia
- Micragone
- Orthogonioptilum
- Pseudoludia
- Vegetia

Tribe Saturniini Boisduval, 1837

- Actias – Asian-American moon moths
- Agapema (sometimes included in Saturnia)
- Antheraea – tussar moths
- Antheraeopsis
- Argema – African moon moths
- Caligula (sometimes included in Saturnia or Rinaca)
- Calosaturnia (sometimes included in Saturnia)
- Ceranchia
- Copaxa
- Cricula
- Eudia (mostly included in Saturnia)
- Graellsia
- Lemaireia
- Loepa
- Loepantheraea
- Neodiphthera
- Neoris (mostly included in Saturnia)
- Opodiphthera
- Pararhodia
- Perisomena (sometimes included in Saturnia)
- Rinaca
- Saturnia – typical emperor moths
- Solus
- Syntherata

Tribe Urotini

- Antherina
- Antistathmoptera
- Eosia
- Eudaemonia
- Maltagorea
- Parusta
- Pselaphelia
- Pseudantheraea
- Pseudaphelia
- Sinobirma
- Tagoropsis
- Urota
- Usta
