= Tagoropsis monsarrati =

Scientific classification
- Kingdom: Animalia
- Phylum: Arthropoda
- Class: Insecta
- Order: Lepidoptera
- Family: Saturniidae
- Genus: Tagoropsis
- Species: T. monsarrati

Binomial name
- Tagoropsis monsarrati Griveaud, 1966

Species of moth

Tagoropsis monsarrati is a moth of the family Saturniidae first described by Paul Griveaud in 1966. It is native to central Madagascar.

The males of this species have a wingspan of about 56 mm, females 68 mm. Head and front are ochreous red, antennae brownish red. The wings are greyish, with dark grey transversal lines, with spots of whitish scales.
