= Aurivillius =

Aurivillius may refer to:

- Aurivillius (moth), a moth genus in the family Saturniidae
- Aurivillius phases, a type of mineral
- Karl Aurivillius (1717–1786), a Swedish orientalist
- Carl Wilhelm Samuel Aurivillius (1854–1899, Auriv.), a Swedish botanist, brother of Per Olof Christopher
- Per Olof Christopher Aurivillius (1843–1928), a Swedish entomologist, brother of Carl Wilhelm Samuel
- Sven Magnus Aurivillius (1892–1928), a Swedish zoologist, son of Per Olof Christopher
