= Carnegia =

Carnegia may refer to:

- Carnegia (moth), a moth genus
- 671 Carnegia, a minor planet

== See also ==
- Carnegiea, a cactus genus
