= Ludia (disambiguation) =

Ludia is a video game development company.

Ludia may also refer to:

- Ludia (moth), a genus of moths in family Saturniidae
- Ludia (plant), a plant genus in family Salicaceae
