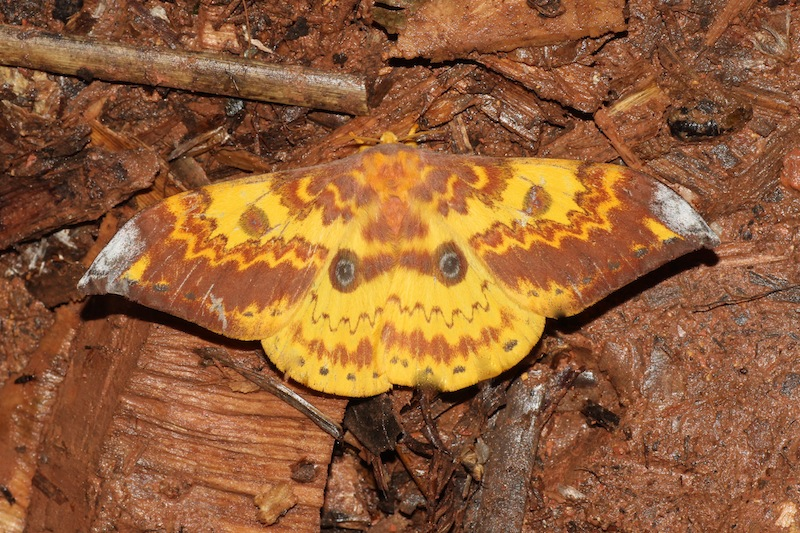

Scientific classification
- Kingdom: Animalia
- Phylum: Arthropoda
- Class: Insecta
- Order: Lepidoptera
- Family: Saturniidae
- Genus: Lemaireia
- Species: L. loepoides

Binomial name
- Lemaireia loepoides (Butler, 1880)

Synonyms
- Antheraea loepoides Butler, 1880; Syntherata loepoides

= Lemaireia loepoides =

Species of moth

Lemaireia loepoides is a species of moth of the family Saturniidae first described by Arthur Gardiner Butler in 1880. It is found on Borneo, Sumatra and Peninsular Malaysia.
