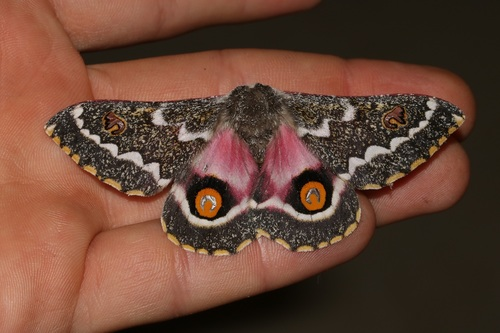

Scientific classification
- Domain: Eukaryota
- Kingdom: Animalia
- Phylum: Arthropoda
- Class: Insecta
- Order: Lepidoptera
- Family: Saturniidae
- Genus: Vegetia
- Species: V. grimmia

Binomial name
- Vegetia grimmia (Geyer, 1831)

Synonyms
- Heniocha grimmia Geyer, 1831

= Vegetia grimmia =

Species of moth

Vegetia grimmia is a species of moth in the family Saturniidae. It was described by Carl Geyer in 1831. It is found in South Africa.
