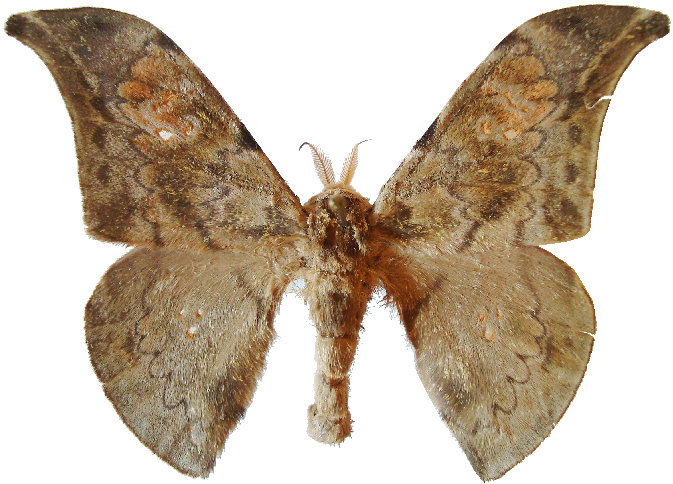
- Orthogonioptilum adegietum

Scientific classification
- Kingdom: Animalia
- Phylum: Arthropoda
- Class: Insecta
- Order: Lepidoptera
- Family: Saturniidae
- Subfamily: Saturniinae
- Genus: Orthogonioptilum; Karsch, 1893

= Orthogonioptilum =

Genus of moths

Orthogonioptilum is a genus of moths in the family Saturniidae first described by Ferdinand Karsch in 1893.

== Species ==
- Orthogonioptilum adiegetum Karsch, 1893
- Orthogonioptilum adustum Jordan, 1922
- Orthogonioptilum andreasum Rougeot, 1967
- Orthogonioptilum apium Basquin, 1995
- Orthogonioptilum arnoldi Hering, 1932
- Orthogonioptilum bergeri Rougeot, 1962
- Orthogonioptilum bernardii Bouyer, 1990
- Orthogonioptilum bernaudi Darge, 1996
- Orthogonioptilum bimaculatum Rougeot, 1972
- Orthogonioptilum bouyeri Darge, 1990
- Orthogonioptilum brunneum Jordan, 1922
- Orthogonioptilum caecum Darge, 2003
- Orthogonioptilum chalix Jordan, 1922
- Orthogonioptilum chaminadei Darge, 1996
- Orthogonioptilum conspectum Rougeot, 1962
- Orthogonioptilum crystallinum Darge, 1993
- Orthogonioptilum csomaense Bouyer, 1992
- Orthogonioptilum dallastai Darge, 1988
- Orthogonioptilum dargei Basquin, 1992
- Orthogonioptilum deletum Jordan, 1922
- Orthogonioptilum diabolicum Rougeot, 1971
- Orthogonioptilum emmanuellae Basquin, 1995
- Orthogonioptilum falcatissimum Rougeot, 1971
- Orthogonioptilum fang Darge, 1990
- Orthogonioptilum filippii Darge, 1992
- Orthogonioptilum fontainei Rougeot, 1962
- Orthogonioptilum galleyi Basquin, 1992
- Orthogonioptilum garmsi Bouyer, 1995
- Orthogonioptilum herbuloti Darge, 1988
- Orthogonioptilum hodeberti Darge, 1988
- Orthogonioptilum ianthinum Rougeot, 1960
- Orthogonioptilum infernarum Darge, 1990
- Orthogonioptilum infinitum Darge, 1992
- Orthogonioptilum kahli Holland, 1921
- Orthogonioptilum kasaiensis Dufrane, 1953
- Orthogonioptilum kivuensis Bouyer, 1990
- Orthogonioptilum klinzigi Darge, 1988
- Orthogonioptilum lemairei Darge, 1986
- Orthogonioptilum loloense Basquin, 1995
- Orthogonioptilum luminosum (Bouvier, 1930)
- Orthogonioptilum modestum Rougeot, 1965
- Orthogonioptilum monochromum Karsch, 1893
- Orthogonioptilum neglectum Darge, 1995
- Orthogonioptilum neoprox Darge, 1992
- Orthogonioptilum nigrescens Bouyer, 1994
- Orthogonioptilum nimbaense Rougeot, 1962
- Orthogonioptilum obamba Darge, 1990
- Orthogonioptilum occidentalis Bouyer, 1995
- Orthogonioptilum ochraceum Rougeot, 1958
- Orthogonioptilum oremansi Darge, 2008
- Orthogonioptilum paveci Darge, 1992
- Orthogonioptilum perarcuatum Darge, 1993
- Orthogonioptilum piersoni Bouyer, 1989
- Orthogonioptilum prox Karsch, 1893
- Orthogonioptilum rougeoti Darge, 1973
- Orthogonioptilum sejunctum Darge, 1993
- Orthogonioptilum silvaticum Darge, 1992
- Orthogonioptilum solium Bouyer, 1990
- Orthogonioptilum subuelense Rougeot, 1972
- Orthogonioptilum tristis (Sonthonnax, 1899)
- Orthogonioptilum uelense Rougeot, 1967
- Orthogonioptilum umbrulatum Basquin, 1995
- Orthogonioptilum vestigiatum (Holland, 1893)
- Orthogonioptilum violascens (Rebel, 1914)
