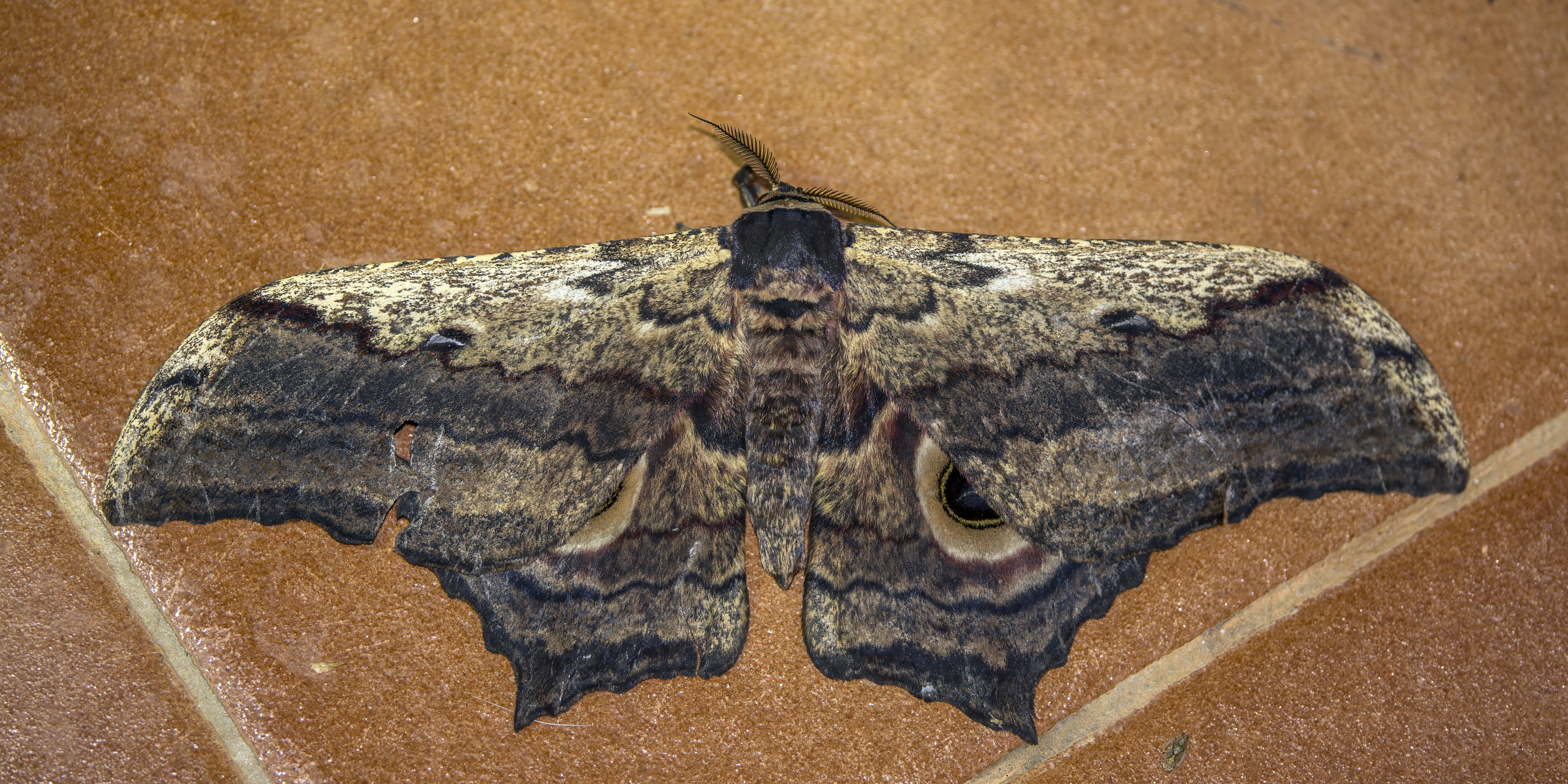
- A. albicans, male, Ghana

Scientific classification
- Kingdom: Animalia
- Phylum: Arthropoda
- Class: Insecta
- Order: Lepidoptera
- Family: Saturniidae
- Subfamily: Saturniinae
- Genus: Athletes; Karsch, 1896

= Athletes (moth) =

Genus of moths

Athletes is a genus of moths in the family Saturniidae first described by Ferdinand Karsch in 1896.

== Species ==
- Athletes albicans Rougeot, 1955
- Athletes ethra (Westwood, 1849)
- Athletes gigas (Sonthonnax, 1902)
- Athletes nyanzae Rebel, 1904
- Athletes semialba (Sonthonnax, 1904)
