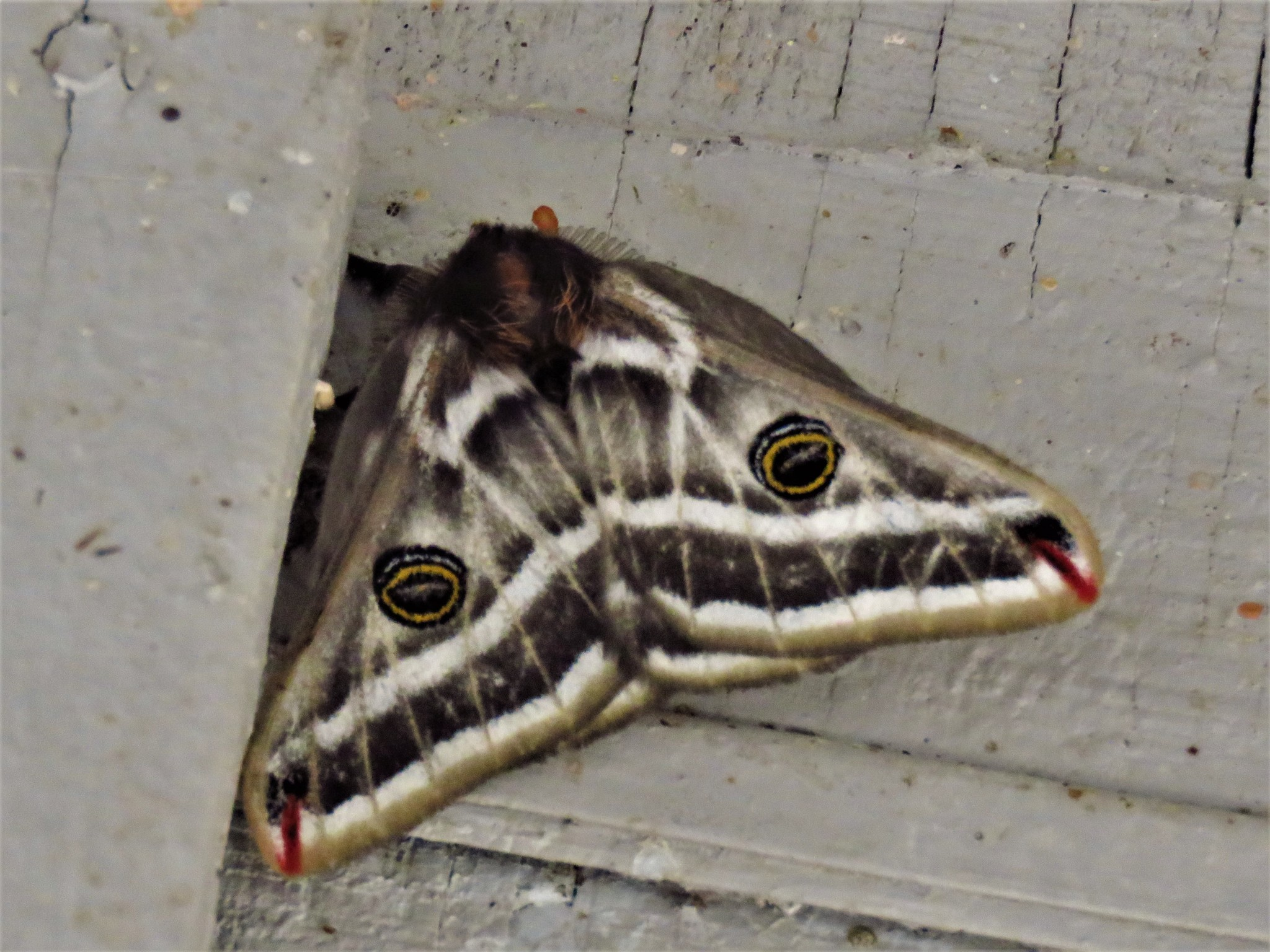
- Agapema platensis

Scientific classification
- Kingdom: Animalia
- Phylum: Arthropoda
- Class: Insecta
- Order: Lepidoptera
- Family: Saturniidae
- Subfamily: Saturniinae
- Tribe: Saturniini
- Genus: Agapema; Neumoegen & Dyar, 1894

= Agapema =

Genus of moths

Agapema is a genus of moths allied to Saturnia, in the family Saturniidae. The genus was first described by Berthold Neumoegen and Harrison Gray Dyar Jr. in 1894.

== Species ==
- Agapema anona (Ottolengui, 1903)
- Agapema dyari Cockerell, 1914
- Agapema galbina (Clemens, 1860)
- Agapema homogena Dyar, 1908
- Agapema platensis Peigler & Kendall, 1993
- Agapema solita Ferguson, 1972
