= Vegetia dewitzi =

Scientific classification
- Domain: Eukaryota
- Kingdom: Animalia
- Phylum: Arthropoda
- Class: Insecta
- Order: Lepidoptera
- Family: Saturniidae
- Genus: Vegetia
- Species: V. dewitzi

Binomial name
- Vegetia dewitzi (Maassen & Weymer, 1886)

Synonyms
- Ludia dewitzi Maassen & Weymer, 1886

Species of moth

Vegetia dewitzi is a species of moth in the family Saturniidae. It was described by Peter Maassen and Gustav Weymer in 1886. It is found in South Africa.
