= Parusta =

Scientific classification
- Kingdom: Animalia
- Phylum: Arthropoda
- Class: Insecta
- Order: Lepidoptera
- Family: Saturniidae
- Subfamily: Saturniinae
- Genus: Parusta; Rothschild, 1907

Genus of moths

Parusta is a genus of moths in the family Saturniidae first described by Rothschild in 1907.

== Species ==
- Parusta thelxinoe Fawcett, 1915
- Parusta xanthops Rothschild, 1907
