= Adafroptilum acuminatum =

Scientific classification
- Domain: Eukaryota
- Kingdom: Animalia
- Phylum: Arthropoda
- Class: Insecta
- Order: Lepidoptera
- Family: Saturniidae
- Genus: Adafroptilum
- Species: A. acuminatum

Binomial name
- Adafroptilum acuminatum (Darge, 2003)

Species of moth

Adafroptilum acuminatum is a nocturnal species of moth in the family Saturniidae first described in 2003 by Philippe Darge. It is found in Tanzania.
