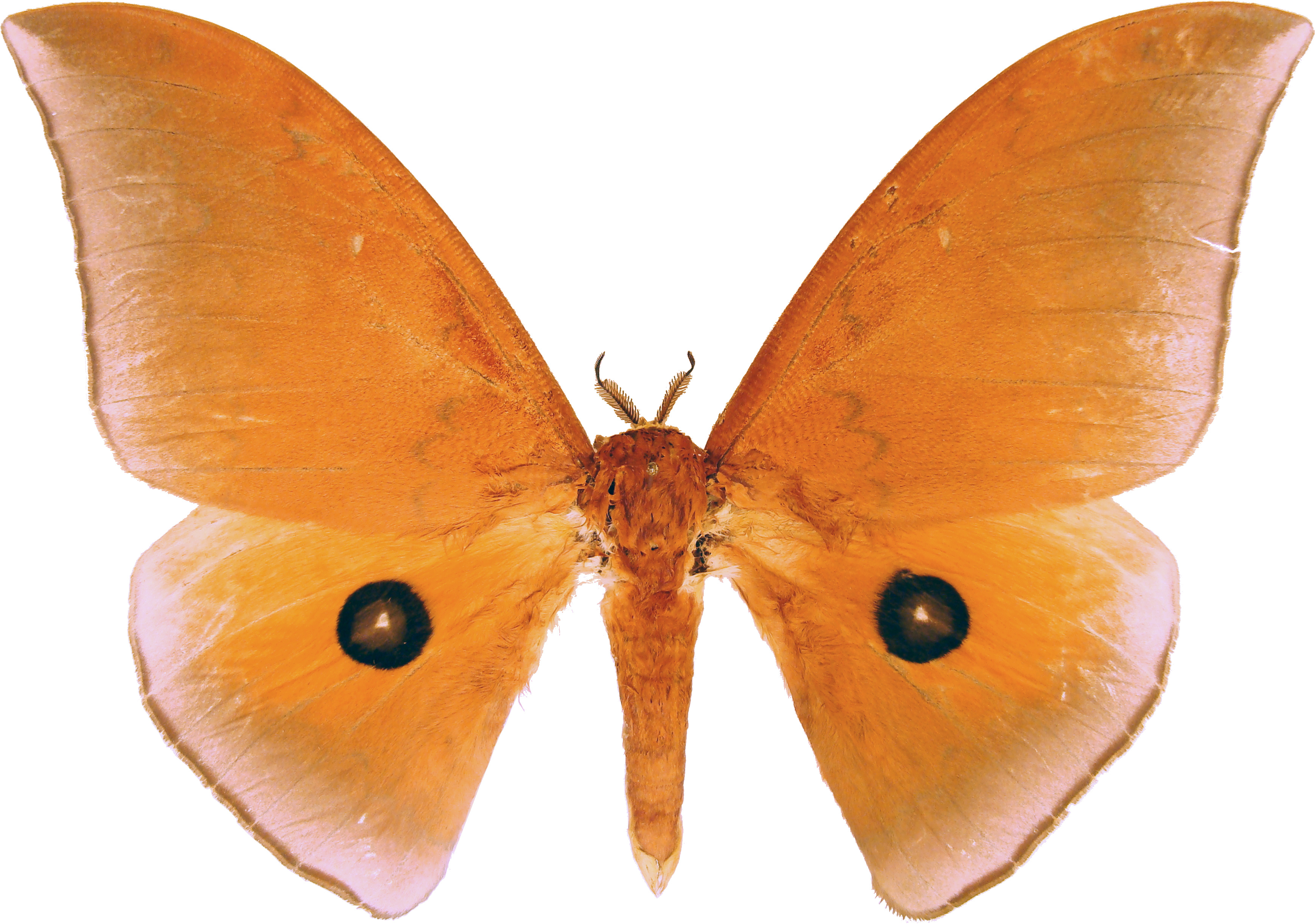
- Pseudobunaea alinda from Cameroon

Scientific classification
- Kingdom: Animalia
- Phylum: Arthropoda
- Class: Insecta
- Order: Lepidoptera
- Family: Saturniidae
- Genus: Pseudobunaea
- Species: P. alinda

Binomial name
- Pseudobunaea alinda (Drury, 1782)

Synonyms
- Phalaena alinda Drury, 1782; Lobobunaea morlandi Rothschild, 1907

= Pseudobunaea alinda =

Species of moth

Pseudobunaea alinda is a species of very large moths in the family Saturniidae. The species was first described by Dru Drury in 1782, and is found in Angola, Cameroon, Congo, DR Congo, Gabon, Guinea, Ivory Coast, Sierra Leone, and Tanzania.

== Description ==
Upper Side. Antennae pectinated. Neck buff-coloured. Thorax and abdomen brownish red, the centre of the former being grey. Anterior wings brown-red, darkest along the external edges, with two faint dark indented lines crossing them from the anterior to the posterior edges. A transparent spot is placed near the middle of the wings, about a quarter of an inch from the anterior edges, without any iris of a different colour. Posterior wings brown-red, and darkest along the external edges, having a few faint waved lines. Near the middle is a small transparent spot, edged with buff at the bottom, surrounded by a dark brown border, and which is also encircled by another quite black.

Under Side. Breast red-brown. Legs, abdomen, and wings entirely of a dark buff. All the faint waved lines, hardly discernible on the other side, are here very conspicuous. Close to the transparent spots, on the anterior wings, are two of a dark brown, and two larger are also placed close to the transparent ones in the posterior wings, without any of the circular ones which are on the upper side. Margins of the wings entire. Wing-span 7¾ inches (195 mm).
