= Pararhodia =

Scientific classification
- Kingdom: Animalia
- Phylum: Arthropoda
- Class: Insecta
- Order: Lepidoptera
- Family: Saturniidae
- Subfamily: Saturniinae
- Genus: Pararhodia; Cockerell, 1914

Genus of moths

Pararhodia is a genus of moths in the family Saturniidae first described by Theodore Dru Alison Cockerell in 1914.

== Species ==
- Pararhodia daviesorum Lemaire, 1979
- Pararhodia gyra (W. Rothschild & Jordan, 1905)
- Pararhodia meeki (Jordan, 1908)
- Pararhodia rotalis U. Paukstadt, L. Paukstadt & Suhardjono, 1992
- Pararhodia setekwa d`Abrera, 1998
