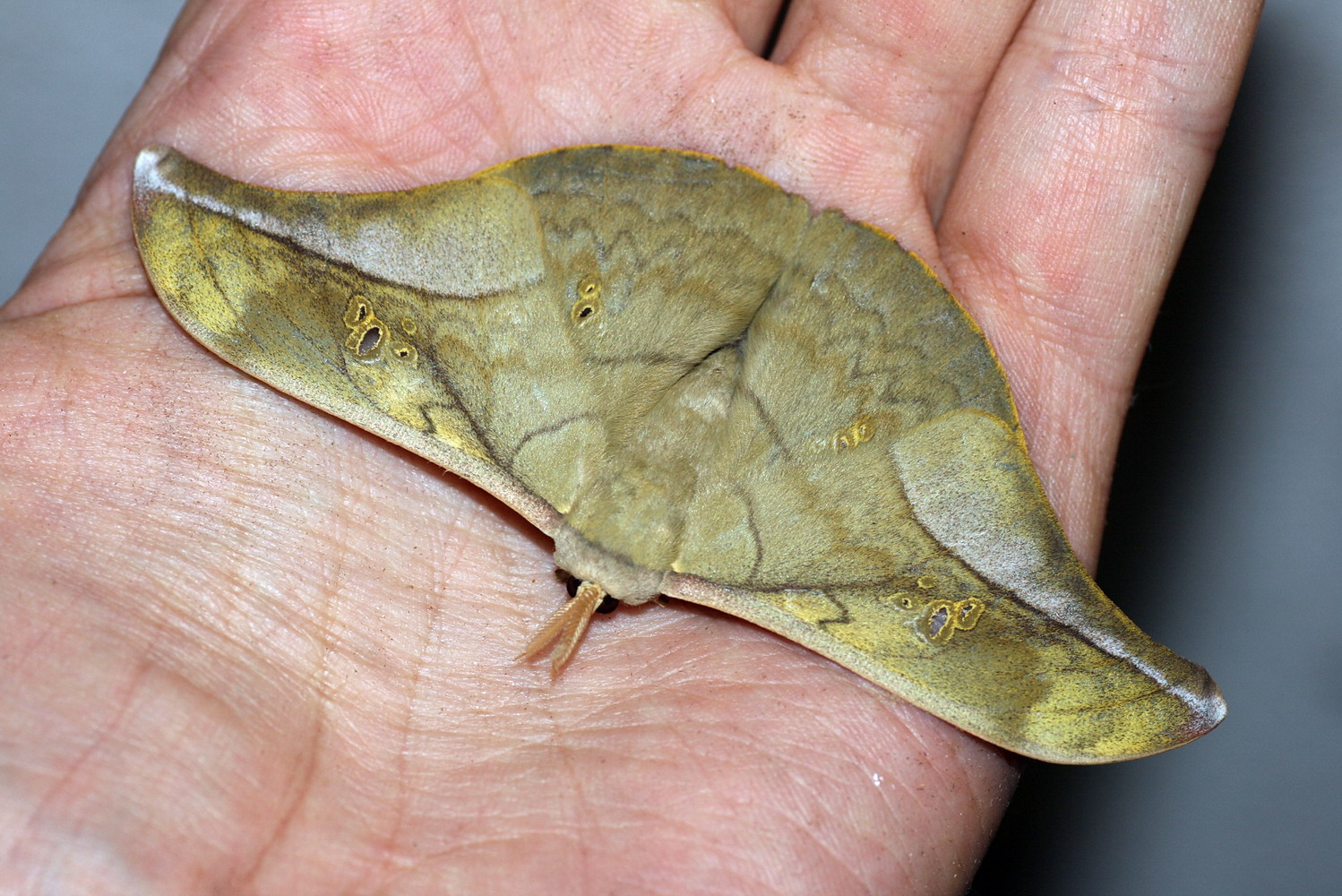

Scientific classification
- Kingdom: Animalia
- Phylum: Arthropoda
- Class: Insecta
- Order: Lepidoptera
- Family: Saturniidae
- Subfamily: Saturniinae
- Genus: Loepantheraea; Toxopeus, 1940

= Loepantheraea =

Genus of moths

Loepantheraea is a genus of moths in the family Saturniidae first described by Lambertus Johannes Toxopeus in 1940.

== Species ==
- Loepantheraea rosieri (Toxopeus, 1940)
