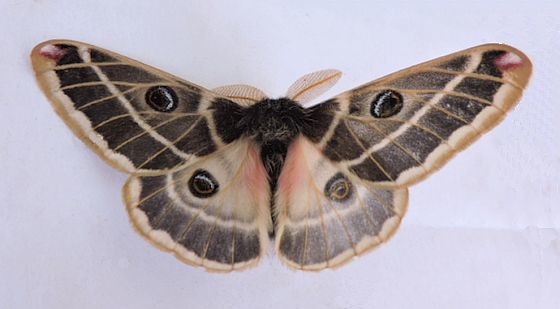

Scientific classification
- Kingdom: Animalia
- Phylum: Arthropoda
- Class: Insecta
- Order: Lepidoptera
- Family: Saturniidae
- Genus: Agapema
- Species: A. homogena

Binomial name
- Agapema homogena Dyar, 1908

= Agapema homogena =

Species of moth

Agapema homogena, commonly known as the Rocky Mountain Agapema, is a species of giant silkmoth in the family Saturniidae. It is found in Central America and North America.

The MONA or Hodges number for Agapema homogena is 7756.
