= Agapema galbina =

Scientific classification
- Kingdom: Animalia
- Phylum: Arthropoda
- Clade: Pancrustacea
- Class: Insecta
- Order: Lepidoptera
- Family: Saturniidae
- Genus: Agapema
- Species: A. galbina

Binomial name
- Agapema galbina (Clemens, 1860)

Species of moth

Agapema galbina, the greasewood moth, is a moth in the family Saturniidae. It was described in 1860.
