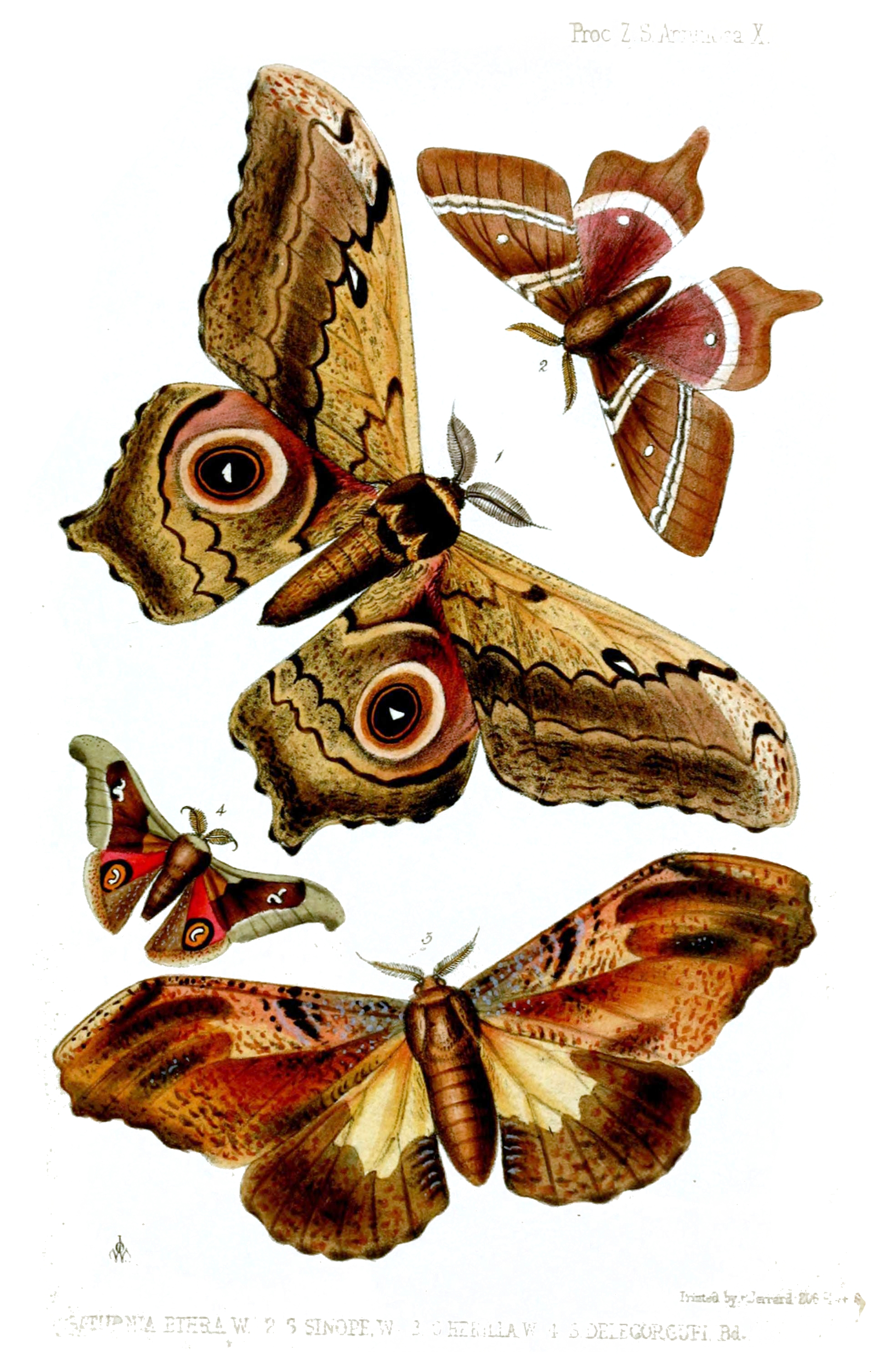
- largest one

Scientific classification
- Kingdom: Animalia
- Phylum: Arthropoda
- Class: Insecta
- Order: Lepidoptera
- Family: Saturniidae
- Subfamily: Saturniinae
- Genus: Urota; Westwood, 1849
- Species: U. sinope

Binomial name
- Urota sinope Westwood, 1849

= Urota =

Genus of moths

Urota is a monotypic moth genus in the family Saturniidae erected by John O. Westwood in 1849. Its single species, Urota sinope, was described by the same author in the same year. It was described from KwaZulu-Natal, South Africa.
