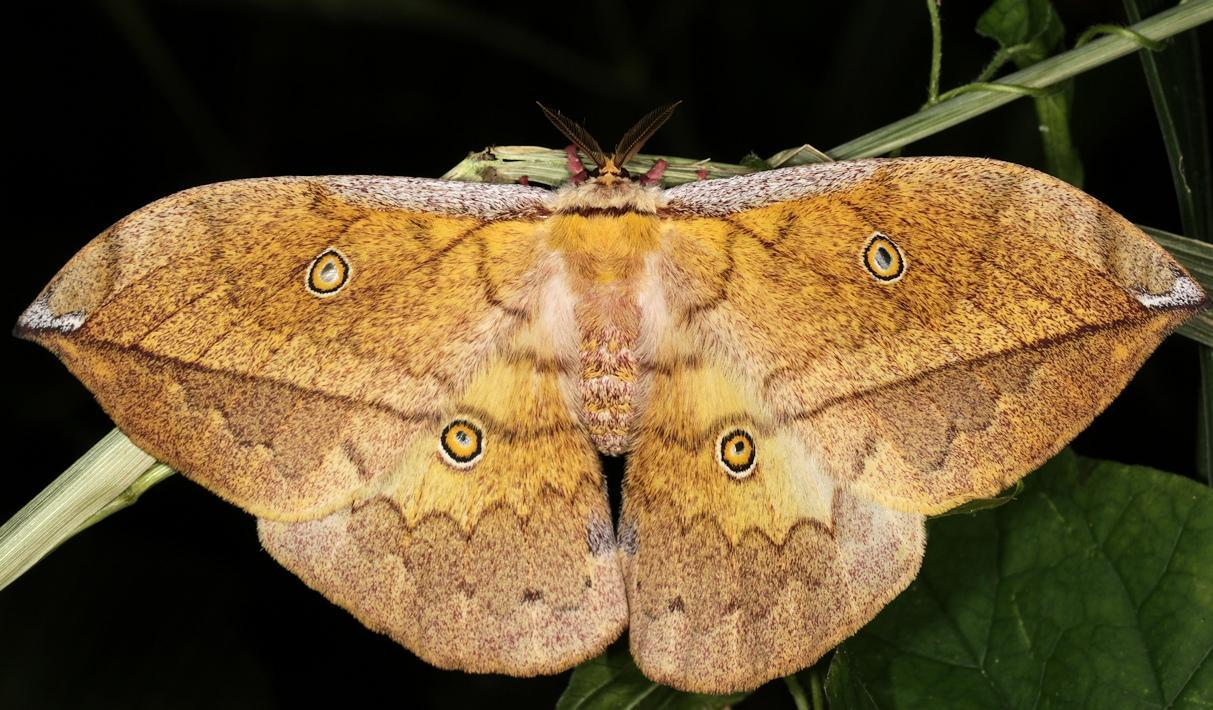
- Pselaphelia flavivitta

Scientific classification
- Kingdom: Animalia
- Phylum: Arthropoda
- Class: Insecta
- Order: Lepidoptera
- Family: Saturniidae
- Subfamily: Saturniinae
- Genus: Pselaphelia; Aurivillius, 1904

= Pselaphelia =

Genus of moths

Pselaphelia is a genus of moths in the family Saturniidae first described by Per Olof Christopher Aurivillius in 1904.

== Species ==
- Pselaphelia antelata Darge, 2003
- Pselaphelia arenivaga Darge, 2003
- Pselaphelia aurata Bouyer, 1992
- Pselaphelia dentifera (Maassen & Weyding, 1885)
- Pselaphelia flavivitta (Walker, 1862)
- Pselaphelia gemmifera (Butler, 1878)
- Pselaphelia hurumai Darge, 2003
- Pselaphelia laclosi Darge, 2002
- Pselaphelia mariaetheresae Darge, 2002
- Pselaphelia neglecta Darge, 2003
- Pselaphelia noellae Bouyer, 2008
- Pselaphelia oremansi Darge, 2008
- Pselaphelia vandenberghei Bouyer, 1992
- Pselaphelia vingerhoedti Bouyer, 2008
