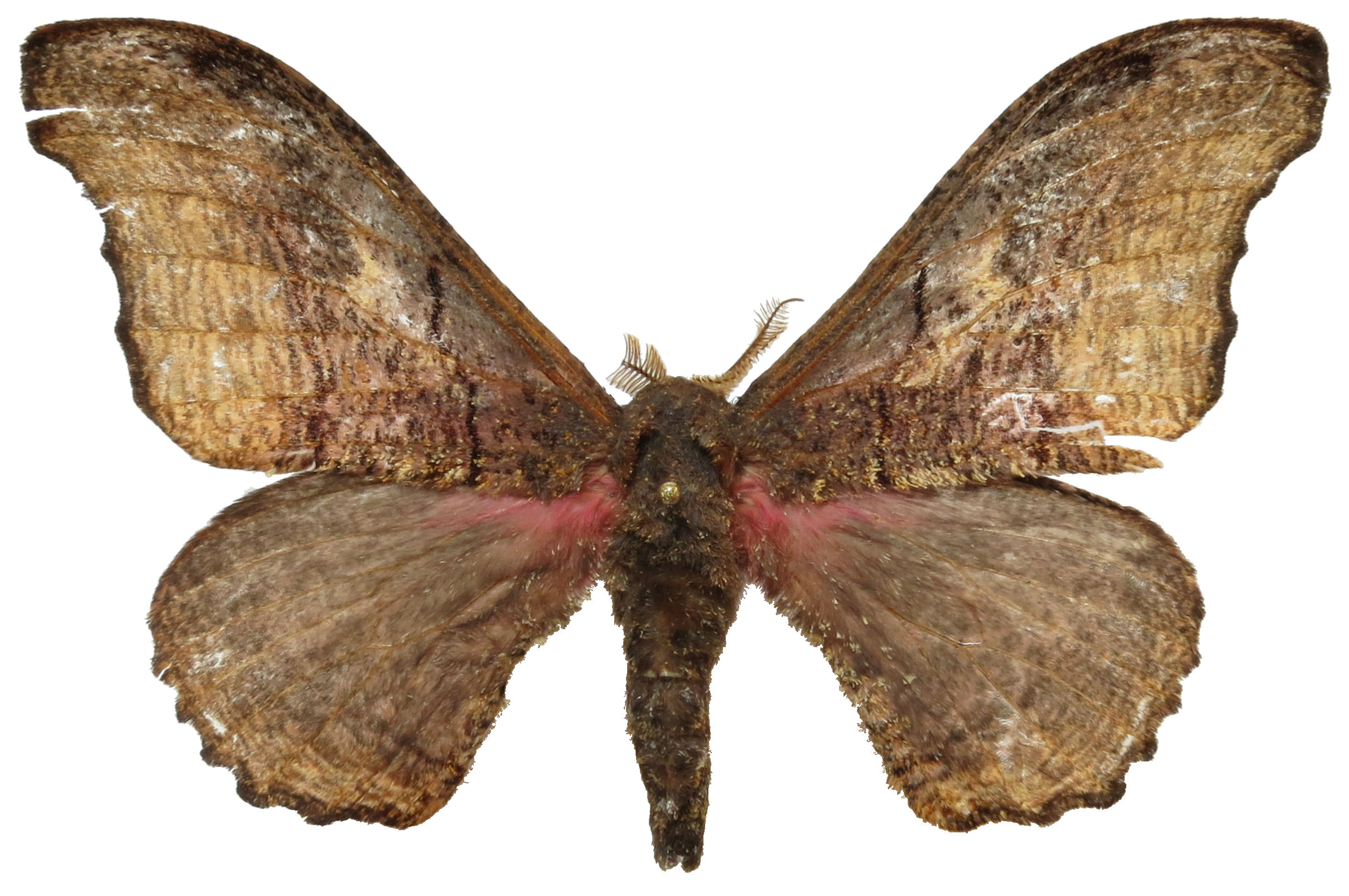
- Microgone ansorgei

Scientific classification
- Kingdom: Animalia
- Phylum: Arthropoda
- Class: Insecta
- Order: Lepidoptera
- Family: Saturniidae
- Subfamily: Saturniinae
- Genus: Micragone; Walker, 1855

= Micragone =

Genus of moths

Micragone is a genus of moths in the family Saturniidae. The genus was erected by Francis Walker in 1855.

== Species ==
- Micragone agathylla (Westwood, 1849)
- Micragone allardi Darge, 1990
- Micragone ansorgei (Rothschild, 1907)
- Micragone bilineata (Rothschild, 1907)
- Micragone camerunensis (Strand, 1909)
- Micragone cana Aurivillius, 1893
- Micragone colettae Rougeot, 1959
- Micragone ducorpsi (Fleury, 1924)
- Micragone elisabethae Bouvier, 1930
- Micragone flammostriata Rougeot, 1979
- Micragone gaetani Bouyer, 2008
- Micragone herilla (Westwood, 1849)
- Micragone joiceyi Bouvier, 1930
- Micragone leonardi Bouyer, 2008
- Micragone lichenodes (Holland, 1893)
- Micragone martinae Rougeot, 1952
- Micragone mirei Darge, 1990
- Micragone morettoi Darge, 2001
- Micragone morini Rougeot, 1977
- Micragone nenia (Westwood, 1849)
- Micragone nenioides Rougeot, 1979
- Micragone neonubifera Rougeot, 1979
- Micragone nubifera Rougeot, 1979
- Micragone nyasae Rougeot, 1962
- Micragone remota Darge, 2005
- Micragone rougeriei Bouyer, 2008
- Micragone trefurthi (Strand, 1909)
