= Solus (moth) =

Scientific classification
- Kingdom: Animalia
- Phylum: Arthropoda
- Class: Insecta
- Order: Lepidoptera
- Family: Saturniidae
- Subfamily: Saturniinae
- Genus: Solus; Watson, 1913

Genus of moths

Solus is a genus of moths in the family Saturniidae first described by Watson in 1913.

== Species ==
- Solus drepanoides (Moore, 1866) - Photos here
- Solus parvifenestratus (Bryk, 1944) - Photos here
