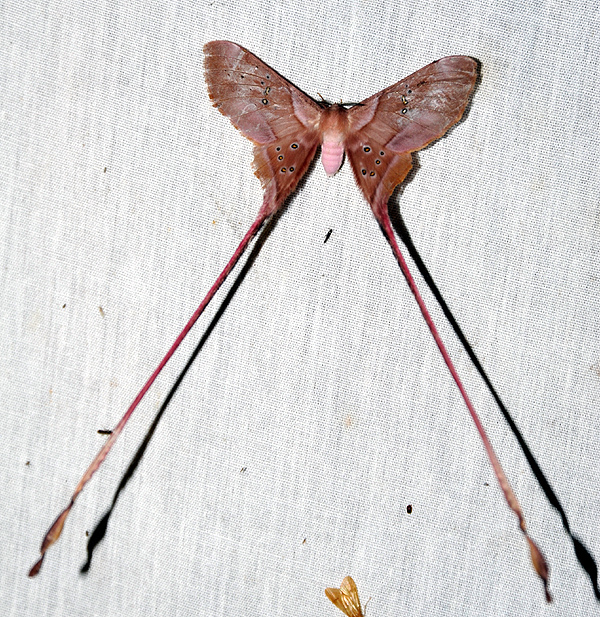

Scientific classification
- Kingdom: Animalia
- Phylum: Arthropoda
- Class: Insecta
- Order: Lepidoptera
- Family: Saturniidae
- Genus: Eudaemonia
- Species: E. troglophylla

Binomial name
- Eudaemonia troglophylla Hampson, 1919

Synonyms
- Eudaemonia colini Bouvier, 1927; Eudaemonia ghesquieri Talbot, 1926; Eustera pohli Dufrane, 1953

= Eudaemonia troglophylla =

Species of moth

Eudaemonia troglophylla is a species of moth in the family Saturniidae. It is found in Angola, the Democratic Republic of Congo, Equatorial Guinea, the Central African Republic, Nigeria, and Gabon.

== Subspecies ==
- Eudaemonia trogophylla trogophylla
- Eudaemonia trogophylla hartfordi (Rougeot, 1962)
