= Vegetia ducalis =

Scientific classification
- Domain: Eukaryota
- Kingdom: Animalia
- Phylum: Arthropoda
- Class: Insecta
- Order: Lepidoptera
- Family: Saturniidae
- Genus: Vegetia
- Species: V. ducalis

Binomial name
- Vegetia ducalis Jordan, 1922

Species of moth

Vegetia ducalis, the ducal princeling, is a species of moth in the family Saturniidae. It was described by Karl Jordan in 1922. It is found in South Africa.

The larvae feed on Eriocephalus umbellatus and Eriosema species.
