= Adafroptilum =

Scientific classification
- Domain: Eukaryota
- Kingdom: Animalia
- Phylum: Arthropoda
- Class: Insecta
- Order: Lepidoptera
- Family: Saturniidae
- Subfamily: Saturniinae
- Tribe: Micragonini
- Genus: Adafroptilum; Darge, 2004

Synonyms
- Afroptilum Darge, 2003 (Preocc.)

Genus of moths

Adafroptilum is a genus of moths in the family Saturniidae first described by Philippe Darge in 2004.

== Species ==
- Adafroptilum acuminatum (Darge, 2003)
- Adafroptilum acutum (Darge, Naumann & Brosch, 2003)
- Adafroptilum austriorientale Darge, 2008
- Adafroptilum bellum (Darge, Naumann & Brosch, 2003)
- Adafroptilum coloratum (Darge, Naumann & Brosch, 2003)
- Adafroptilum convictum Darge, 2007
- Adafroptilum hausmanni Darge, 2007
- Adafroptilum incanum (Sonthonnax, 1899)
- Adafroptilum indivisum (Darge, 2003)
- Adafroptilum kitongaensis Darge, 2006
- Adafroptilum lejorai Darge, 2005
- Adafroptilum mikessensis Darge, 2007
- Adafroptilum occidaneum Darge, 2008
- Adafroptilum permixtum (Darge, 2003)
- Adafroptilum quinquevitreatum Darge, 2005
- Adafroptilum rotundum (Darge, 2003)
- Adafroptilum rougerii Darge, 2006
- Adafroptilum scheveni (Darge, 2003)
- Adafroptilum schmiti Darge, 2005
- Adafroptilum septiguttata (Weymer, 1903)
- Adafroptilum singularum (Darge, Naumann & Brosch, 2003)
- Adafroptilum sommereri Darge, 2005
- Adafroptilum tricoronatum (Darge, Naumann & Brosch, 2003)
- Adafroptilum tuberculatum (Darge, Naumann & Brosch, 2003)
