= Decachorda pomona =

Scientific classification
- Kingdom: Animalia
- Phylum: Arthropoda
- Clade: Pancrustacea
- Class: Insecta
- Order: Lepidoptera
- Family: Saturniidae
- Genus: Decachorda
- Species: D. pomona

Binomial name
- Decachorda pomona (Weymer, 1892)

Synonyms
- Dreata pomona Weymer, 1892

Species of moth

Decachorda pomona is a species of moth of the family Saturniidae first described by Gustav Weymer in 1892. It is known from central and eastern Africa.

This species has a body length of 19 millimetres (0.75 in), the length of the forewings is 24 millimetres (0.94 in). The forewings are reddish yellow with a white spot surrounded by brown in the middle. A fine brown line crosses its forewing.
