= Vegetia legraini =

Scientific classification
- Domain: Eukaryota
- Kingdom: Animalia
- Phylum: Arthropoda
- Class: Insecta
- Order: Lepidoptera
- Family: Saturniidae
- Genus: Vegetia
- Species: V. legraini

Binomial name
- Vegetia legraini Bouyer, 2004

Species of moth

Vegetia legraini is a species of moth in the family Saturniidae. It was described by Thierry Bouyer in 2004. It is found in Namibia.
