= Antistathmoptera =

Scientific classification
- Kingdom: Animalia
- Phylum: Arthropoda
- Class: Insecta
- Order: Lepidoptera
- Family: Saturniidae
- Subfamily: Saturniinae
- Genus: Antistathmoptera; Tams, 1935

Species
- See text

Genus of moths

Antistathmoptera is a genus of moths in the family Saturniidae first described by Tams in 1935.

== Species ==
The genus includes the following species:

- Antistathmoptera daltonae Tams, 1935
- Antistathmoptera elegans Darge, 2015
