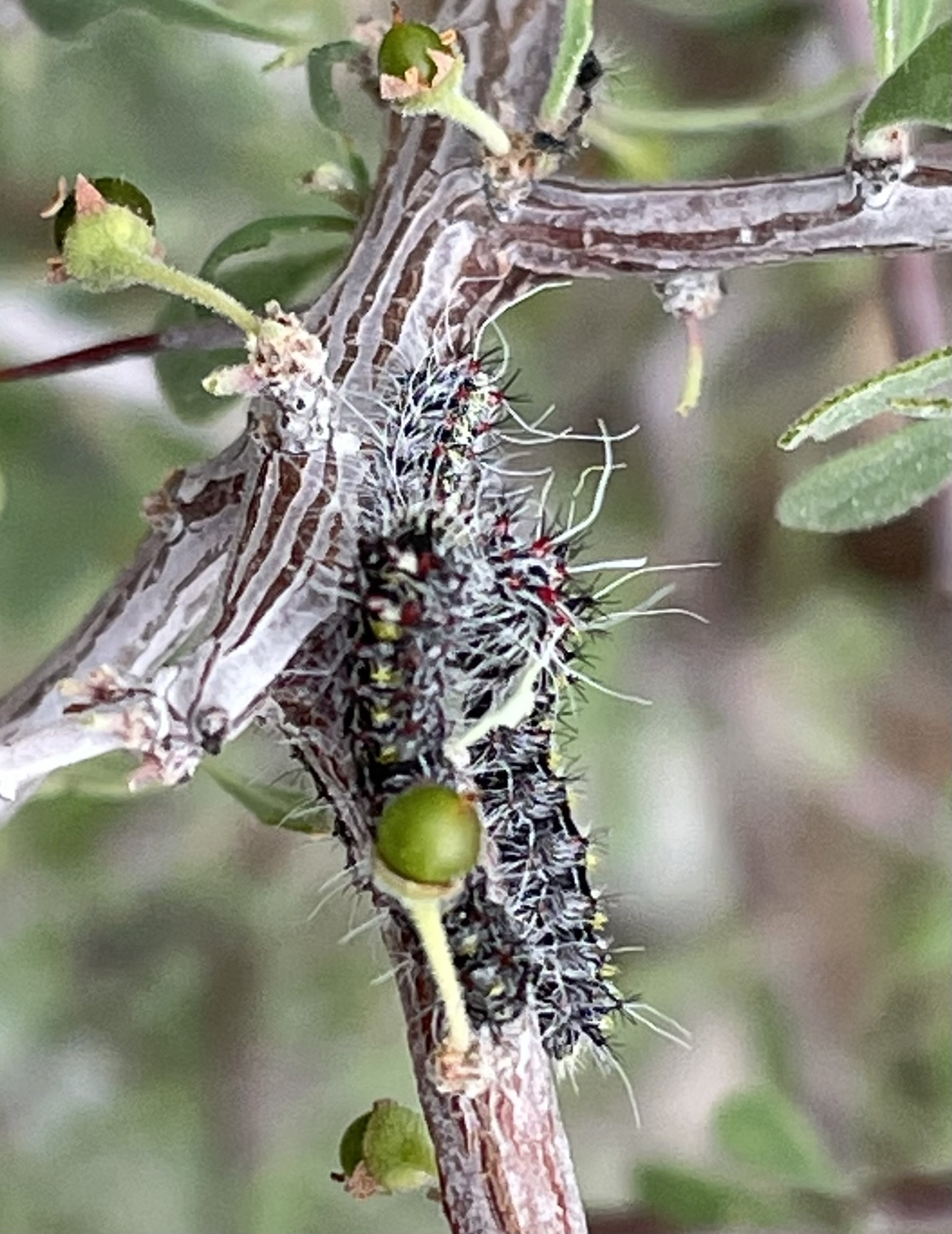

Scientific classification
- Kingdom: Animalia
- Phylum: Arthropoda
- Class: Insecta
- Order: Lepidoptera
- Family: Saturniidae
- Genus: Agapema
- Species: A. anona

Binomial name
- Agapema anona (Ottolengui, 1903)

= Agapema anona =

Species of moth

Agapema anona, commonly known as the greasewood silkmoth or Mexican agapema, is a species of giant silkmoth in the family Saturniidae.

The MONA or Hodges number for Agapema anona is 7754.1.

== Habitat ==
Agapema anona inhabits southern Arizona, Texas, and New Mexico, spreading into northern Mexico. Habitat has been described as being plains, plateaus, desert foothills, arroyos, and alluvial fans.

== Host plants ==
The larvae of Agapema anona feed on plants in the Condalia genus, mainly the knife-leaf condalia, green snakewood, and javelina bush. The adults, as with all Saturniidae species, do not feed.

== Subspecies ==
Three subspecies belong to the species Agapema anona:

- Agapema anona anona (Ottolengui, 1903) 7754.1
- Agapema anona dyari (Cockerell, 1914) 7754.2
- Agapema anona platensis (Peigler & Kendall, 1993) 7754.3
