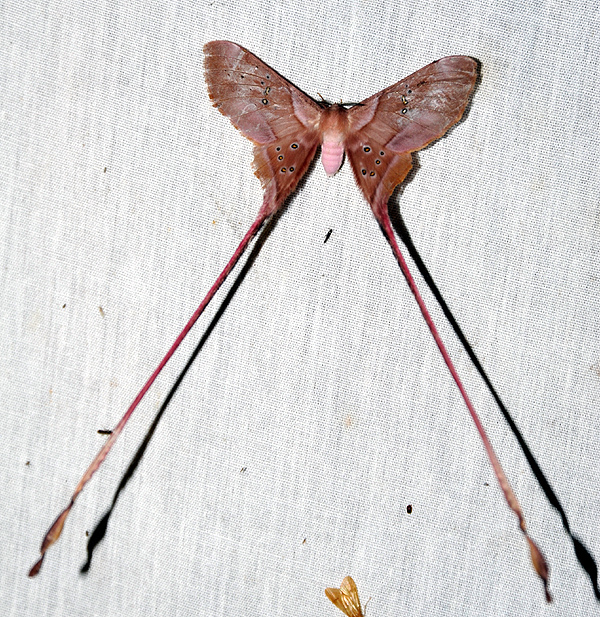
- Eudaemonia troglophylla

Scientific classification
- Kingdom: Animalia
- Phylum: Arthropoda
- Class: Insecta
- Order: Lepidoptera
- Family: Saturniidae
- Subfamily: Saturniinae
- Genus: Eudaemonia; Hübner, 1819

Type species
- Eudaemonia argus (Fabricius, 1781)

Synonyms
- Eustera Duncan & Westwood, 1841

= Eudaemonia (moth) =

Genus of moths

Eudaemonia is a genus of moths in the family Saturniidae. They are native to Sub-Saharan Africa and have remarkable, extremely elongated "tails" on the hindwings.

== Species ==
The genus includes the following species:

- Eudaemonia argiphontes Maassen, 1877
- Eudaemonia argus (Fabricius, 1777)
- Eudaemonia troglophylla Hampson, 1919
