= Cinabra =

Scientific classification
- Kingdom: Animalia
- Phylum: Arthropoda
- Class: Insecta
- Order: Lepidoptera
- Family: Saturniidae
- Subfamily: Saturniinae
- Genus: Cinabra; Sonthonnax, 1901

Genus of moths

Cinabra is a genus of moths in the family Saturniidae first described by Léon Sonthonnax in 1901.

== Species ==
- Cinabra bracteata (Distant, 1897)
- Cinabra hyperbius (Westwood, 1881)
- Cinabra kitalei Bouvier, 1930
