= Eosia =

Scientific classification
- Kingdom: Animalia
- Phylum: Arthropoda
- Class: Insecta
- Order: Lepidoptera
- Family: Saturniidae
- Subfamily: Saturniinae
- Genus: Eosia; Le Cerf, 1911

Genus of moths

Eosia is a genus of moths in the family Saturniidae first described by Ferdinand Le Cerf in 1911.

== Species ==
- Eosia insignis Le Cerf, 1911
