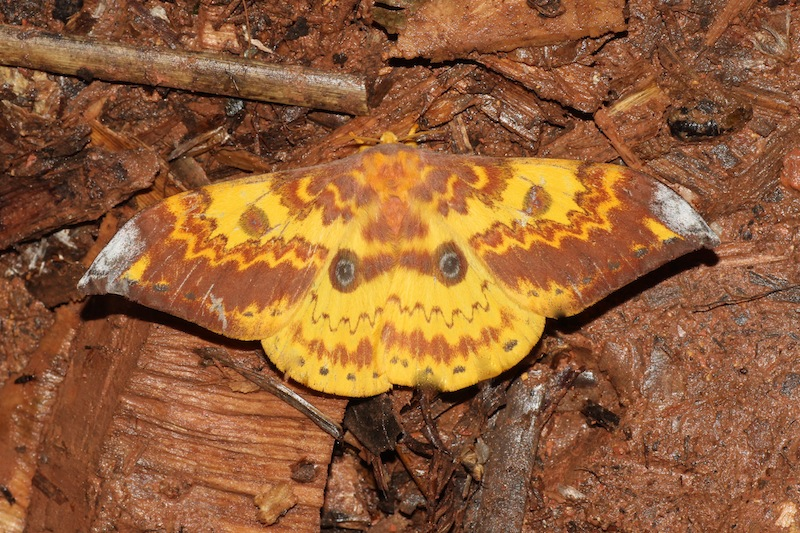

Scientific classification
- Kingdom: Animalia
- Phylum: Arthropoda
- Clade: Pancrustacea
- Class: Insecta
- Order: Lepidoptera
- Family: Saturniidae
- Subfamily: Saturniinae
- Genus: Lemaireia; Nässig & Holloway, 1987

Species
- See text

= Lemaireia =

Genus of moths

Lemaireia is a genus of moths from the family Saturniidae, commonly known as moon moths.

Small oriental genus consisting of 8 orange-marked yellow species, reviewed by Nassig & Holloway (in press). Diagnostic features are: uniformity, rather than asymmetry, of the rings of the ocelli; an undivided, dorsally domed uncus in the male genitalia; a short broad aedeagus with two apical fields of scobination, and a densely and robustly scobinate apex to the conical vesica; strong pouches lateral to the ostium in the female genitalia; a signum consisting of a single spine in the bursa copulatrix.

== Species ==
- Lemaireia chrysopeplus (Toxopeus, 1940)
- Lemaireia hainana Naessig & Wang, 2006
- Lemaireia inexpectata Naessig, 1996
- Lemaireia loepoides (Butler, 1880)
- Lemaireia luteopeplus Naessig & Holloway, 1988
- Lemaireia naessigi Brechlin, 2001
- Lemaireia schintlmeisteri Naessig & Lampe, 1989
