= Agapema solita =

Scientific classification
- Domain: Eukaryota
- Kingdom: Animalia
- Phylum: Arthropoda
- Class: Insecta
- Order: Lepidoptera
- Family: Saturniidae
- Genus: Agapema
- Species: A. solita

Binomial name
- Agapema solita Ferguson, 1972

Species of moth

Agapema solita is a species of giant silkmoth in the family Saturniidae. It was discovered in 1972.
