= Sinobirma =

Scientific classification
- Kingdom: Animalia
- Phylum: Arthropoda
- Class: Insecta
- Order: Lepidoptera
- Family: Saturniidae
- Subfamily: Saturniinae
- Genus: Sinobirma; Bryk, 1944

Genus of moths

Sinobirma is a genus of moths in the family Saturniidae first described by Felix Bryk in 1944.

== Species ==
- Sinobirma malaisei (Bryk, 1944)
