= Antistathmoptera daltonae =

Scientific classification
- Kingdom: Animalia
- Phylum: Arthropoda
- Class: Insecta
- Order: Lepidoptera
- Family: Saturniidae
- Genus: Antistathmoptera
- Species: A. daltonae

Binomial name
- Antistathmoptera daltonae Tams, 1935

Species of moth

Antistathmoptera daltonae is a moth in the family Saturniidae described by Willie Horace Thomas Tams in 1935. It is found in Tanzania, Malawi, Mozambique, South Africa, Zimbabwe and Zambia.

== Subspecies ==
- Antistathmoptera daltonae daltonae (Tanzania)
- Antistathmoptera daltonae granti Bouyer, 2006 (Tanzania)
- Antistathmoptera daltonae rectangulata Pinhey, 1968 (Tanzania, Malawi, Mozambique, South Africa and Zimbabwe)
