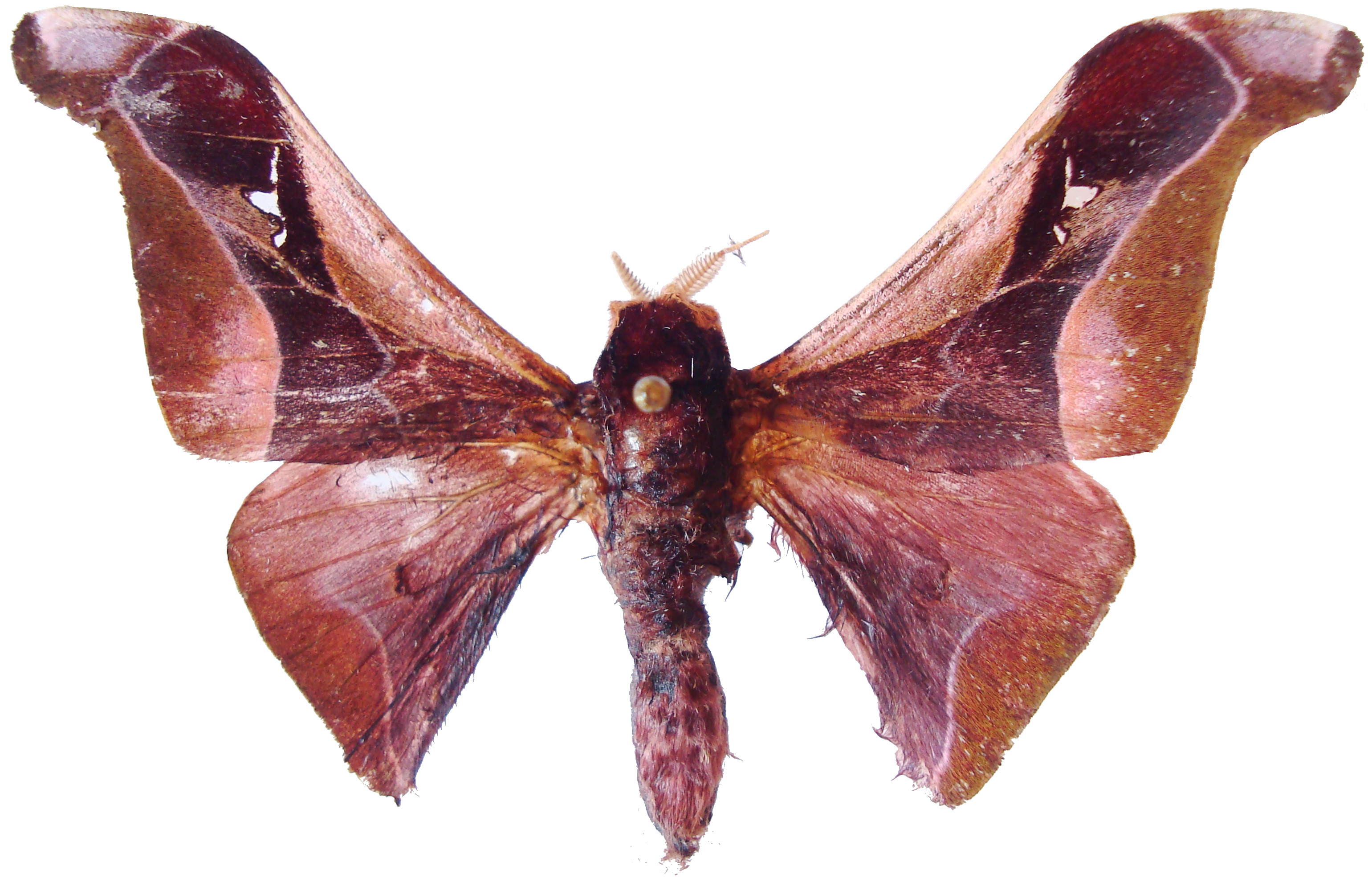
- Holocerina angulata

Scientific classification
- Kingdom: Animalia
- Phylum: Arthropoda
- Class: Insecta
- Order: Lepidoptera
- Family: Saturniidae
- Subfamily: Saturniinae
- Genus: Holocerina; Pinhey, 1956

= Holocerina =

Genus of moths

Holocerina is a genus of moths in the family Saturniidae. The genus was first described by Pinhey in 1956.

== Species ==
- Holocerina agomensis (Karsch, 1893)
- Holocerina angulata (Aurivillius, 1893)
- Holocerina digennariana Darge, 2008
- Holocerina guineensis (Strand, 1912)
- Holocerina intermedia Rougeot, 1978
- Holocerina istsariensis Stoneham, 1962
- Holocerina menieri Rougeot, 1973
- Holocerina micropteryx (Hering, 1949)
- Holocerina nilotica (Jordan, 1922)
- Holocerina occidentalis Bouyer, 2008
- Holocerina orientalis Bouyer, 2001
- Holocerina prosti Rougeot, 1978
- Holocerina rhodesiensis (Janse, 1918)
- Holocerina rougeoti Bouyer, 1997
- Holocerina smilax (Westwood, 1849)
- Holocerina wensis Rougerie & J. Bouyer, 2005
