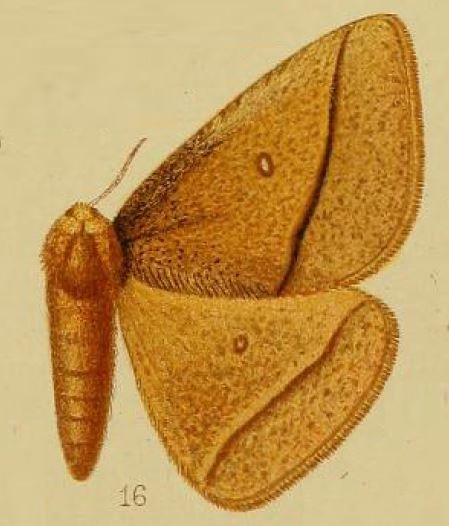
- Decachorda inspersa

Scientific classification
- Kingdom: Animalia
- Phylum: Arthropoda
- Class: Insecta
- Order: Lepidoptera
- Family: Saturniidae
- Subfamily: Saturniinae
- Genus: Decachorda; Aurivillius, 1898

= Decachorda =

Genus of moths

Decachorda is a genus of moths in the family Saturniidae. The genus was erected by Per Olof Christopher Aurivillius in 1898.

== Species ==
- Decachorda aspersa Bouvier, 1927
- Decachorda aurivilii Bouvier, 1930
- Decachorda bouvieri Hering, 1929
- Decachorda congolana Bouvier, 1930
- Decachorda fletcheri Rougeot, 1970
- Decachorda fulvia (Druce, 1886)
- Decachorda inspersa Hampson, 1910
- Decachorda mombasana Stoneham, 1962
- Decachorda pomona Weymer, 1892
- Decachorda rosea Aurivillius, 1898
- Decachorda seydeli Rougeot, 1970
- Decachorda talboti Bouvier, 1930
