= Eudaemonia argiphontes =

Scientific classification
- Kingdom: Animalia
- Phylum: Arthropoda
- Class: Insecta
- Order: Lepidoptera
- Family: Saturniidae
- Genus: Eudaemonia
- Species: E. argiphontes

Binomial name
- Eudaemonia argiphontes Maassen, 1877

Synonyms
- Eudaemonia barnsi Joicey & Talbot, 1924; Eudaemonia batesi Bethune-Baker, 1927

Species of moth

Eudaemonia argiphontes is a species of moth in the family Saturniidae. It is found in Africa, including the Central African Republic, Gabon, Guinea and Equatorial Guinea.
