= Adafroptilum acutum =

Scientific classification
- Domain: Eukaryota
- Kingdom: Animalia
- Phylum: Arthropoda
- Class: Insecta
- Order: Lepidoptera
- Family: Saturniidae
- Genus: Adafroptilum
- Species: A. acutum

Binomial name
- Adafroptilum acutum (Darge, Naumann, & Brosch, 2003)

Species of moth

Adafroptilum acutum is a nocturnal species of moth in the family Saturniidae first described in 2003.
