= Goodia (moth) =

Scientific classification
- Kingdom: Animalia
- Phylum: Arthropoda
- Class: Insecta
- Order: Lepidoptera
- Family: Saturniidae
- Subfamily: Saturniinae
- Tribe: Micragonini
- Genus: Goodia; Holland, 1893

Genus of moths

Goodia is a genus of moths in the family Saturniidae that were first described by William Jacob Holland in 1893.

== Species ==
- Goodia addita Darge, 2008
- Goodia astrica Darge, 1977
- Goodia boulardi Rougeot, 1974
- Goodia canui Bouyer, 2004
- Goodia dimonica Darge, 2008
- Goodia falcata (Aurivillius, 1893)
- Goodia fulvescens Sonthonnax, 1898
- Goodia hierax Jordan, 1922
- Goodia hollandi Butler, 1898
- Goodia lunata Holland, 1893
- Goodia nodulifera (Karsch, 1892)
- Goodia nubilata Holland, 1893
- Goodia obscuripennis Strand, 1913
- Goodia oriens Hampson, 1909
- Goodia oxytela Jordan, 1922
- Goodia pareensis (Darge, 2008)
- Goodia perfulvastra Darge, 1994
- Goodia sentosa Jordan, 1922
- Goodia smithi (Holland, 1892)
- Goodia sparsum (Darge, 2008)
- Goodia stellata Darge, 1994
- Goodia thia Jordan, 1922
- Goodia unguiculata Bouvier, 1936
