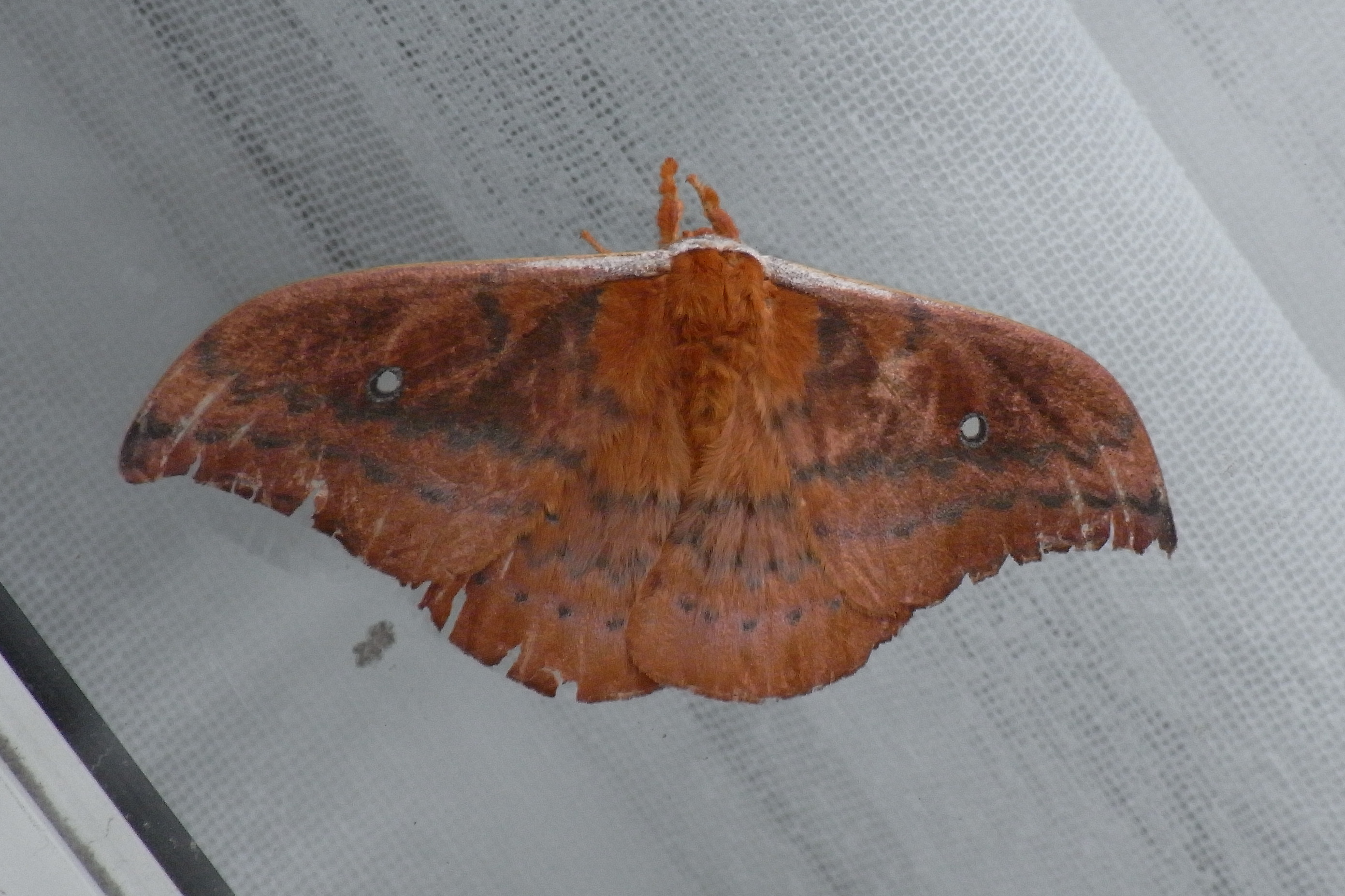

Scientific classification
- Domain: Eukaryota
- Kingdom: Animalia
- Phylum: Arthropoda
- Class: Insecta
- Order: Lepidoptera
- Family: Saturniidae
- Subfamily: Saturniinae
- Genus: Syntherata; Maassen, [1873]

= Syntherata =

Genus of moths

Syntherata is a genus of moths in the family Saturniidae first described by Peter Maassen in 1873.

== Species ==
- Syntherata apicalis Bouvier, 1928
- Syntherata arfakiana Brechlin, 2010
- Syntherata brunnea Eckerlein, 1935
- Syntherata cernyi Brechlin, 2010
- Syntherata doboensis U. & L. Paukstadt, 2004
- Syntherata engaiana Brechlin, 2010
- Syntherata escarlata Lane, Edwards & Naumann, 2010
- Syntherata godeffroyi Butler, 1882
- Syntherata innescens Naumann & Brechlin, 2001
- Syntherata janetta (White, 1843)
- Syntherata lagariana Brechlin, 2010
- Syntherata leonae Lane, 2003
- Syntherata malukuensis U. Paukstadt & L. Paukstadt, 2005
- Syntherata minoris Brechlin, 2010
- Syntherata naessigi Peigler, 1992
- Syntherata okapiana Brechlin, 2010
- Syntherata papuensis Brechlin, 2010
- Syntherata parvoantennata Brechlin, 2010
- Syntherata pristina (Walker, 1865)
- Syntherata rudloffi Brechlin, 2010
- Syntherata sinjaevi Naumann & Brechlin, 2001
