= Eochroa =

Scientific classification
- Kingdom: Animalia
- Phylum: Arthropoda
- Class: Insecta
- Order: Lepidoptera
- Family: Saturniidae
- Subfamily: Saturniinae
- Genus: Eochroa; Felder, 1874
- Species: E. trimenii

Binomial name
- Eochroa trimenii (Felder, 1874)

Genus of moths

Eochroa is a monotypic moth genus in the family Saturniidae erected by Felder in 1874. Its only species, Eochroa trimenii, was also described by Felder in the same year. They inhabit arid rocky areas and mountain passes in Africa where the host plant grows.

== Description ==
It is a small (wingspan of 65 millimetres or 2.6 inches), bright pink moth with yellow borders and large eyespots on its wings. Males have disproportionately large antennae. Larvae are cream with irregular black stripes and short black spines and feed on various species of Melianthus. Adults appear in autumn.
