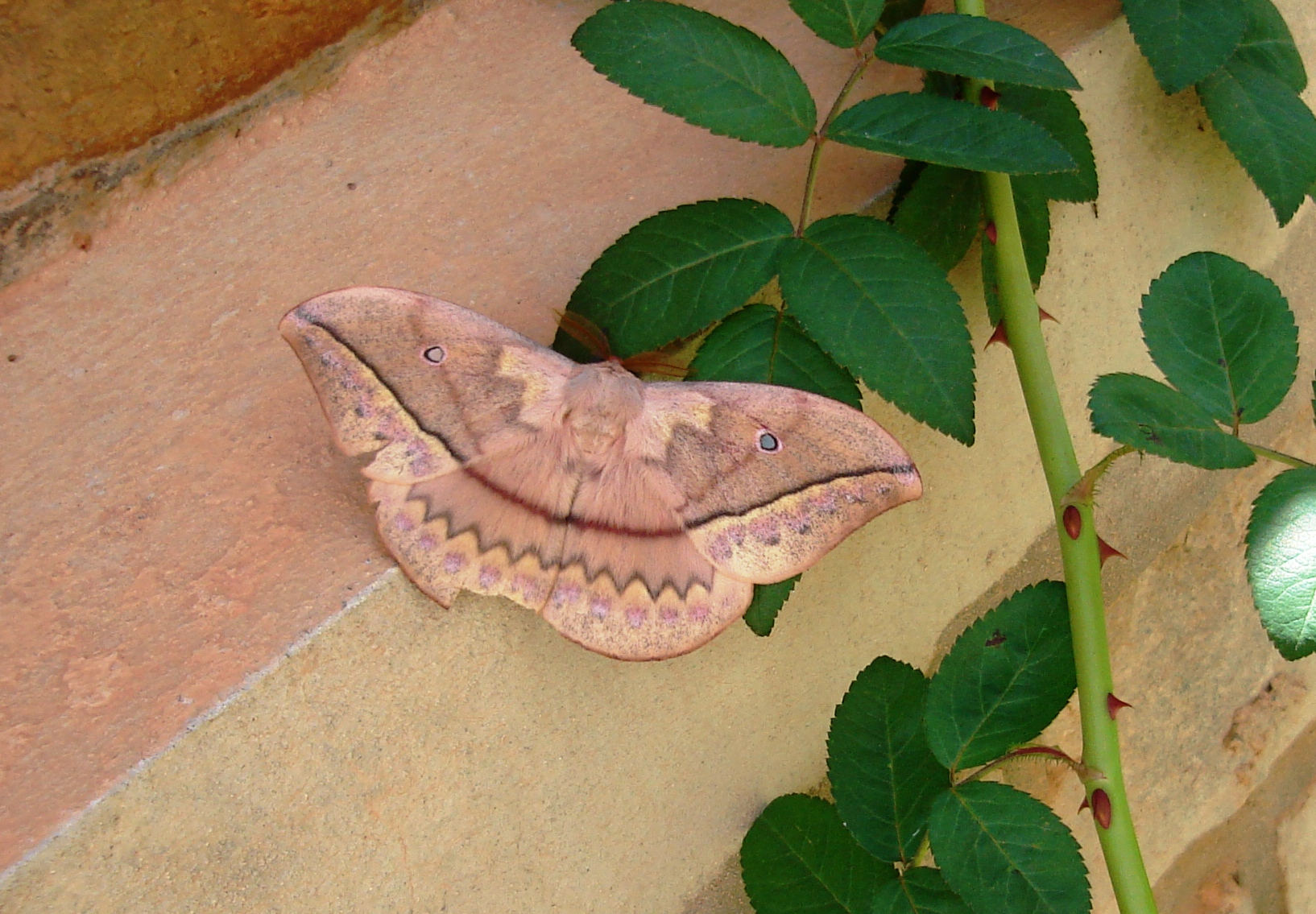
- Maltagorea fusicolor, Madagascar, highlands north of Antananarivo, 12 cm wingspan

Scientific classification
- Domain: Eukaryota
- Kingdom: Animalia
- Phylum: Arthropoda
- Class: Insecta
- Order: Lepidoptera
- Family: Saturniidae
- Genus: Maltagorea; Bouyer, 1993

= Maltagorea =

Genus of moths

Maltagorea is a genus of moths in the family Saturniidae first described by Thierry Bouyer in 1993.

== Species ==
- Maltagorea andriai (Griveaud, 1962)
- Maltagorea ankaratra (Viette, 1954)
- Maltagorea altivola Basquin, 2013
- Maltagorea ambahona Basquin, 2013
- Maltagorea auricolor (Mabille, 1879)
- Maltagorea basquini Rougerie, 2003
- Maltagorea cincta (Mabille, 1879)
- Maltagorea dentata (Griveaud, 1962)
- Maltagorea dubiefi Bouyer, 2006
- Maltagorea dura (Keferstein, 1870)
- Maltagorea fusicolor (Mabille, 1879)
- Maltagorea griveaudi Bouyer, 1996
- Maltagorea madagascariensis (Sonthonnax, 1901)
- Maltagorea monsarrati (Griveaud, 1968)
- Maltagorea ornata (Griveaud, 1962)
- Maltagorea pseudomariae Basquin, 2013
- Maltagorea rostaingi (Griveaud, 1962)
- Maltagorea rubriflava (Griveaud, 1962)
- Maltagorea sogai (Griveaud, 1962)
- Maltagorea vulpina (Butler, 1880)
