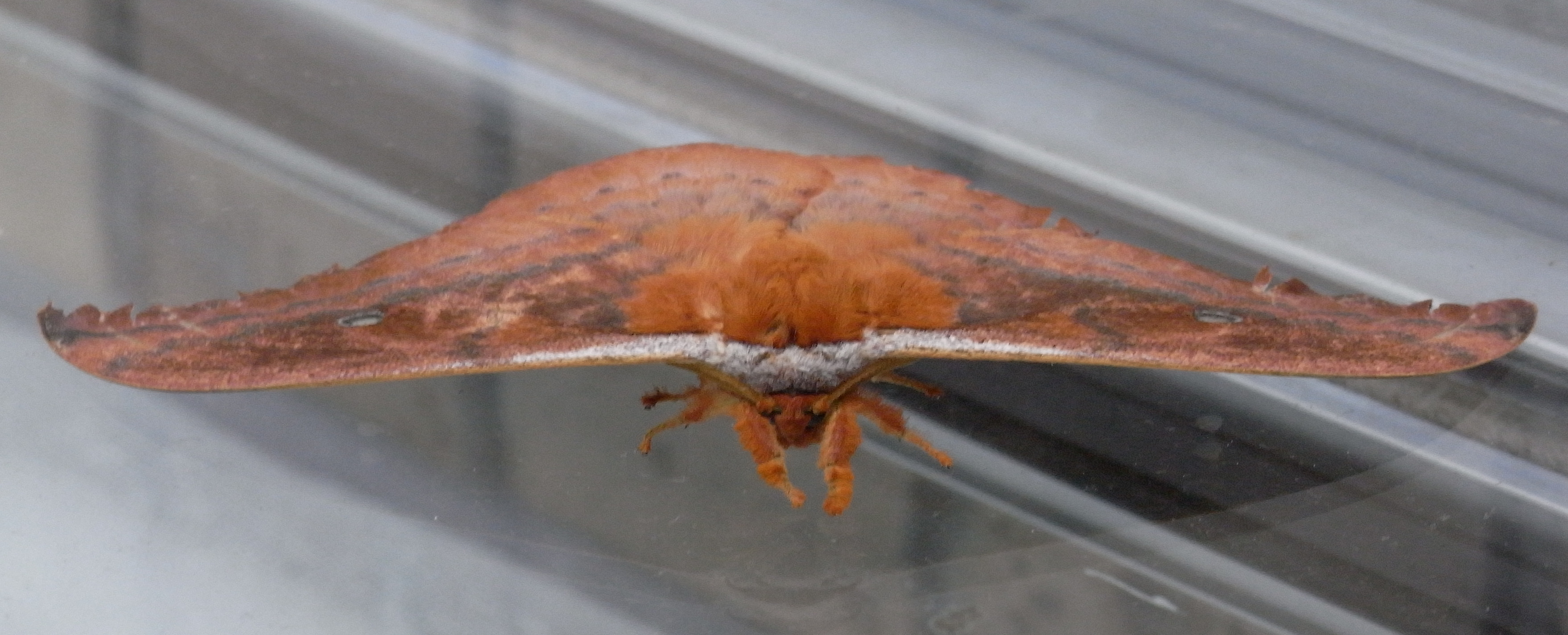

Scientific classification
- Domain: Eukaryota
- Kingdom: Animalia
- Phylum: Arthropoda
- Class: Insecta
- Order: Lepidoptera
- Family: Saturniidae
- Genus: Syntherata
- Species: S. janetta

Binomial name
- Syntherata janetta (White, 1843)

Synonyms
- Saturnia janetta White, 1843; Antheraea janetta (White, 1843); Saturnia melvilla Westwood, 1854; Antheraea purpurascens Walker, 1865; Saturnia purpurascens (Walker, 1865); Synthera brunnea Eckerlein, 1935; Antheraea insignis Walker, 1869; Antheraea disjuncta Walker, 1865; Syntherata weymeri Maasen in Maasen & Weymer, 1873; Syntherata godeffroyi aliena Niepelt, 1934; Syntherata aliena Schüssler, 1934; Syntherata godeffroyi olivacea Niepelt, 1934; Syntherata olivescens Schüssler, 1934; Syntherata sonthonnaxi Schüssler, 1934

= Syntherata janetta =

Species of moth

Syntherata janetta is a moth of the family Saturniidae, commonly known as the emperor moth.

== Description ==
The wingspan is about 120–140 mm (4.7–5.5 in) and variable in color from yellowish to brown or purplish-grey. The wings have zigzag markings, sometimes with dark splotches, and a small circular spot on each wing. The larvae are large greenish spiny caterpillars that feed on various plants, including Euodia elleryana, Geijera salicifolia, Glochidion ferdinandi, Petalostigma quadriloculare, Aegiceras, Ceriops, Timonius rumphii and Podocarpus spinulosus.

== Habitat and range ==
Syntherata janetta are found in heavily forested areas including rainforest in New Guinea and in coastal eastern Australia as far south as Newcastle.

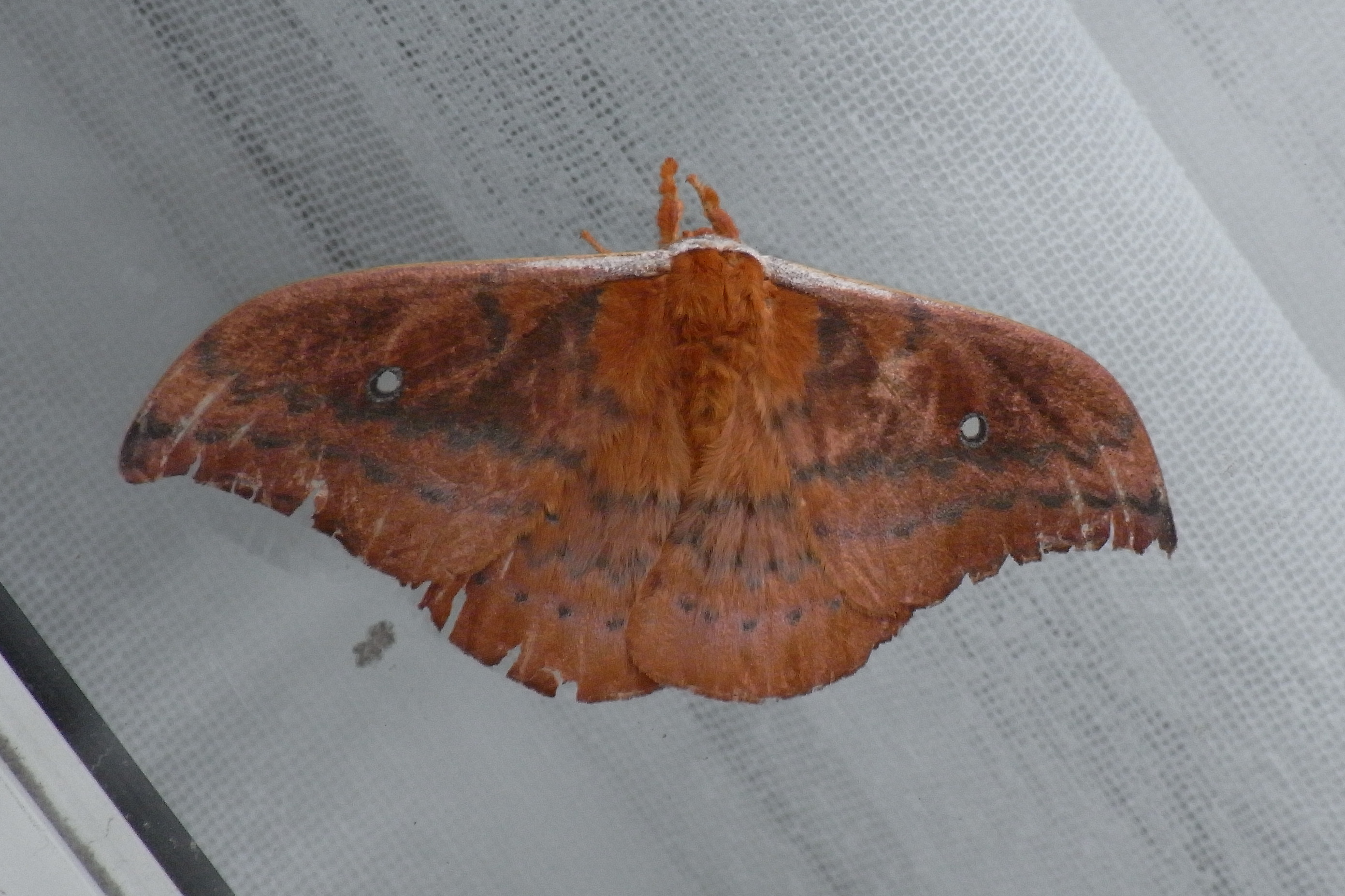
Canungra, Queensland
