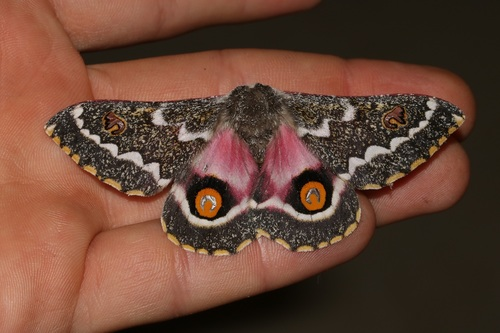
- Vegetia grimmia

Scientific classification
- Domain: Eukaryota
- Kingdom: Animalia
- Phylum: Arthropoda
- Class: Insecta
- Order: Lepidoptera
- Family: Saturniidae
- Tribe: Micragonini
- Genus: Vegetia; Jordan, 1922

= Vegetia =

Genus of moths

Vegetia is a genus of moths in the family Saturniidae first described by Karl Jordan in 1922.

== Species ==
- Vegetia dewitzi (Maassen & Weymer, 1886)
- Vegetia ducalis Jordan, 1922
- Vegetia grimmia (Geyer, 1831)
- Vegetia legraini Bouyer, 2004
