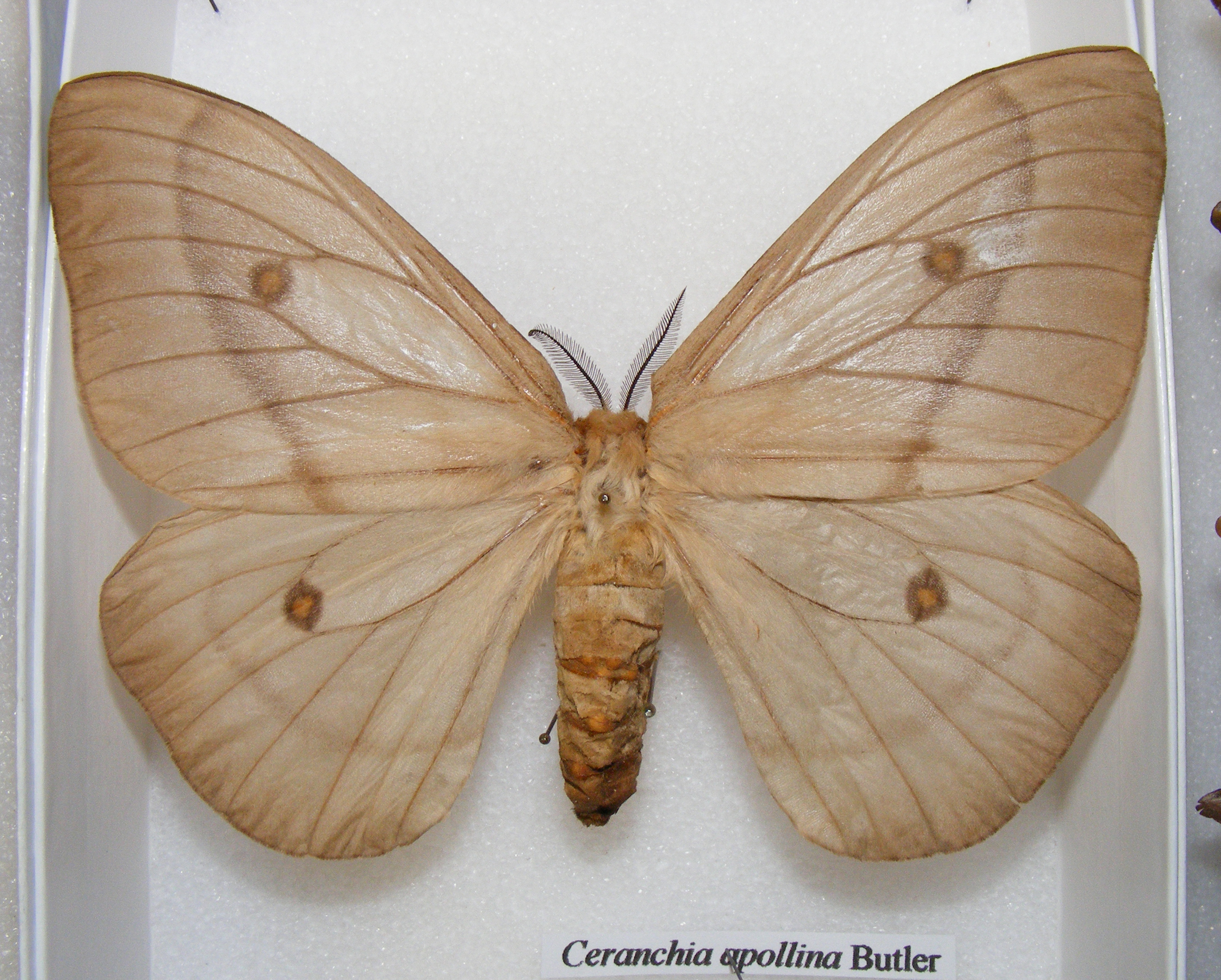
- Ceranchia apollina

Scientific classification
- Kingdom: Animalia
- Phylum: Arthropoda
- Clade: Pancrustacea
- Class: Insecta
- Order: Lepidoptera
- Family: Saturniidae
- Tribe: Saturniini
- Genus: Ceranchia; Butler, 1878

= Ceranchia =

Genus of moths

Ceranchia is a monotypic genus of moths in the family Saturniidae first described by Arthur Gardiner Butler in 1878.

It contains only one species, the ghostly silkmoth (Ceranchia apollina Butler, 1878) endemic to Madagascar. Its diet consists of over 50 different plants, including but not limited to Apocynaceae (the best is Plectaneia thouarsii), Fabaceae, Rutaceae, Meliaceae, and Myrtaceae. This species as most Saturniidae do not feed in their adult stage as their mouths are vestigial.
