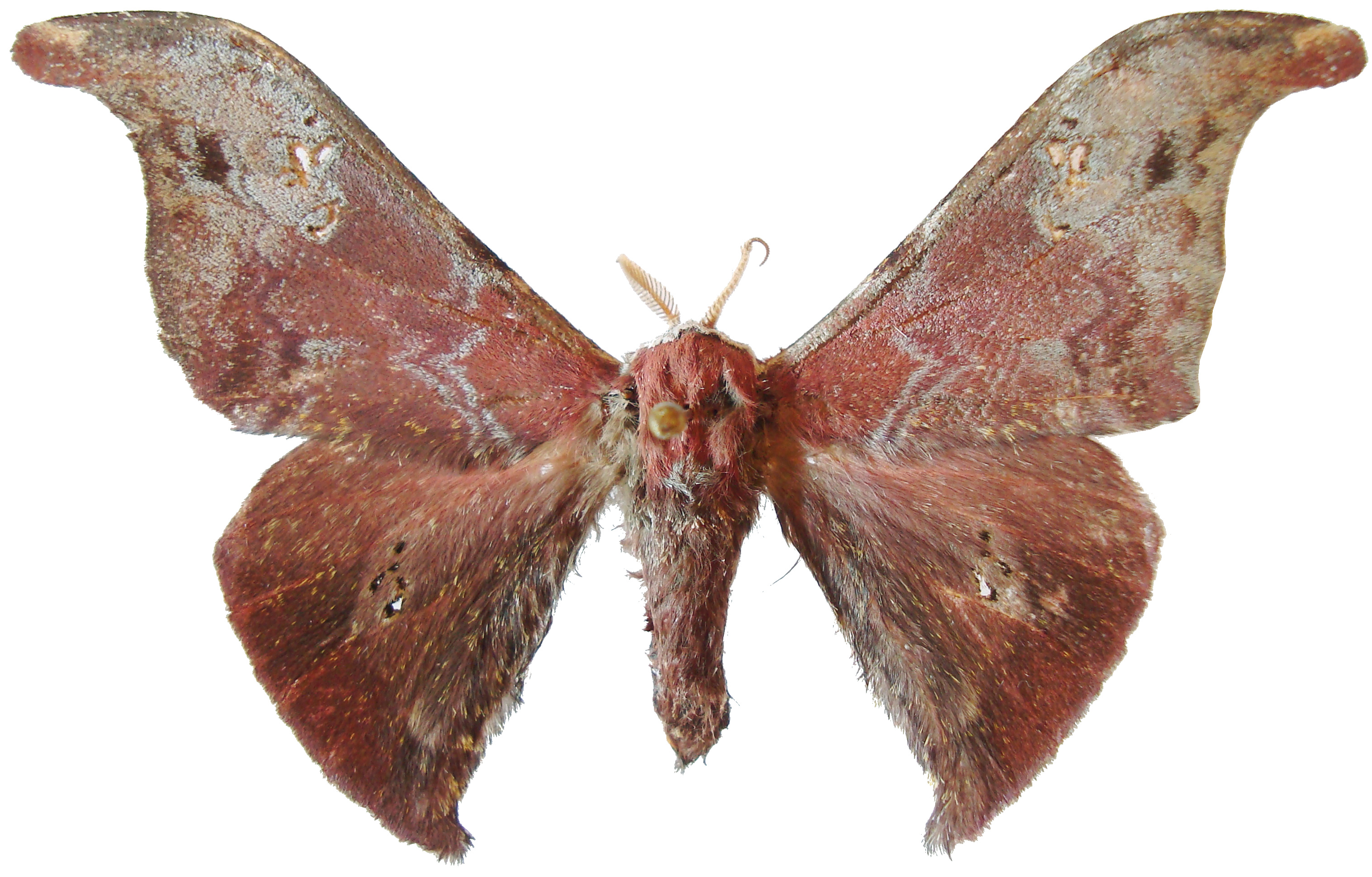
- From Cameroon

Scientific classification
- Kingdom: Animalia
- Phylum: Arthropoda
- Class: Insecta
- Order: Lepidoptera
- Family: Saturniidae
- Subfamily: Saturniinae
- Genus: Carnegia; Holland, 1896

= Carnegia (moth) =

Genus of moths

Carnegia is a genus of moths in the family Saturniidae first described by William Jacob Holland in 1896.

== Species ==
- Carnegia mirabilis (Aurivillius, 1895)
