= Antheraeopsis =

Scientific classification
- Domain: Eukaryota
- Kingdom: Animalia
- Phylum: Arthropoda
- Class: Insecta
- Order: Lepidoptera
- Family: Saturniidae
- Tribe: Saturniini
- Genus: Antheraeopsis; Wood-Mason, 1886

Genus of moths

Antheraeopsis is a genus of moths in the family Saturniidae first described by James Wood-Mason in 1886.

== Species ==
- Antheraeopsis assamensis (Helfer, 1837) – Assam silkmoth, muga silkworm
- Antheraeopsis brunnea van Eecke, 1922
- Antheraeopsis castanea Jordan, 1910
- Antheraeopsis chengtuana Watson, 1923
- Antheraeopsis formosana Sonan, 1937
- Antheraeopsis mezops Bryk, 1944
- Antheraeopsis paniki Naessig & Treadaway, 1998
- Antheraeopsis rubiginea Toxopeus, 1940
- Antheraeopsis rudloffi Brechlin, 2002
- Antheraeopsis subvelata Bouvier, 1930
- Antheraeopsis youngi Watson, 1915
- Antheraeopsis yunnanensis Chu & Wang, 1993
