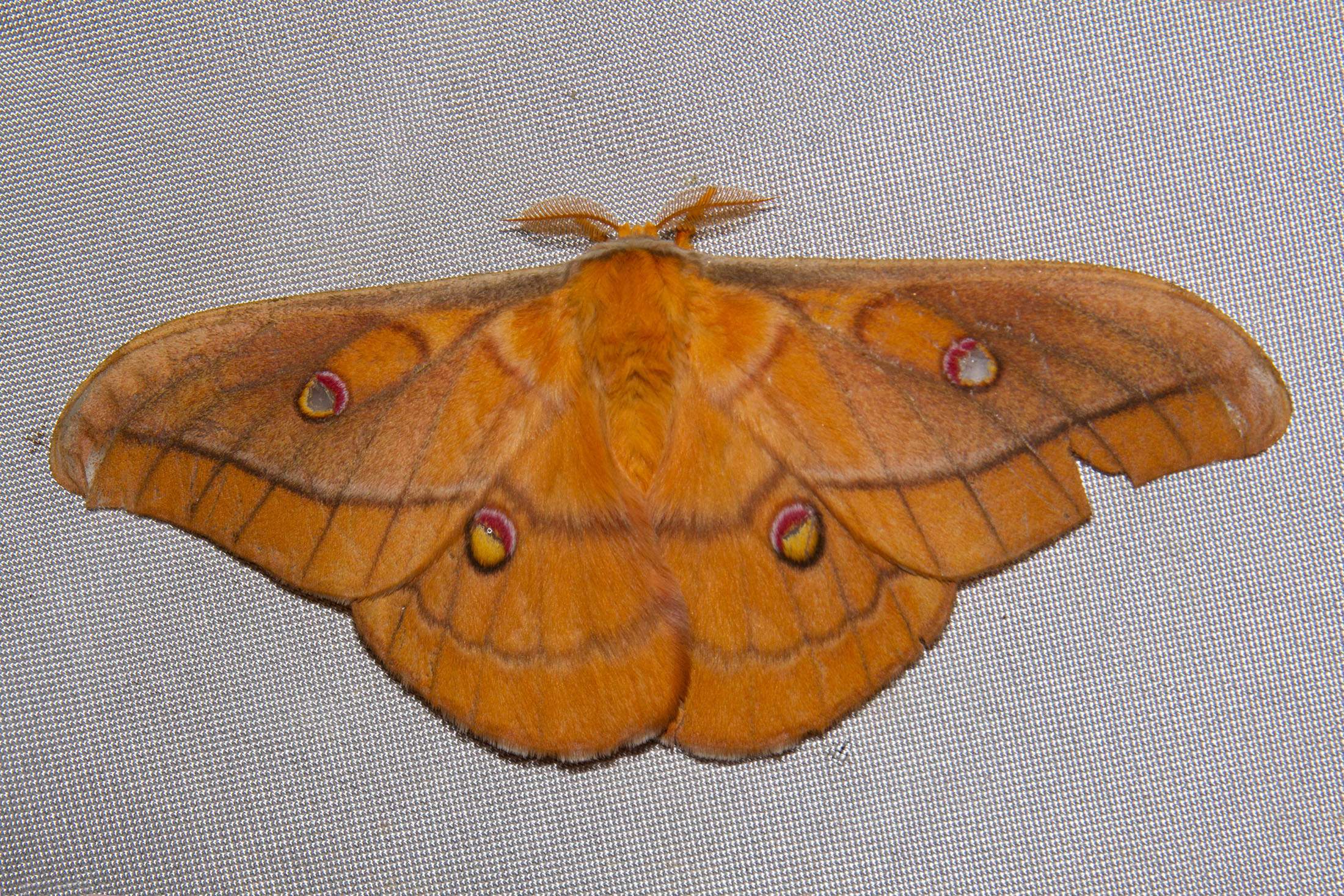

Scientific classification
- Domain: Eukaryota
- Kingdom: Animalia
- Phylum: Arthropoda
- Class: Insecta
- Order: Lepidoptera
- Family: Saturniidae
- Genus: Neodiphthera; D. S. Fletcher, 1982

= Neodiphthera =

Genus of moths

Neodiphthera is a genus of moths in the family Saturniidae. It was described by David Stephen Fletcher in 1982.

== Species ==
- Neodiphthera albicera (Rothschild & Jordan, 1907)
- Neodiphthera aruensis U. Paukstadt, L. Paukstadt & Suhardjono, 2003
- Neodiphthera buruensis Brechlin, 2005
- Neodiphthera ceramensis (Bouvier, 1928)
- Neodiphthera decellei (Lemaire & Naessig, 2002)
- Neodiphthera elleri (Eckerlein, 1935)
- Neodiphthera excavus (Lane, 1995)
- Neodiphthera foucheri (Bouvier, 1928)
- Neodiphthera gazellae (Niepelt, 1934)
- Neodiphthera goodgeri (d`Abrera, 1998)
- Neodiphthera habemana Brechlin, 2005
- Neodiphthera intermedia (Bouvier, 1928)
- Neodiphthera joiceyi (Bouvier, 1928)
- Neodiphthera monacha (Staudinger, 1920)
- Neodiphthera papuana (Rothschild, 1904)
- Neodiphthera rhythmica (Turner, 1936)
- Neodiphthera roicki Brechlin, 2005
- Neodiphthera saccopoea (Turner, 1924)
- Neodiphthera sahulensis U. Paukstadt, L. Paukstadt & Suhardjono, 2003
- Neodiphthera schaarschmidti Brechlin, 2005
- Neodiphthera sciron (Westwood, 1881)
- Neodiphthera strandi (Niepelt, 1934)
- Neodiphthera strigata (Bethune-Baker, 1908)
- Neodiphthera sulphurea (Lane & Naumann, 2003)
- Neodiphthera talboti (Bouvier, 1928)
- Neodiphthera tennenti (Naessig & Lemaire, 2002)
- Neodiphthera venusta (Rothschild & Jordan, 1907)
