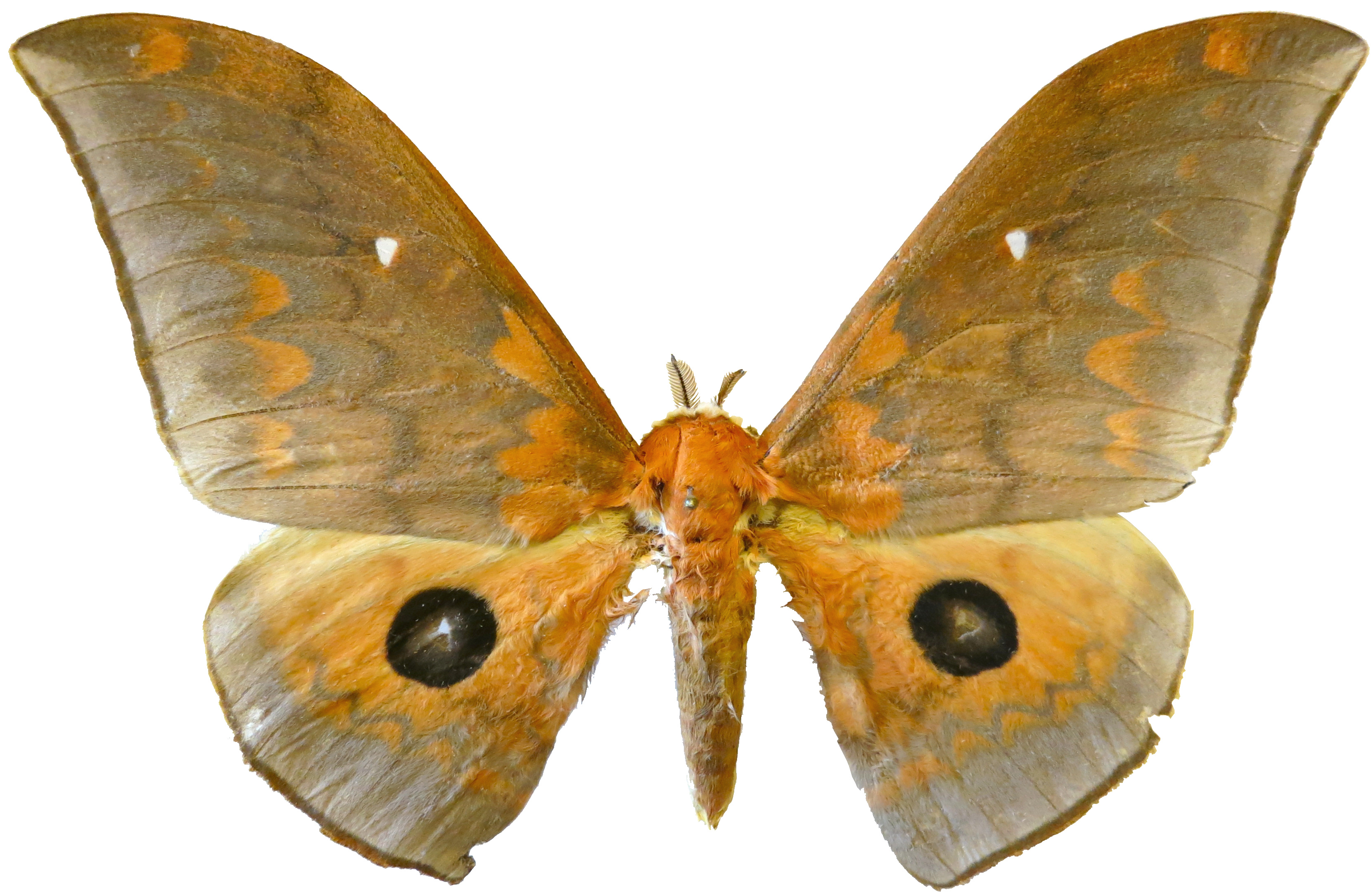
- Pseudobunaea tyrrhena

Scientific classification
- Kingdom: Animalia
- Phylum: Arthropoda
- Class: Insecta
- Order: Lepidoptera
- Family: Saturniidae
- Tribe: Bunaeini
- Genus: Pseudobunaea; Bouvier, 1927

= Pseudobunaea =

Genus of moths

Pseudobunaea is a genus of moths in the family Saturniidae first described by Eugène Louis Bouvier in 1927.

== Species ==
- Pseudobunaea alinda (Drury, 1782)
- Pseudobunaea barnsi Bouvier, 1930
- Pseudobunaea bjornstadi Bouyer, 2006
- Pseudobunaea callista (Jordan, 1910)
- Pseudobunaea cleopatra (Aurivillius, 1893)
- Pseudobunaea cyrene (Weymer, 1909)
- Pseudobunaea dayensis Rougeot, Bourgogne & Laporte, 1991
- Pseudobunaea deaconi Stoneham, 1962
- Pseudobunaea epithyrena (Maassen & Weyding, 1885)
- Pseudobunaea heyeri (Weymer, 1896)
- Pseudobunaea illustris Weymer, 1901
- Pseudobunaea immaculata Bouvier, 1930
- Pseudobunaea inornata (Sonthonnax, 1901)
- Pseudobunaea irius (Fabricius, 1793)
- Pseudobunaea melinde (Maassen & Weyding, 1885)
- Pseudobunaea meloui (Riel, 1910)
- Pseudobunaea morlandi (Rothschild, 1907)
- Pseudobunaea natalensis (Aurivillius, 1893)
- Pseudobunaea orientalis Rougeot, 1972
- Pseudobunaea pallens (Sonthonnax, 1901)
- Pseudobunaea parathyrrhena (Bouvier, 1927)
- Pseudobunaea redlichi (Weymer, 1901)
- Pseudobunaea tyrrhena (Westwood, 1849)
- Pseudobunaea vingerhoedti Bouyer, 2004
