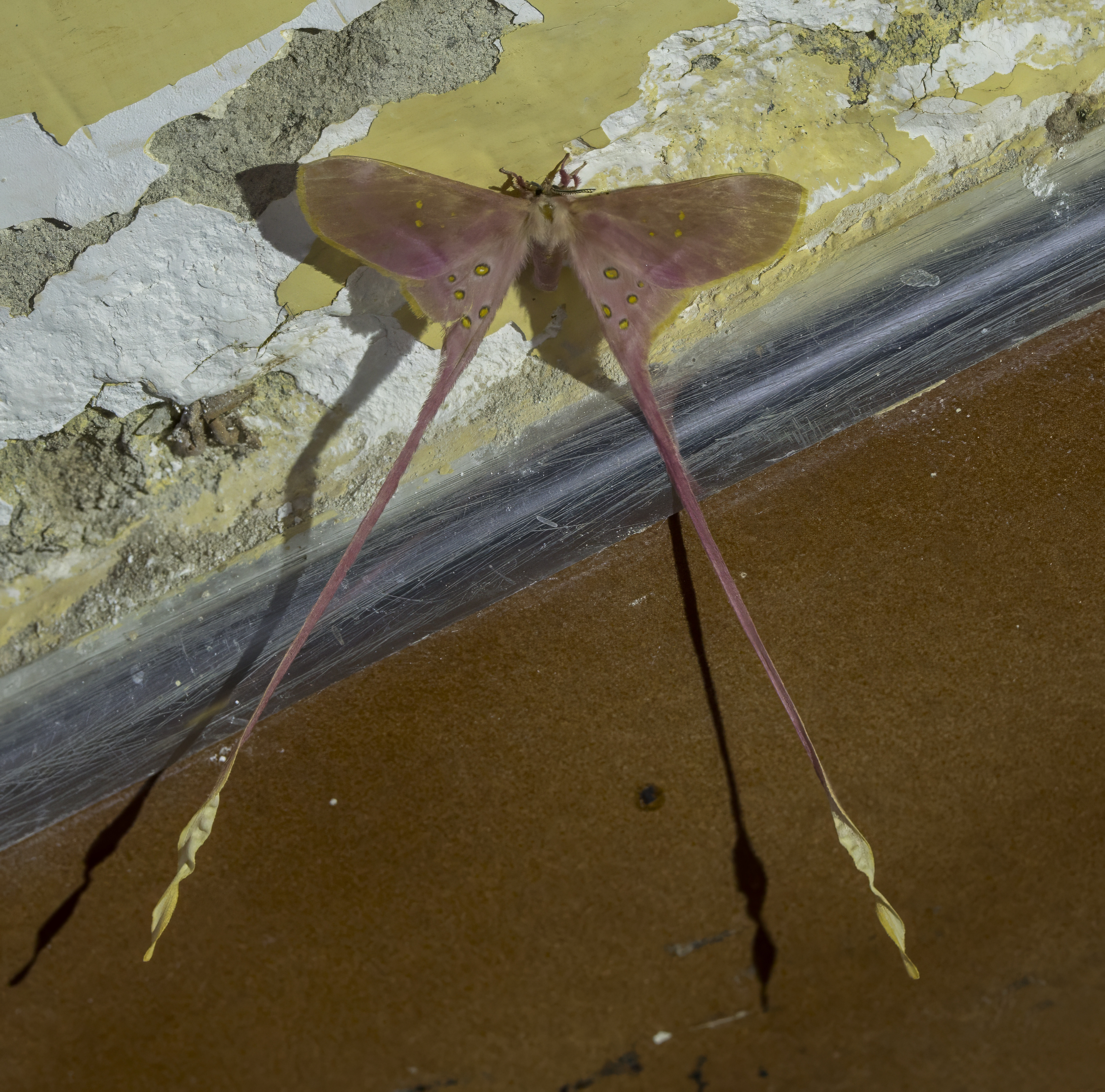
- in Ghana

Scientific classification
- Kingdom: Animalia
- Phylum: Arthropoda
- Class: Insecta
- Order: Lepidoptera
- Family: Saturniidae
- Genus: Eudaemonia
- Species: E. argus

Binomial name
- Eudaemonia argus (Fabricius, 1781)

Synonyms
- Bombyx argus Fabricius, 1781; Phalaena Bombyx brachyura Drury, 1782; Eudaemonia brachyura; Eudaemonia minor Holland, 1920; Eudaemonia uniocellata Testout, 1941; Eudaemonia uroarge Hübner, 1820

= Eudaemonia argus =

Species of moth

Eudaemonia argus is a species of moth in the family Saturniidae. It is found in Africa, in such areas as Cameroon, Congo, DRCongo, Gabon, Ghana, Ivory Coast, Liberia, Nigeria, Sierra Leone, and Togo.
