= Tagoropsis =

Scientific classification
- Domain: Eukaryota
- Kingdom: Animalia
- Phylum: Arthropoda
- Class: Insecta
- Order: Lepidoptera
- Family: Saturniidae
- Subfamily: Saturniinae
- Genus: Tagoropsis; Felder, 1874

Genus of moths

Tagoropsis is a genus of moths in the family Saturniidae first described by Felder in 1874.

== Species ==
- Tagoropsis flavinata (Walker, 1865)
- Tagoropsis genoviefae Rougeot, 1950
- Tagoropsis hanningtoni (Butler, 1883)
- Tagoropsis hecqui Bouyer, 1989
- Tagoropsis rougeoti D. S. Fletcher, 1952
- Tagoropsis sabulosa Rothschild, 1907
