= Melanocera =

Scientific classification
- Domain: Eukaryota
- Kingdom: Animalia
- Phylum: Arthropoda
- Class: Insecta
- Order: Lepidoptera
- Family: Saturniidae
- Tribe: Bunaeini
- Genus: Melanocera; Sonthonnax, 1901

Genus of moths

Melanocera is a genus of moths in the family Saturniidae first described by Léon Sonthonnax in 1901.

== Species ==
- Melanocera dargei Terral, 1991
- Melanocera menippe (Westwood, 1849)
- Melanocera nereis (Rothschild, 1898)
- Melanocera parva Rothschild, 1907
- Melanocera pinheyi Lemaire & Rougeot, 1974
- Melanocera pujoli Lemaire & Rougeot, 1974
- Melanocera sufferti (Weymer, 1896)
- Melanocera widenti Terral & Darge, 1991
