= Leucopteryx =

Scientific classification
- Kingdom: Animalia
- Phylum: Arthropoda
- Clade: Pancrustacea
- Class: Insecta
- Order: Lepidoptera
- Family: Saturniidae
- Tribe: Bunaeini
- Genus: Leucopteryx; Packard, 1901

Genus of moths

Leucopteryx is a genus of moths in the family Saturniidae first described by Packard in 1901.

== Species ==
- Leucopteryx ansorgei (Rothschild, 1897)
- Leucopteryx mollis (Butler, 1889)
