= Ubaena =

Scientific classification
- Kingdom: Animalia
- Phylum: Arthropoda
- Class: Insecta
- Order: Lepidoptera
- Family: Saturniidae
- Tribe: Bunaeini
- Genus: Ubaena; Karsch, 1900

Genus of moths

Ubaena is a genus of moths in the family Saturniidae first described by Ferdinand Karsch in 1900.

== Species ==
- Ubaena dolabella (Druce, 1886)
- Ubaena fuelleborniana Karsch, 1900
- Ubaena lequeuxi Darge & Terral, 1988
- Ubaena periculosa Darge & Terral, 1988
- Ubaena sabunii Darge & Kilumile, 2004
