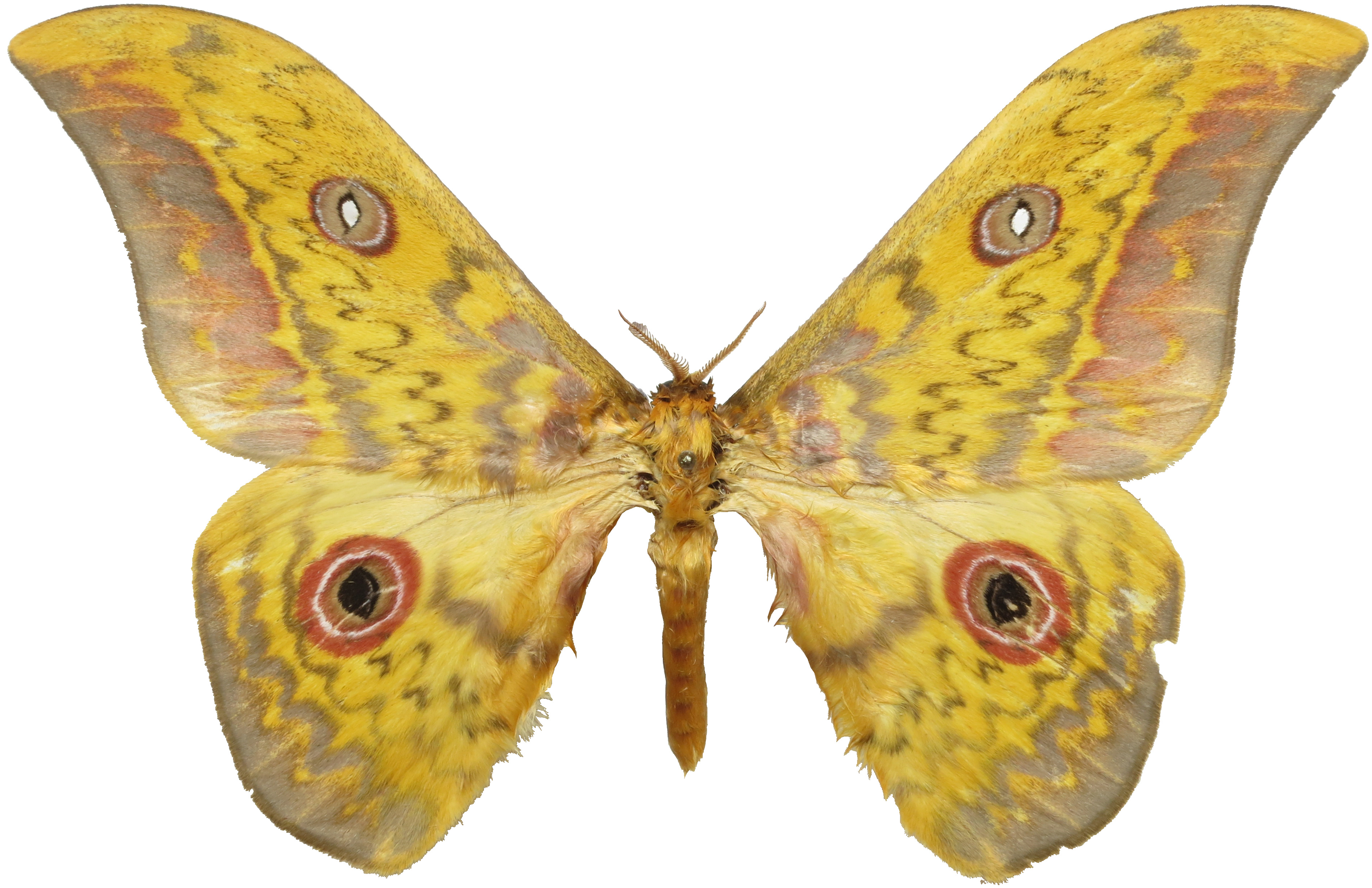
- Aurivillius triramis

Scientific classification
- Kingdom: Animalia
- Phylum: Arthropoda
- Class: Insecta
- Order: Lepidoptera
- Family: Saturniidae
- Subfamily: Saturniinae
- Genus: Aurivillius; Packard, 1902

= Aurivillius (moth) =

Genus of moths

Aurivillius is a genus of moths in the family Saturniidae first described by Alpheus Spring Packard in 1902. They occur in Sub-Saharan Africa.

== Species ==
- Aurivillius aratus (Westwood, 1849)
- Aurivillius cadioui Bouyer, 2008
- Aurivillius drumonti Bouyer, 2008
- Aurivillius horsini Bouvier, 1927
- Aurivillius jolyanorum Bouyer, 1999
- Aurivillius oberthuri Bouvier, 1927
- Aurivillius seydeli Rougeot, 1966
- Aurivillius triramis Rothschild, 1907
