= Ludia (moth) =

Scientific classification
- Kingdom: Animalia
- Phylum: Arthropoda
- Class: Insecta
- Order: Lepidoptera
- Family: Saturniidae
- Subfamily: Saturniinae
- Genus: Ludia; Wallengren, 1865

Genus of moths

Ludia is a genus of moths in the family Saturniidae. It was first described by Hans Daniel Johan Wallengren in 1865.

== Species ==
- Ludia arguta Jordan, 1922
- Ludia arida Jordan, 1938
- Ludia corticea Jordan, 1922
- Ludia delegorguei (Boisduval, 1847)
- Ludia dentata (Hampson, 1891)
- Ludia goniata Rothschild, 1907
- Ludia hansali Felder, 1874
- Ludia jordani Bouyer, 1997
- Ludia leonardo Stoneham, 1962
- Ludia monroei Jordan, 1938
- Ludia obscura Aurivillius, 1893
- Ludia orinoptena Karsch, 1893
- Ludia pseudovetusta Rougeot, 1978
- Ludia pupillata Strand, 1911
- Ludia styx Darge, 1996
- Ludia syngena Jordan, 1922
- Ludia tessmanni Strand, 1911
