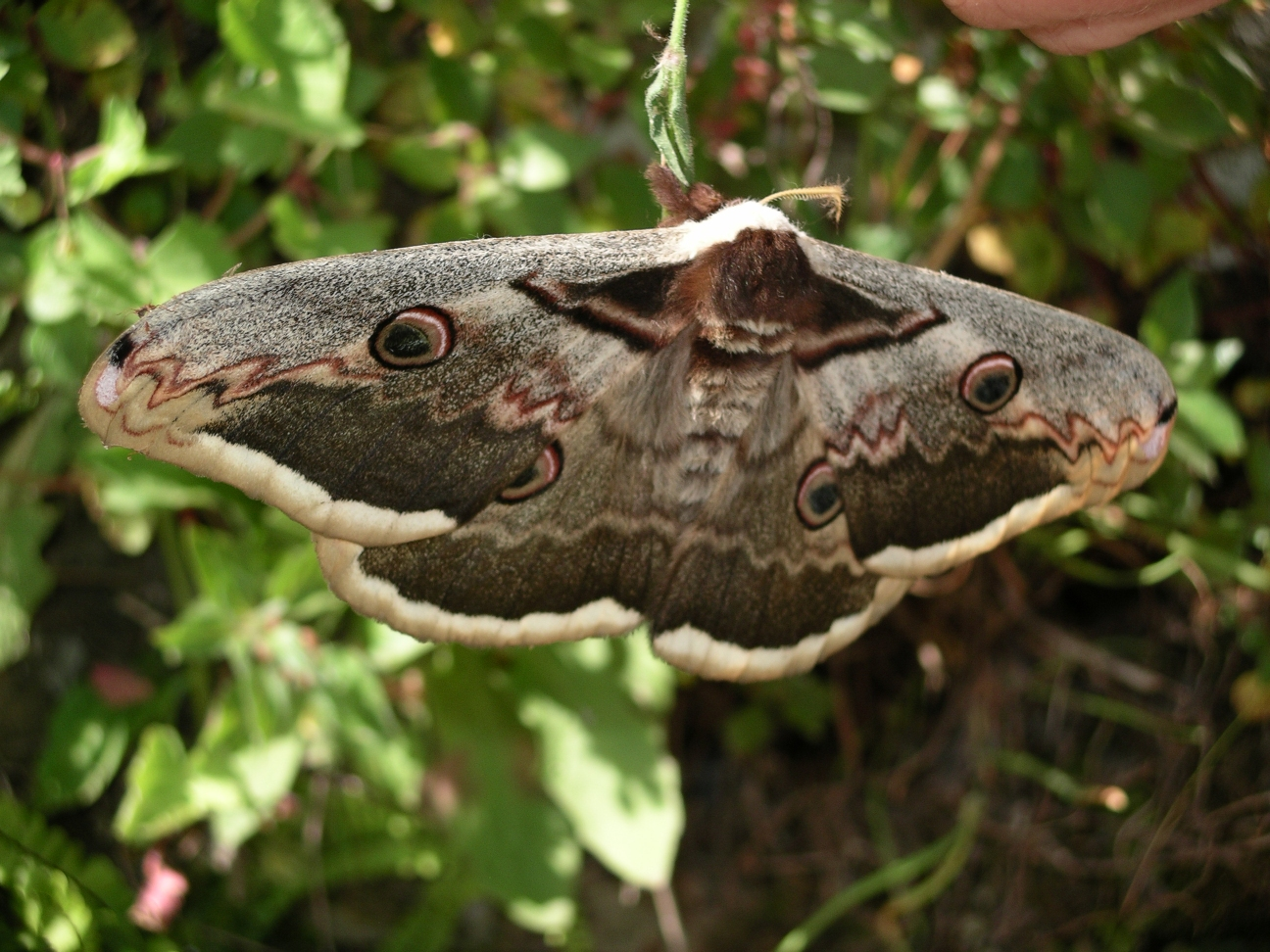
- Giant emperor moth (Saturnia pyri)

Scientific classification
- Kingdom: Animalia
- Phylum: Arthropoda
- Class: Insecta
- Order: Lepidoptera
- Family: Saturniidae
- Tribe: Saturniini
- Genus: Saturnia; Schrank, 1802

Synonyms
- Eudia Jordan in Seitz, 1911; Heraea Hübner, 1822; Pavonia Hübner [1819] (non Lamarck, 1816: preoccupied)

= Saturnia (moth) =

Genus of moths

Saturnia is a genus of large silkmoths in the family Saturniidae, which the German biologist Franz von Paula Schrank first described in 1802. Its members are commonly named emperor moths, though this is also used for various close relatives in subfamily Saturniinae. The known species are found across the Palearctic. However, three allied species, commonly called "saturnia moths" inhabit the chaparral of California. These have been included as species of the genus Saturnia in some schemes, but recently are treated as a separate genus Calosaturnia, only in the United States.

== Species ==
The known species of Saturnia are:

- Saturnia atlantica Lucas, 1848
- Saturnia bieti Oberthür, 1886
- Saturnia cameronensis Lemaire, 1979
- Saturnia centralis Naumann & Loeffler, 2005
- Saturnia cephalariae (Romanoff, 1885) (sometimes in Eudia)
- Saturnia cidosa Moore, 1865
- Saturnia cognata Jordan in Seitz, 1911
- Saturnia koreanis Brechlin, 2009
- Saturnia luctifera Jordan in Seitz, 1911
- Saturnia pavonia (Linnaeus, 1758) – small emperor moth (sometimes in Eudia)
- Saturnia pavoniella (Scopoli, 1763) (sometimes in Eudia)
- Saturnia pinratanai Lampe, 1989
- Saturnia pyri (Denis & Schiffermüller, 1775) – giant emperor moth, Viennese emperor moth
- Saturnia spini (Denis & Schiffermuller, 1775) – sloe emperor moth (sometimes in Eudia)
- Saturnia taibaishanis Brechlin, 2009
- Saturnia zuleika Hope, 1843

The following American species have been previously included in Saturnia in some schemes, but more recently as Calosaturnia

- Saturnia albofasciata (Johnson, 1938) – white-streaked saturnia
- Saturnia mendocino Behrens, 1876 – Mendocino saturnia
- Saturnia walterorum Hogue & Johnson, 1958 – Walter's saturnia

Else, the Brazilian Arsenura pandora has been previously placed in the genus Saturnia. Whether the autumn emperor moth (Perisomena caecigena), should be included in Saturnia needs to be determined; the same goes for the genus Neoris.
