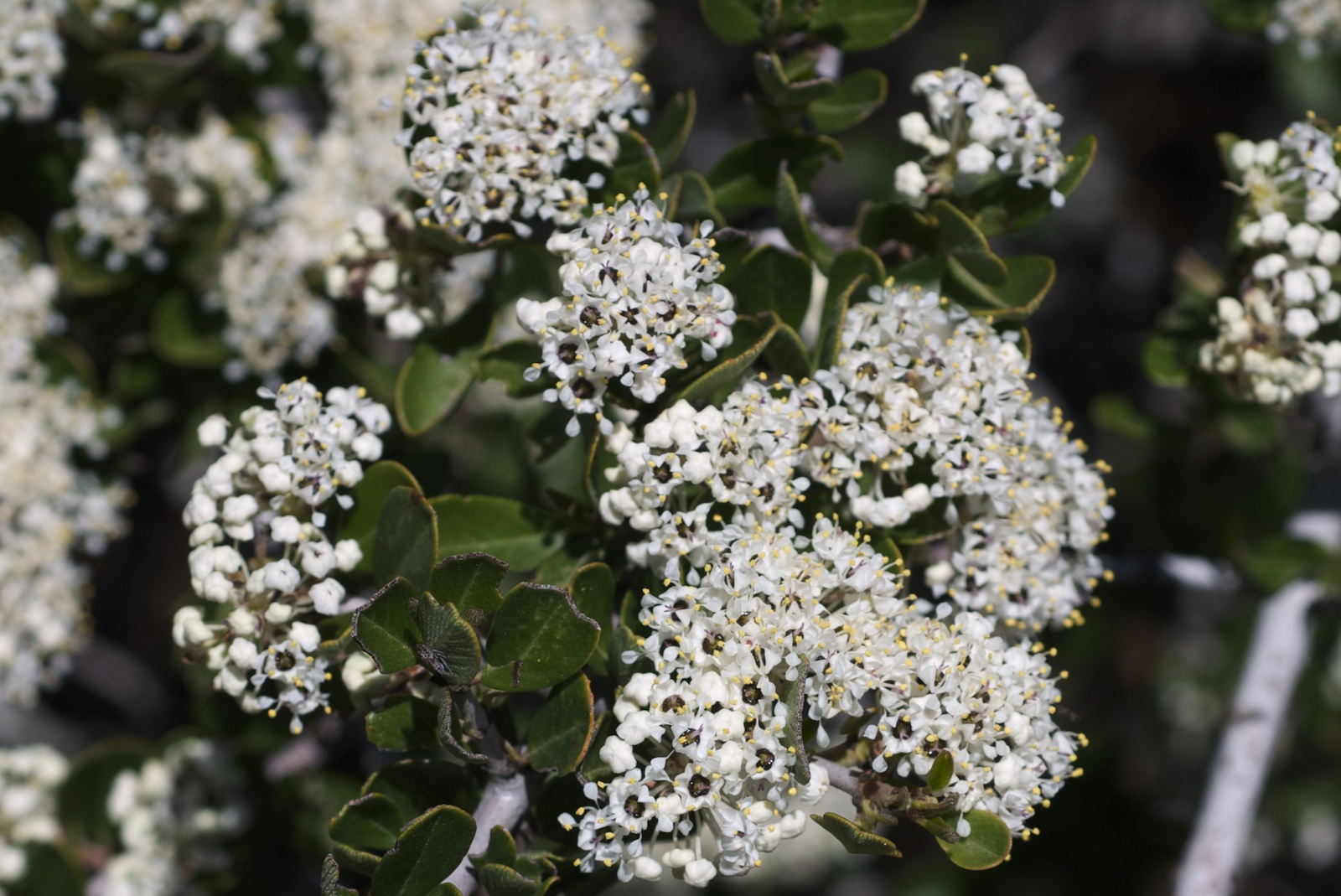

Scientific classification
- Kingdom: Plantae
- Clade: Embryophytes
- Clade: Tracheophytes
- Clade: Spermatophytes
- Clade: Angiosperms
- Clade: Eudicots
- Clade: Rosids
- Order: Rosales
- Family: Rhamnaceae
- Genus: Ceanothus
- Subgenus: C. subg. Cerastes
- Species: C. cuneatus

Binomial name
- Ceanothus cuneatus (Hook.) Nutt.

= Ceanothus cuneatus =

Species of flowering plant

Ceanothus cuneatus is a species of flowering shrub known by the common names buckbrush and wedgeleaf ceanothus.

== Distribution ==
This Ceanothus is native to Oregon, California, and northern Baja California, where it can be found in a number of habitats, especially chaparral.

== Description ==
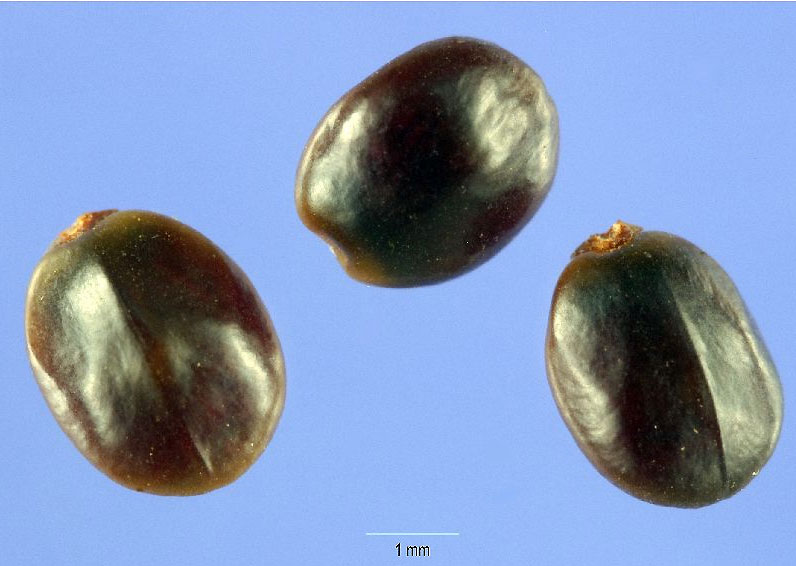
Buckbrush seeds

Ceanothus cuneatus is a spreading bush, rounded to sprawling, reaching up to 3 meters (9.8 ft) in height. The evergreen leaves are stiff and somewhat tough and may be slightly toothed along the edges. The bush flowers abundantly in short, thick-stalked racemes bearing rounded bunches of tiny flowers, each about half a centimeter wide.

The fragrant flowers are white, sometimes tinted strongly with blue or lavender. The fruit is a round capsule with horns. It is about half a centimeter wide and contains three shiny dark seeds which are dispersed when the capsule explodes and propels them some distance. Harvester ants have been known to cache the seeds, which can lie dormant for a long time since fire is required for germination. This plant may be variable in appearance because it hybridizes easily with similar species.

While this shrub has a wide distribution in its range, certain varieties of the species are limited to small areas. The Monterey ceanothus (var. rigida), for example, is found only between the southern edge of the San Francisco Bay Area and San Luis Obispo County.

== Ecology ==
It is a larval host to the California hairstreak, California tortoiseshell, ceanothus silkmoth, echo blue, hedgerow hairstreak, Pacuvius duskywing, western green hairstreak, and white-streaked saturnia moth.
