= Calosaturnia =

Scientific classification
- Kingdom: Animalia
- Phylum: Arthropoda
- Class: Insecta
- Order: Lepidoptera
- Family: Saturniidae
- Tribe: Saturniini
- Genus: Calosaturnia; Smith, 1886

Genus of moths

Calosaturnia is a genus of moths in the family Saturniidae first described by John Bernhard Smith in 1886. The genus is sometimes included in Saturnia (at times as a subgenus).

== Species ==
- Calosaturnia albofasciata Johnson, 1938 – white-streaked saturnia
- Calosaturnia mendocino (Behrens, 1876) – Mendocino saturnia
- Calosaturnia walterorum Hogue & Johnson, 1958 – Walter's saturnia
