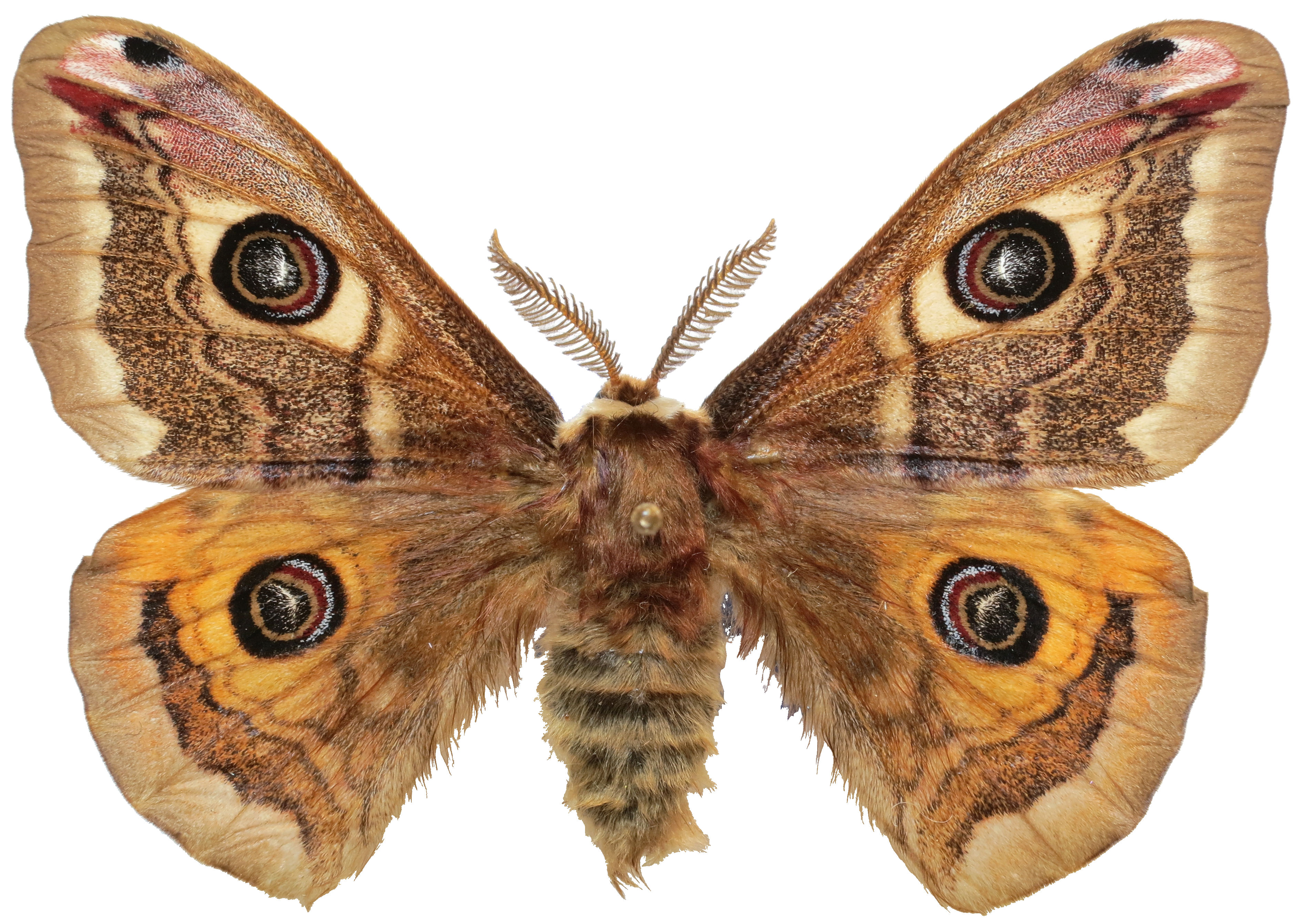
- Male from Friuli-Venezia Giulia, Italy

Scientific classification
- Domain: Eukaryota
- Kingdom: Animalia
- Phylum: Arthropoda
- Class: Insecta
- Order: Lepidoptera
- Family: Saturniidae
- Genus: Saturnia
- Species: S. pavoniella

Binomial name
- Saturnia pavoniella (Scopoli, 1763)

Synonyms
- Phalaena pavoniella Scopoli, 1763; Saturnia carpini var. ligurica Weismann, 1876; Saturnia pavonia var. meridionalis Calberla, 1887; Saturnia ligurica ssp. donauensis Seyer, 1991.; Saturnia ligurica ssp. melichi Seyer, 1991

= Saturnia pavoniella =

Species of moth

Saturnia pavoniella is a moth of the family Saturniidae. It is found in the alpine regions of Austria, Italy (including Sicily) and the Czech Republic across south-eastern Europe to northern Turkey and the Caucasus. It is possibly also present in south-eastern France.

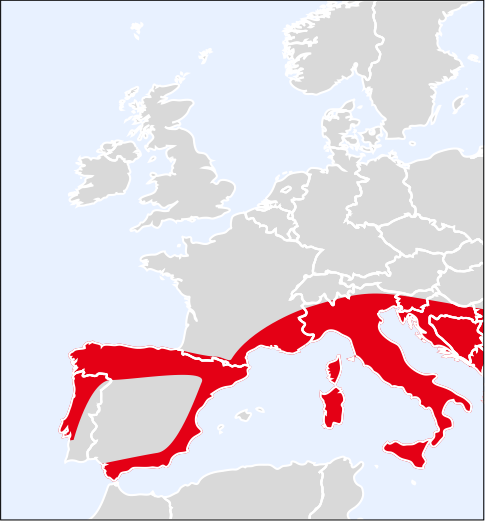
Range in Europe

The wingspan is 45–70 mm (1.8–2.8 in) for males and 50–95 mm (2.0–3.7 in) for females. Adults are on wing from February to June. In northern Greece they are mainly found in May.

The larvae feed on a wide variety of plants. Recorded foodplants include Betula, Calluna, Carpinus, Crataegus, Erica, Filipendula, Hippophae, Lythrum, Malus, Potentilla, Prunus spinosa, Pyrus, Quercus Rosa, Rubus, Salix, Spiraea and Vaccinium. In northern Greece the preferred hosts are Rubus ulmifolius and Pyrus amygdaliformis.

== Gallery ==
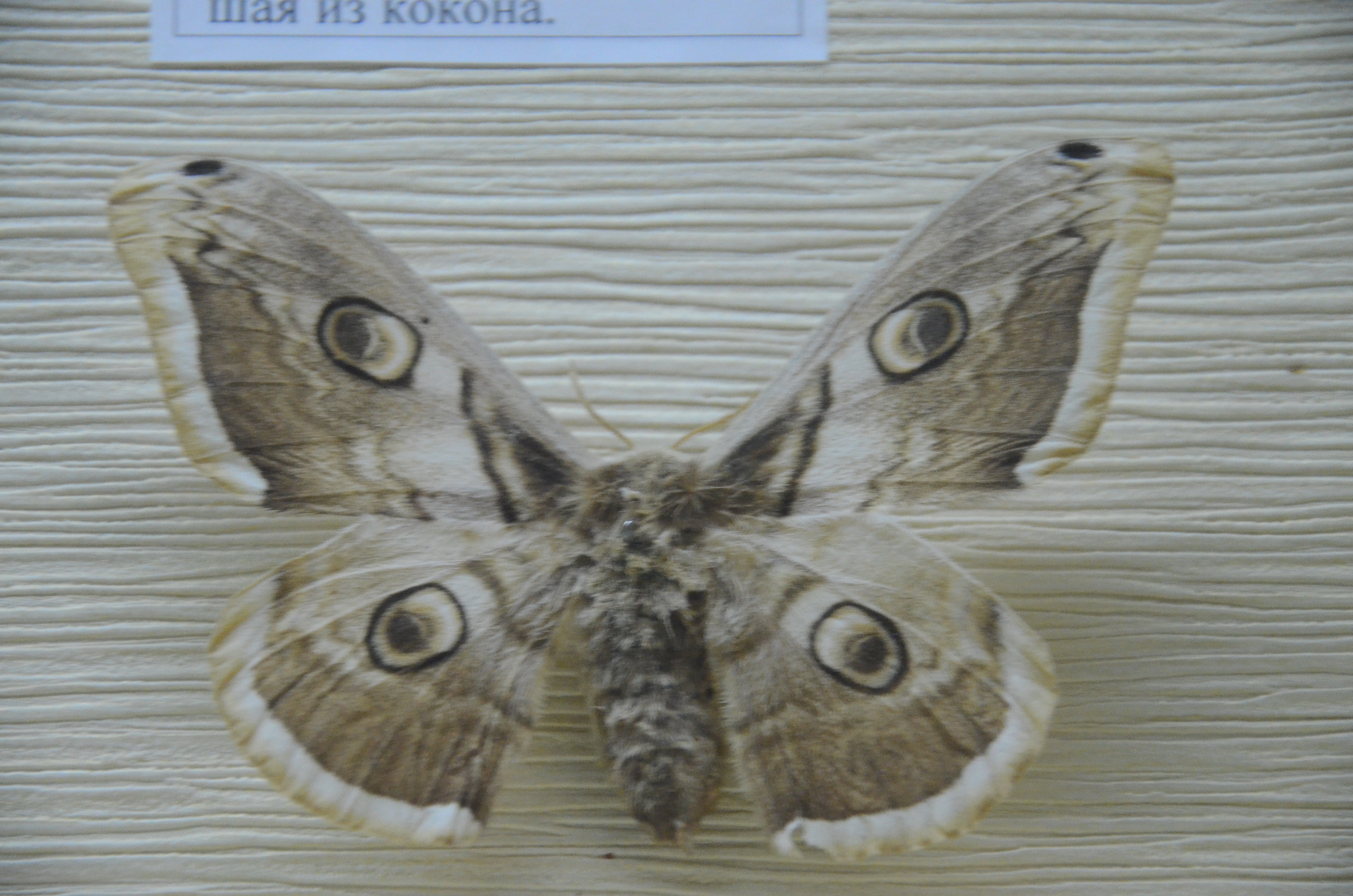

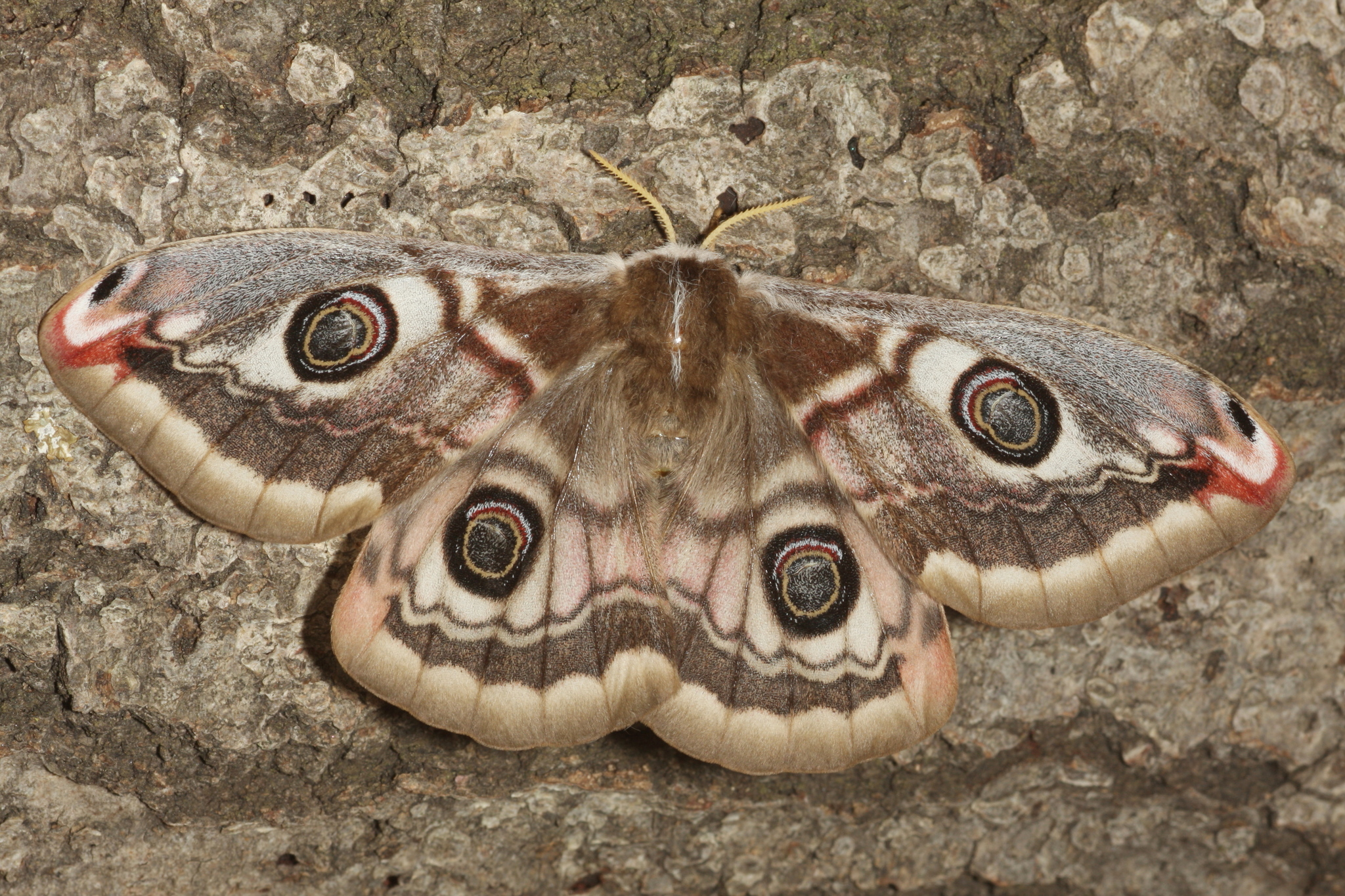

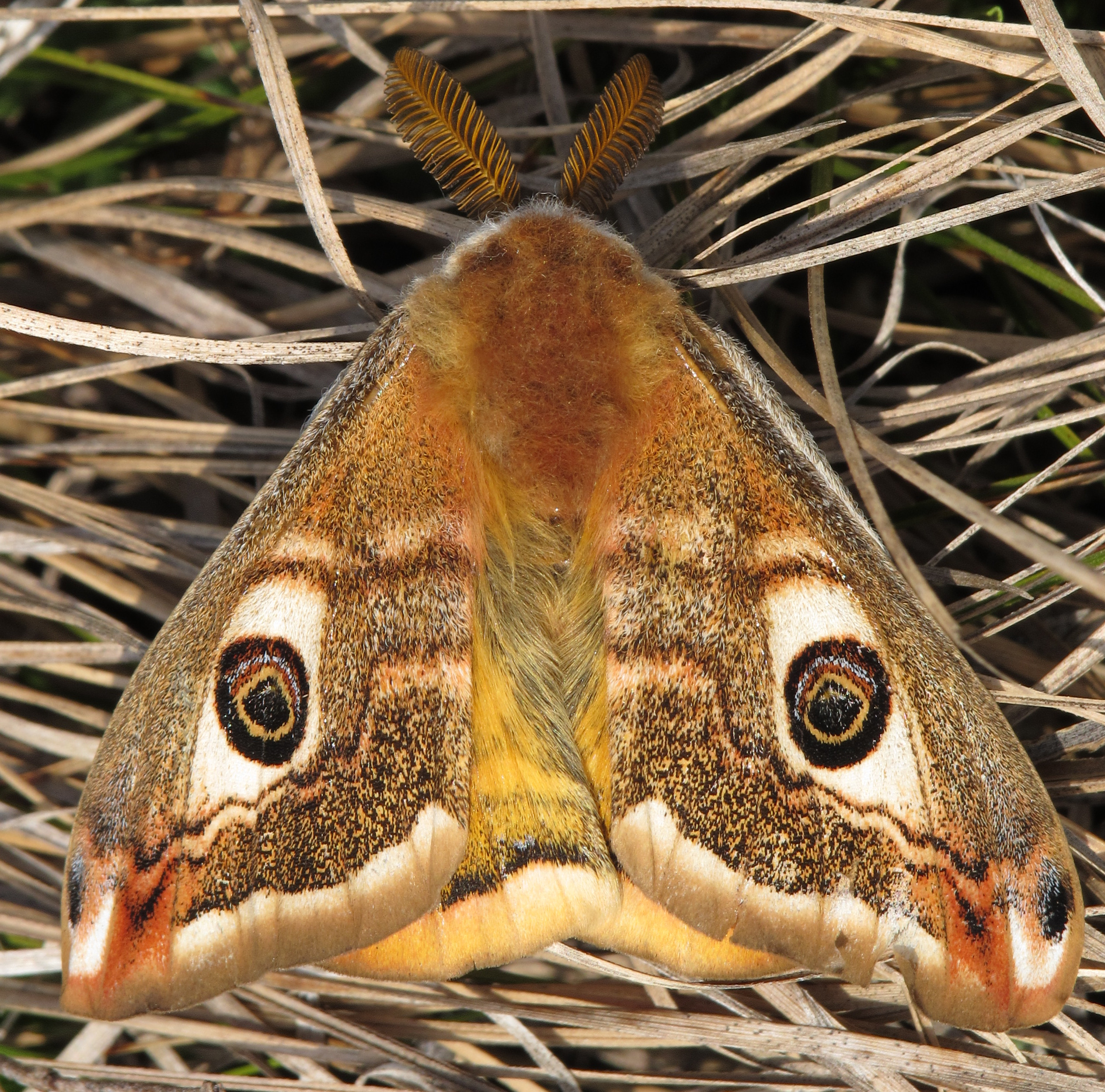

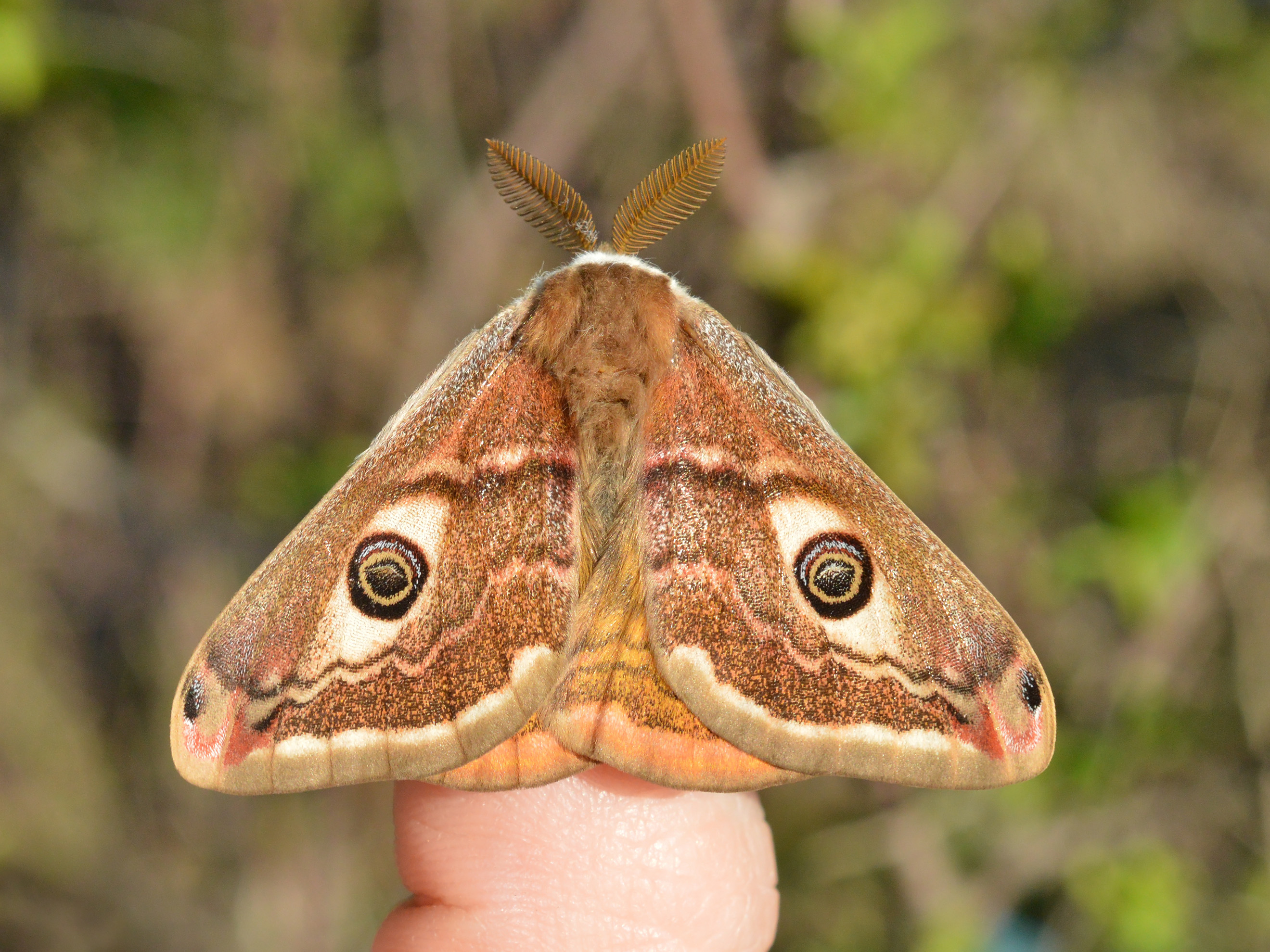

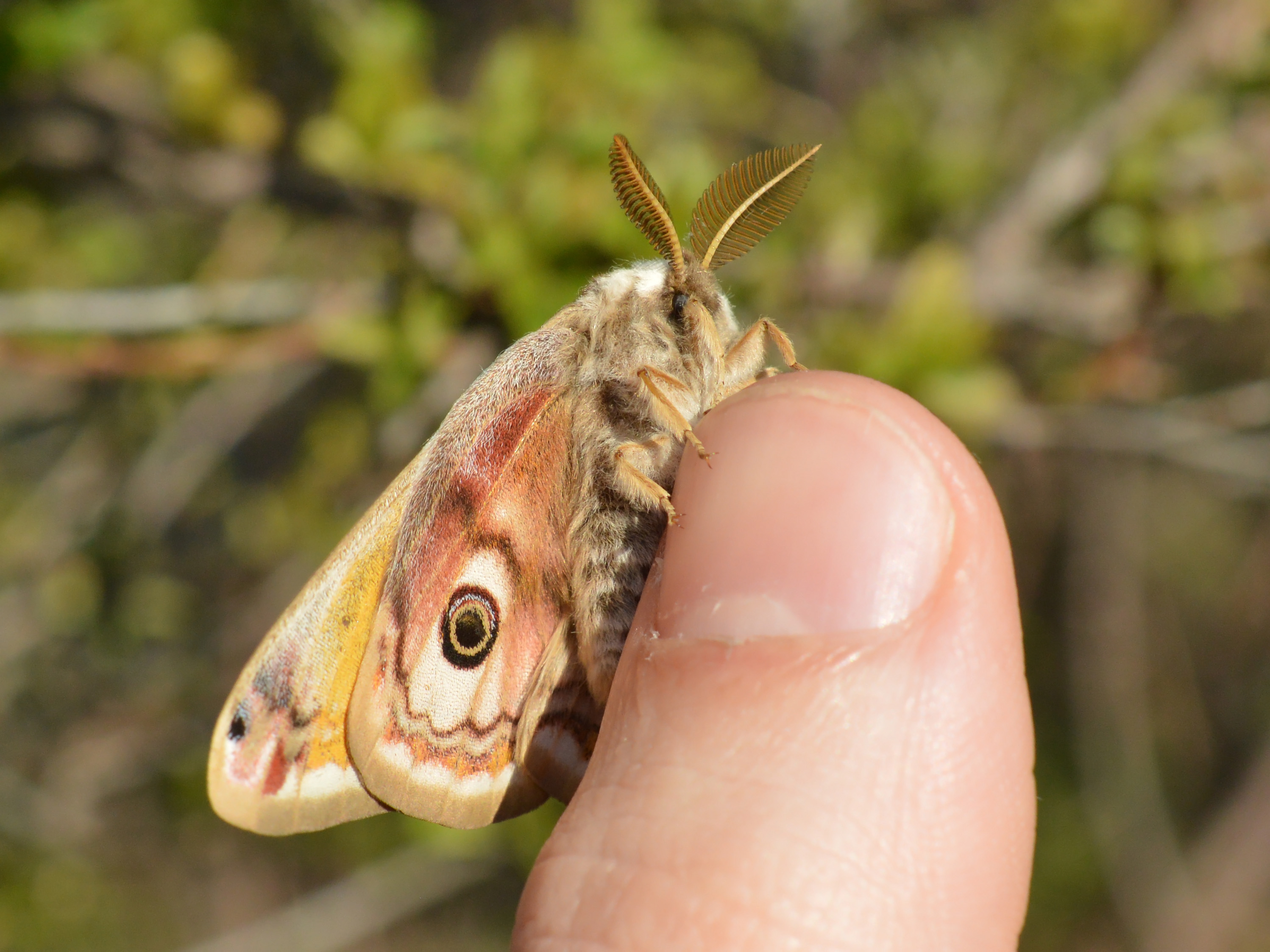

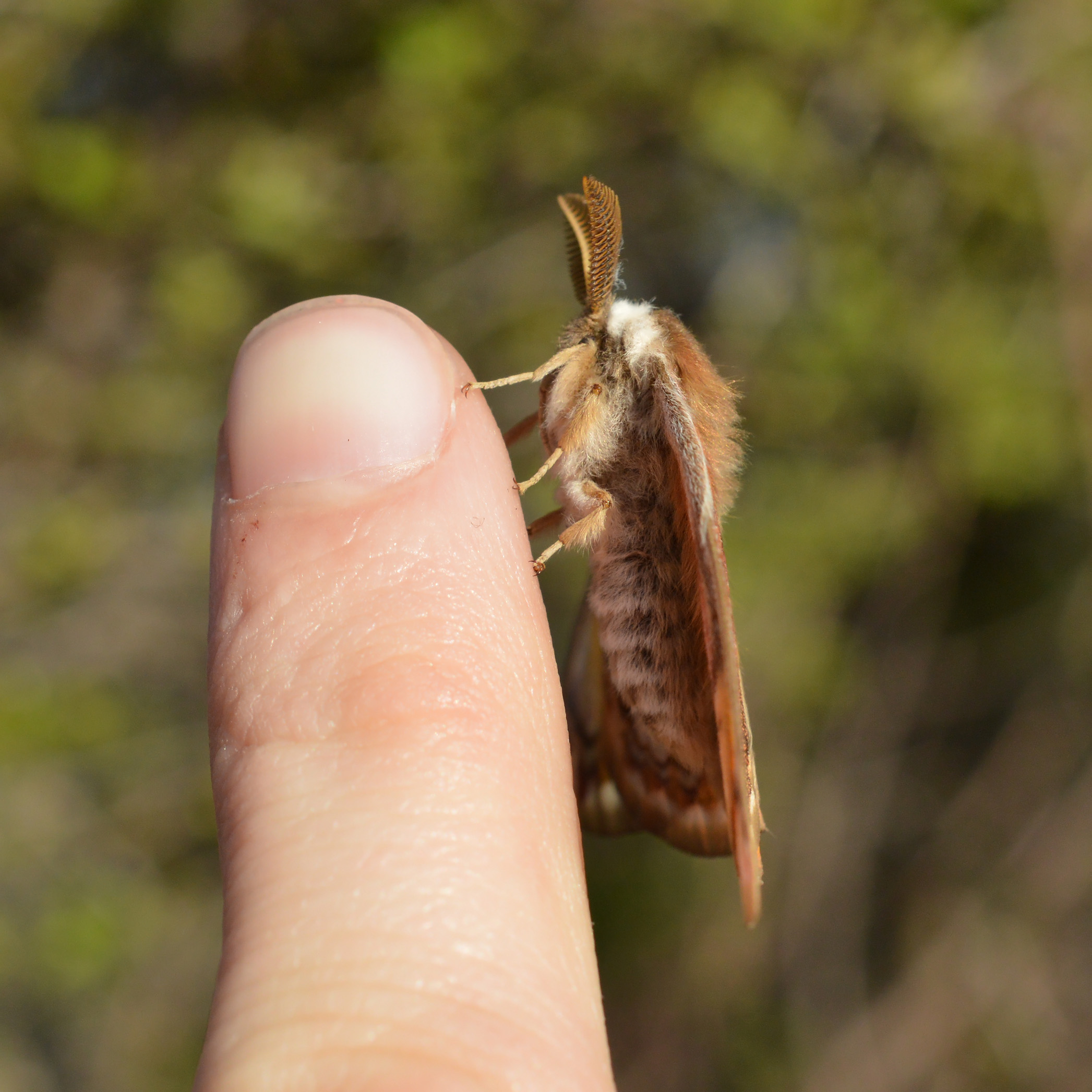

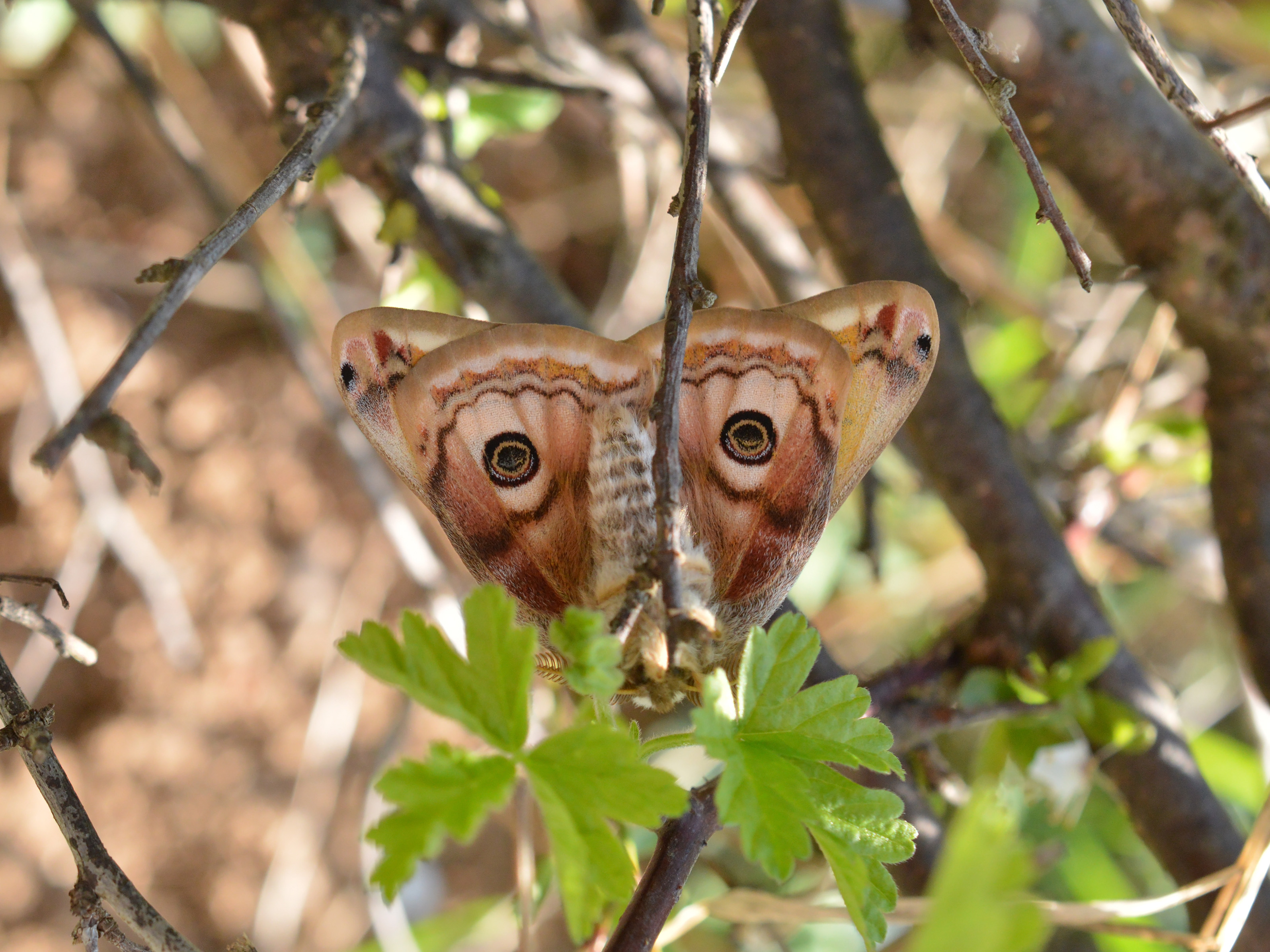

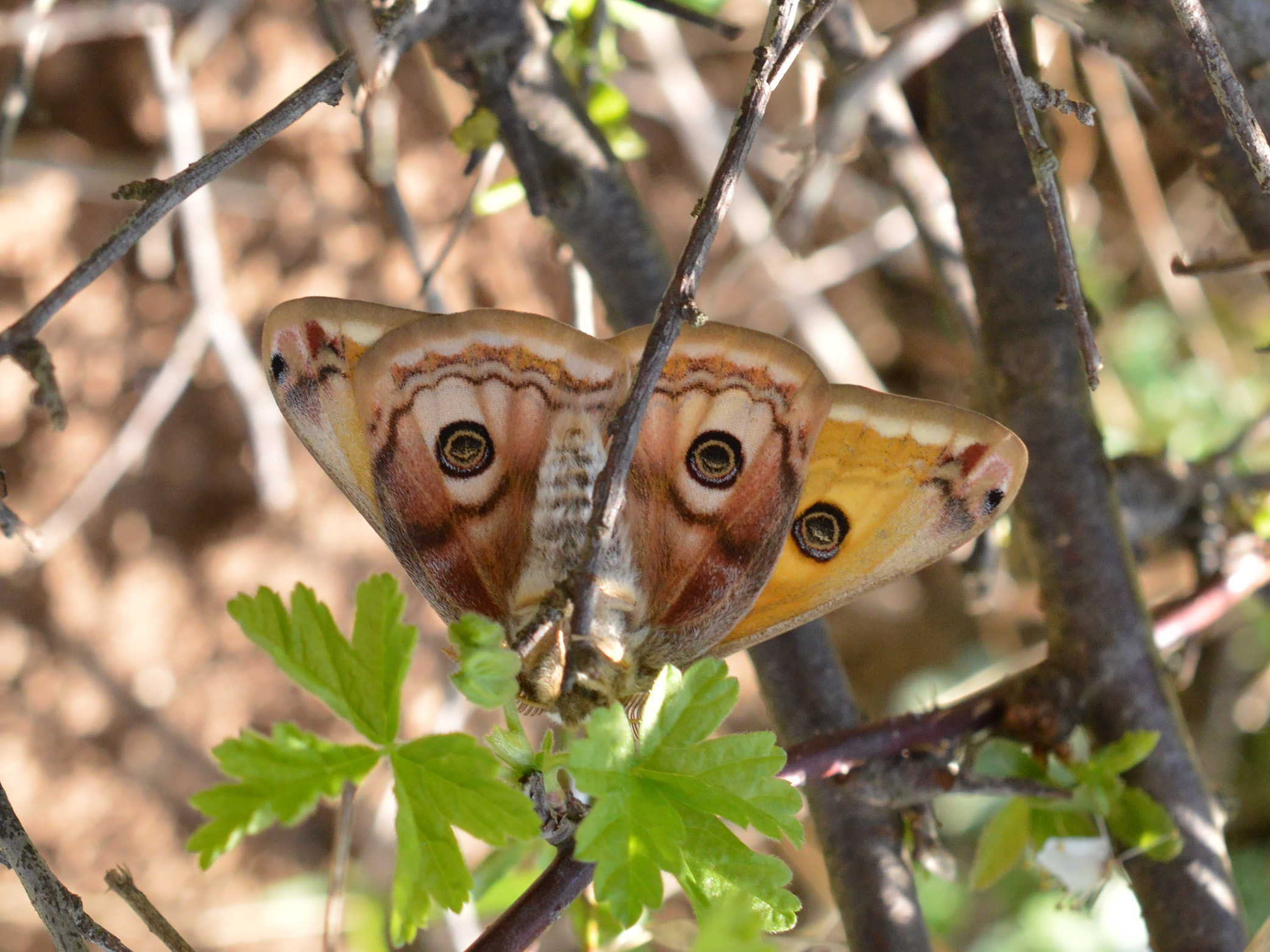

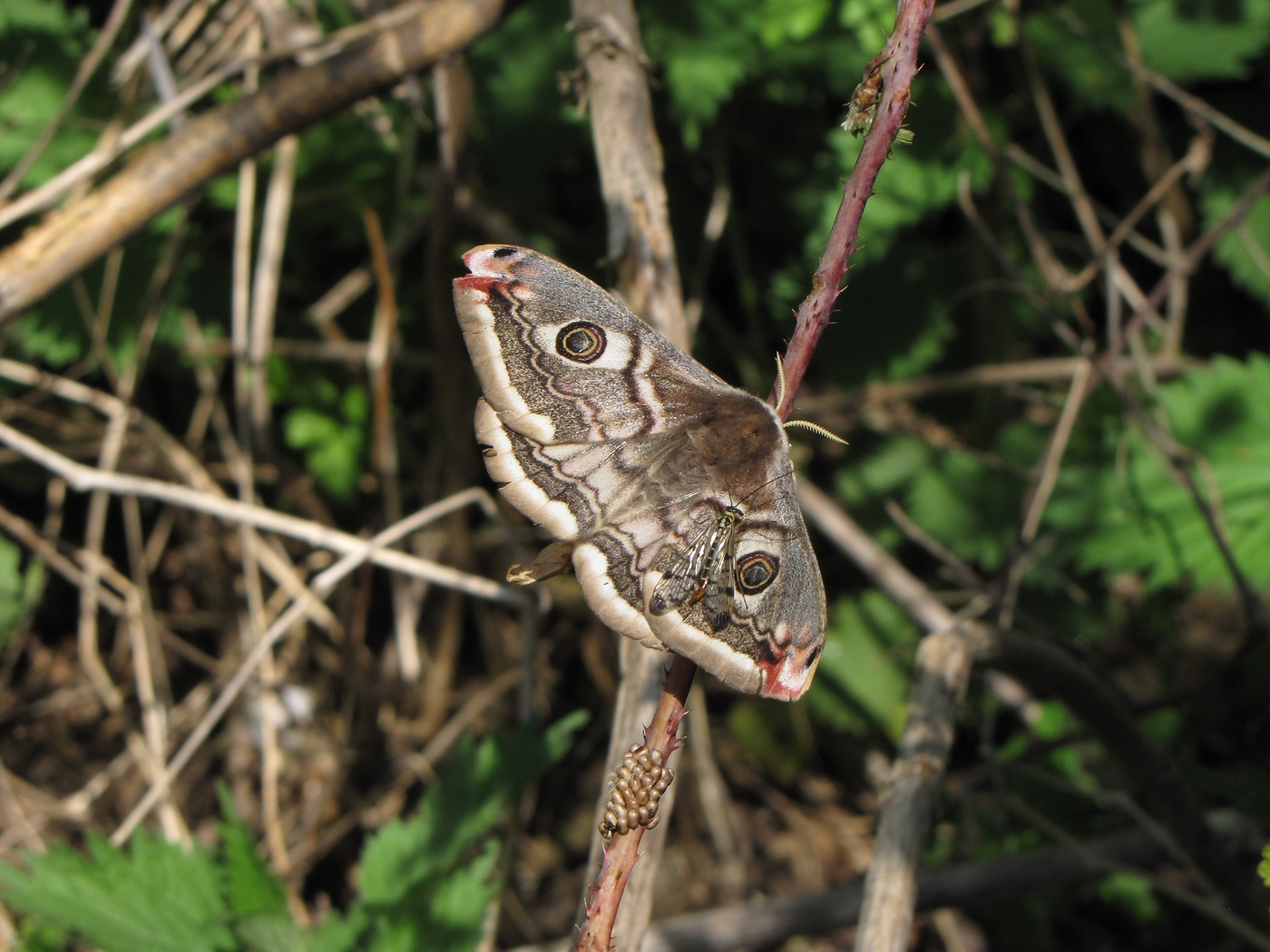
