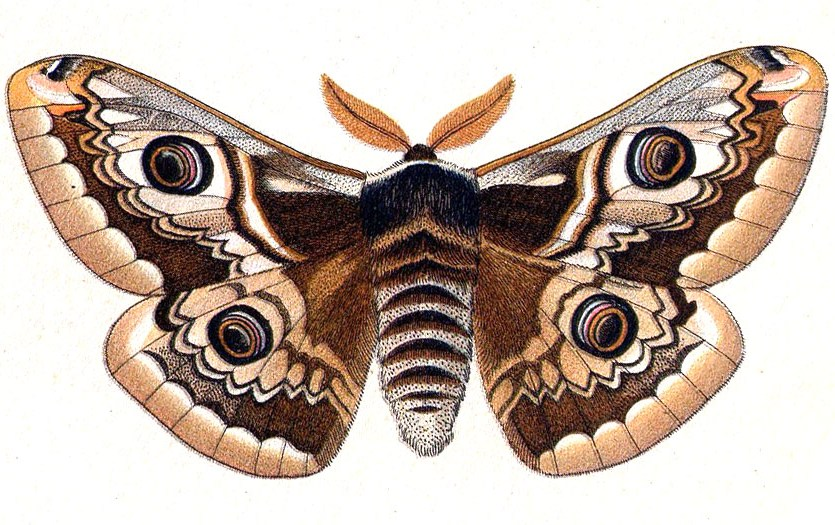

Scientific classification
- Domain: Eukaryota
- Kingdom: Animalia
- Phylum: Arthropoda
- Class: Insecta
- Order: Lepidoptera
- Family: Saturniidae
- Genus: Saturnia
- Species: S. spini

Binomial name
- Saturnia spini (Denis & Schiffermuller, 1775)

Synonyms
- Saturnia media Esper, 1782; Saturnia obsoleta Tutt, 1902; Saturnia fusca Schultz, 1909; Saturnia oblitescens Schultz, 1909; Saturnia microphthalmica Schultz, 1909; Saturnia subhyalina Schultz, 1909; Saturnia contigua Schultz, 1909; Saturnia continua Jordan, 1911; Saturnia infumata Gschwandner, 1919; Saturnia conjuncta Gschwandner, 1919; Saturnia dilutibasis Gschwandner, 1919; Saturnia albescens Gschwandner, 1919; Saturnia lurida Gschwandner, 1923

= Saturnia spini =

Species of moth

Saturnia spini, the sloe emperor moth, is a moth of the family Saturniidae. The species was first described by Michael Denis and Ignaz Schiffermüller in 1775. It is found from eastern Austria and Poland across eastern and south-eastern Europe to Greece, Turkey, Armenia, Ukraine (including Crimea), and Kazakhstan.

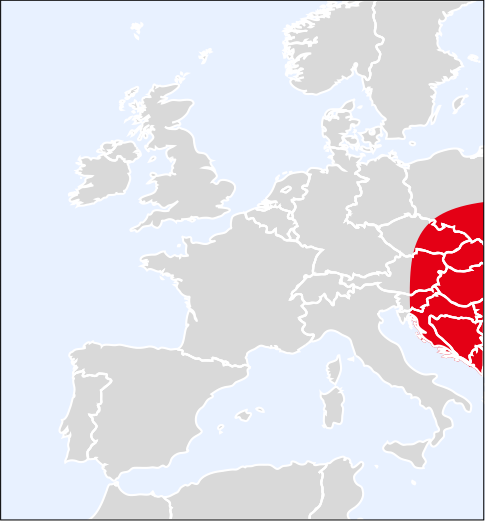
Range in Europe

It has a wingspan of 55–90 mm. Adults are on wing from April to June in one generation.

The larvae feed on Prunus spinosa, Rosa, Crataegus, Ulmus, Alnus, Salix, Populus and Malus in Europe. In Turkey and the Crimea it shows a preference for spiny members of the rose family.

There are no subspecies, although the population from Ukraine and southern Russia is sometimes treated as a subspecies, Saturnia spini haversoni Watson, 1911.
