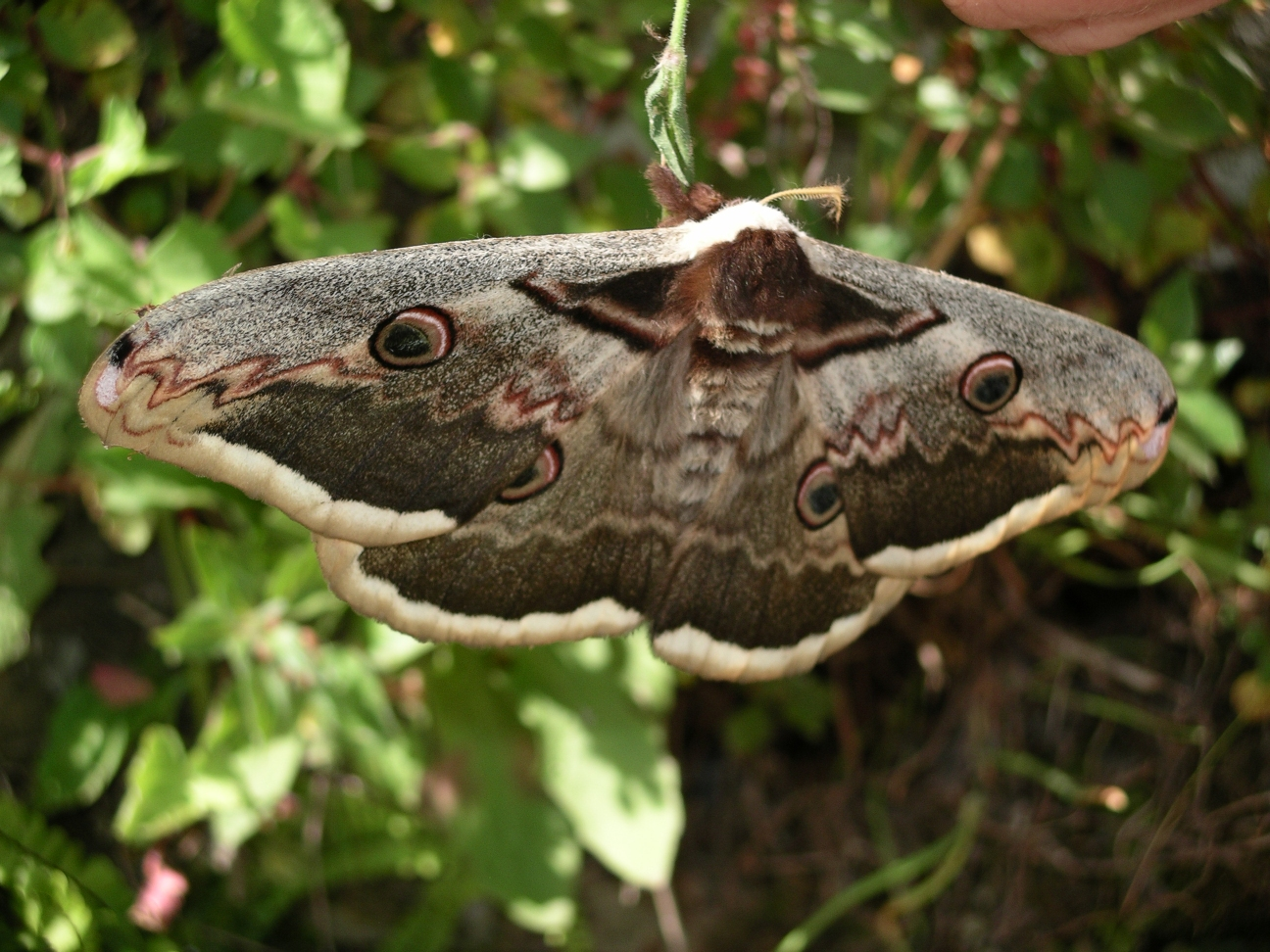

Scientific classification
- Kingdom: Animalia
- Phylum: Arthropoda
- Clade: Pancrustacea
- Class: Insecta
- Order: Lepidoptera
- Family: Saturniidae
- Genus: Saturnia
- Species: S. pyri

Binomial name
- Saturnia pyri (Denis & Schiffermüller, 1775)

Synonyms
- Bombyx pyri [Denis & Schiffermüller], 1775

= Saturnia pyri =

Giant peacock moth

Species of moth

Saturnia pyri, the giant peacock moth, great peacock moth, giant emperor moth or Viennese emperor, is a Saturniid moth which is native to Europe. The species was first described by Michael Denis and Ignaz Schiffermüller in 1775. It is the largest European moth, with a wingspan reaching 15–20 cm (6–8 in).

The giant peacock moth has a range that includes the Iberian Peninsula, southern France, northern Hungary, central and southern Serbia, Croatia, Montenegro, southern and eastern Bulgaria, southern Greece southern Turkey, south Kyrgyzstan, western Syria, Lebanon, Israel, southern Romania, Russia, Ukraine, Czech Republic, Slovak Republic, Slovenia, North Macedonia and Italy and extends into Siberia and North Africa. It is absent from the UK, though a small handful of individuals have been recorded, likely of captive origin.

== Additional images ==
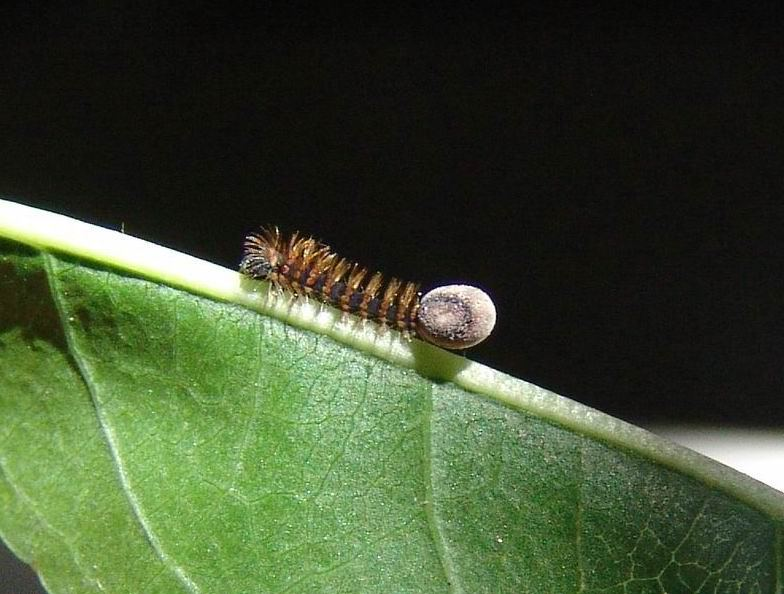
Hatching, with the egg still attached - on an almond leaf

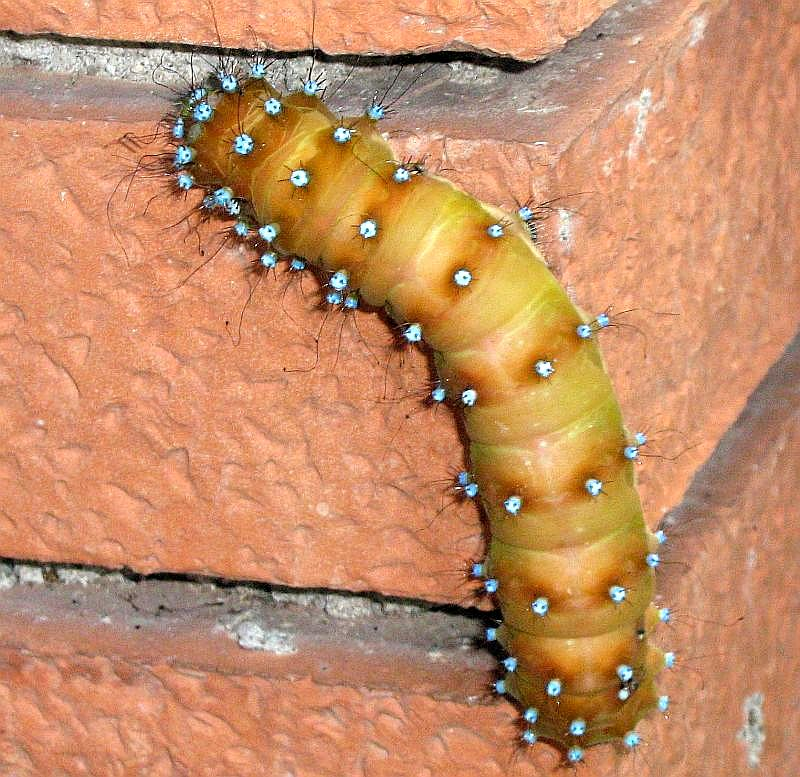
Caterpillar

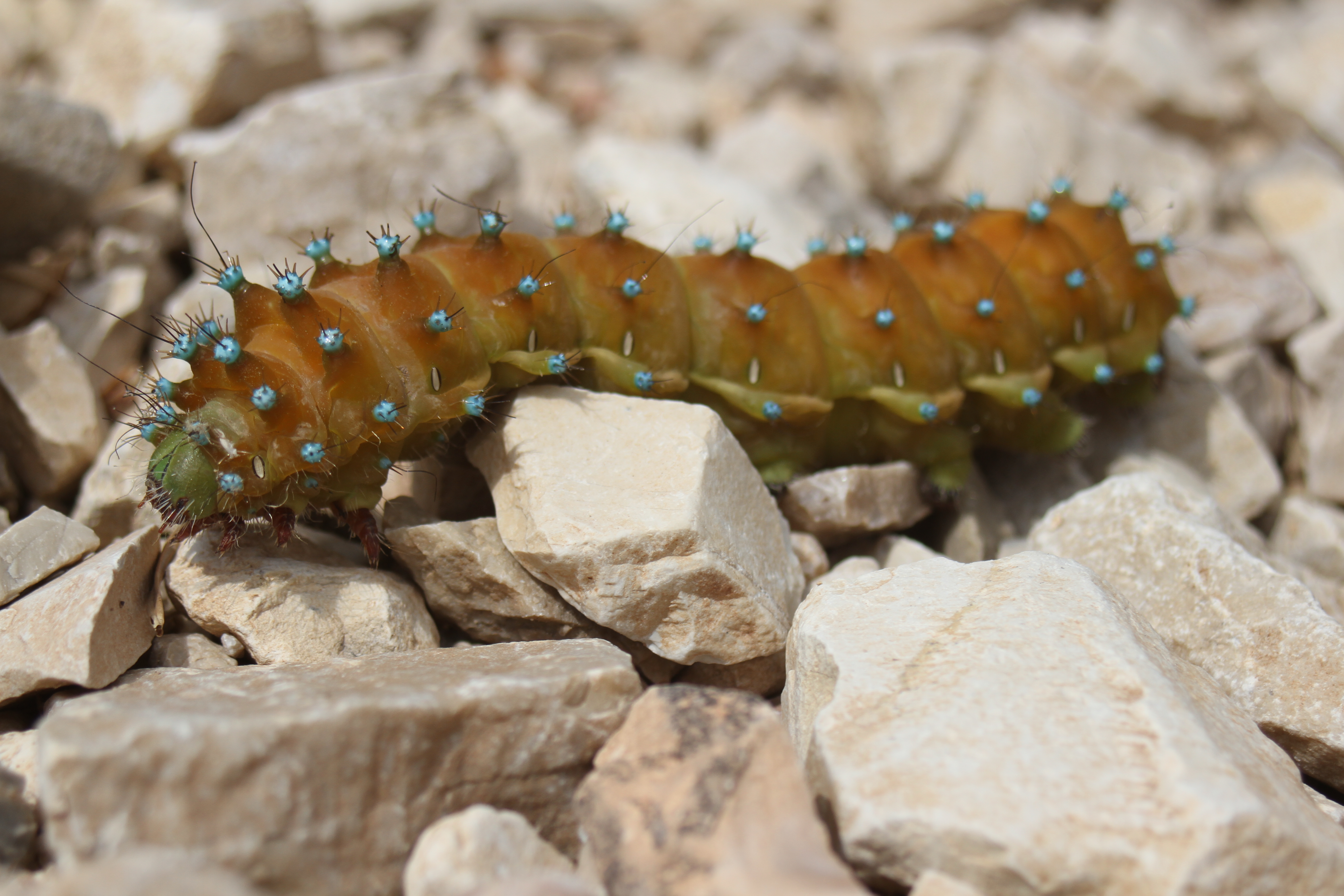
Caterpillar - high resolution

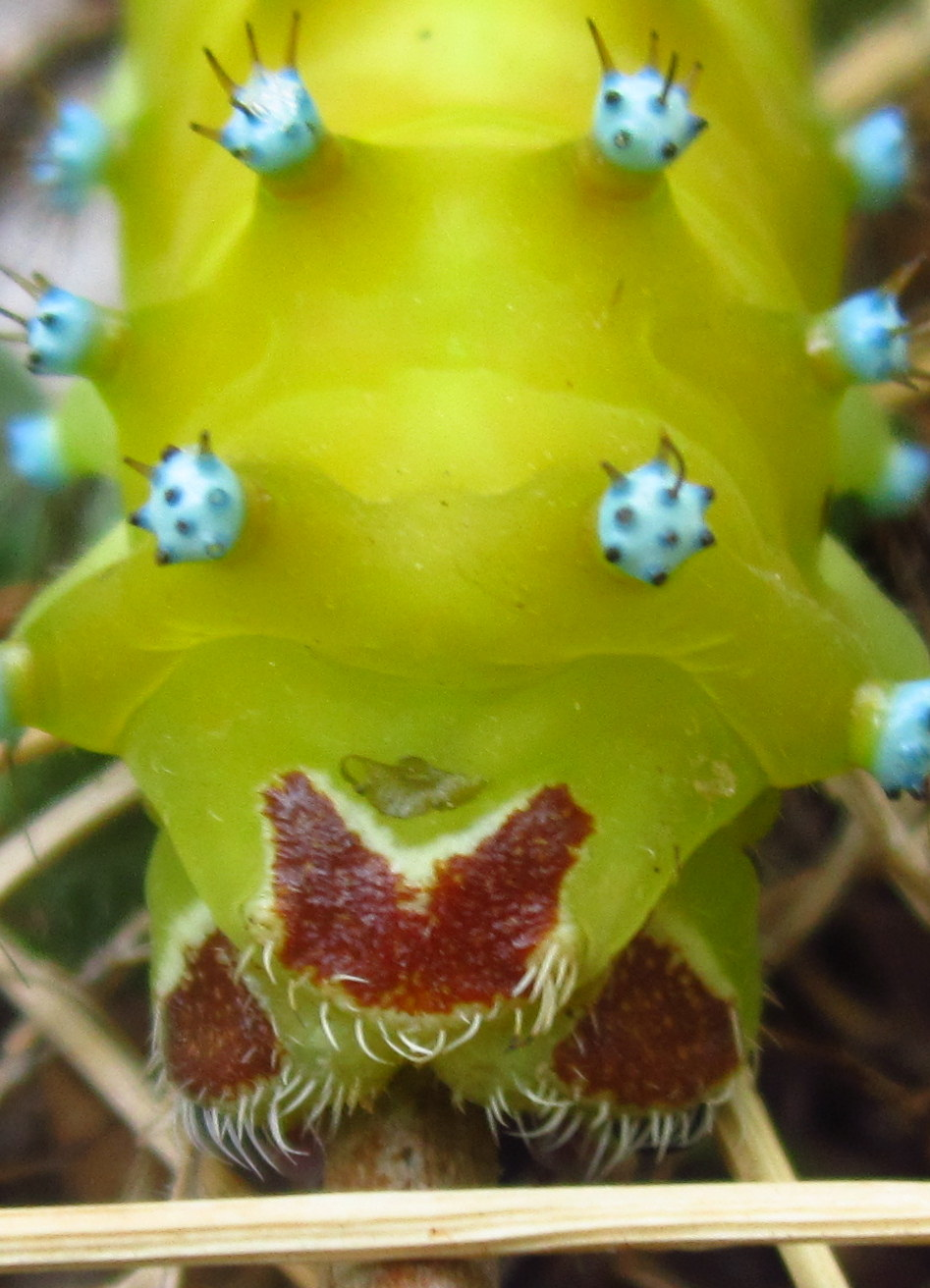
Caterpillar - detail

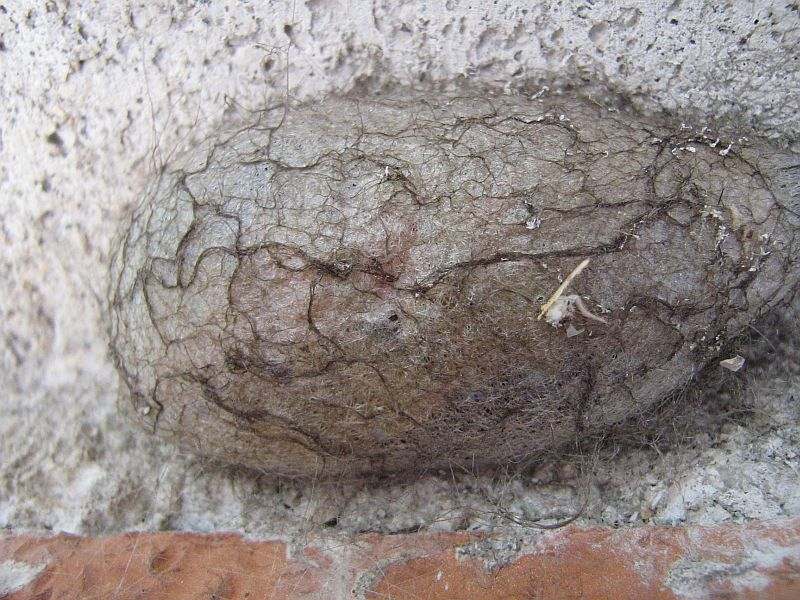
Cocoon

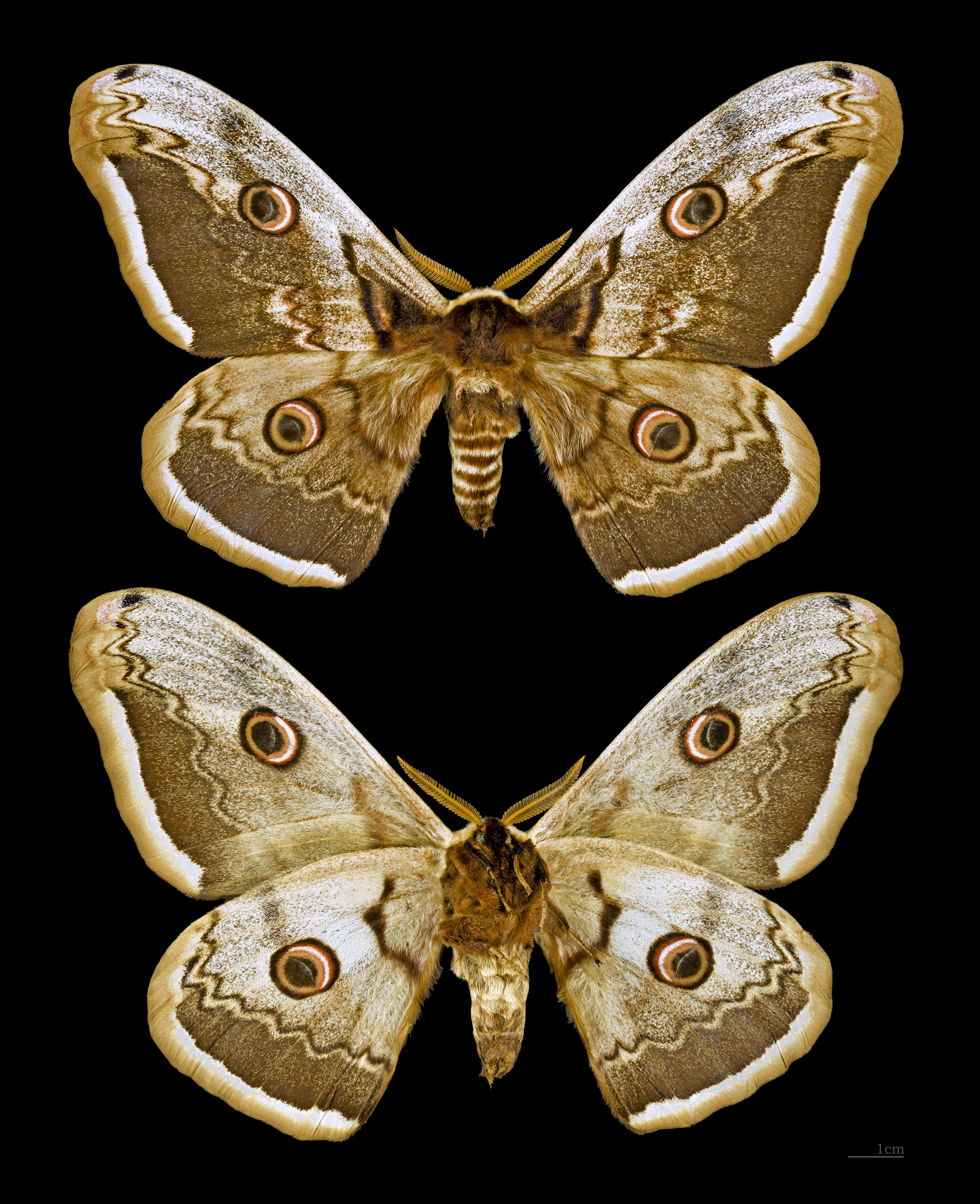
Male - MHNT

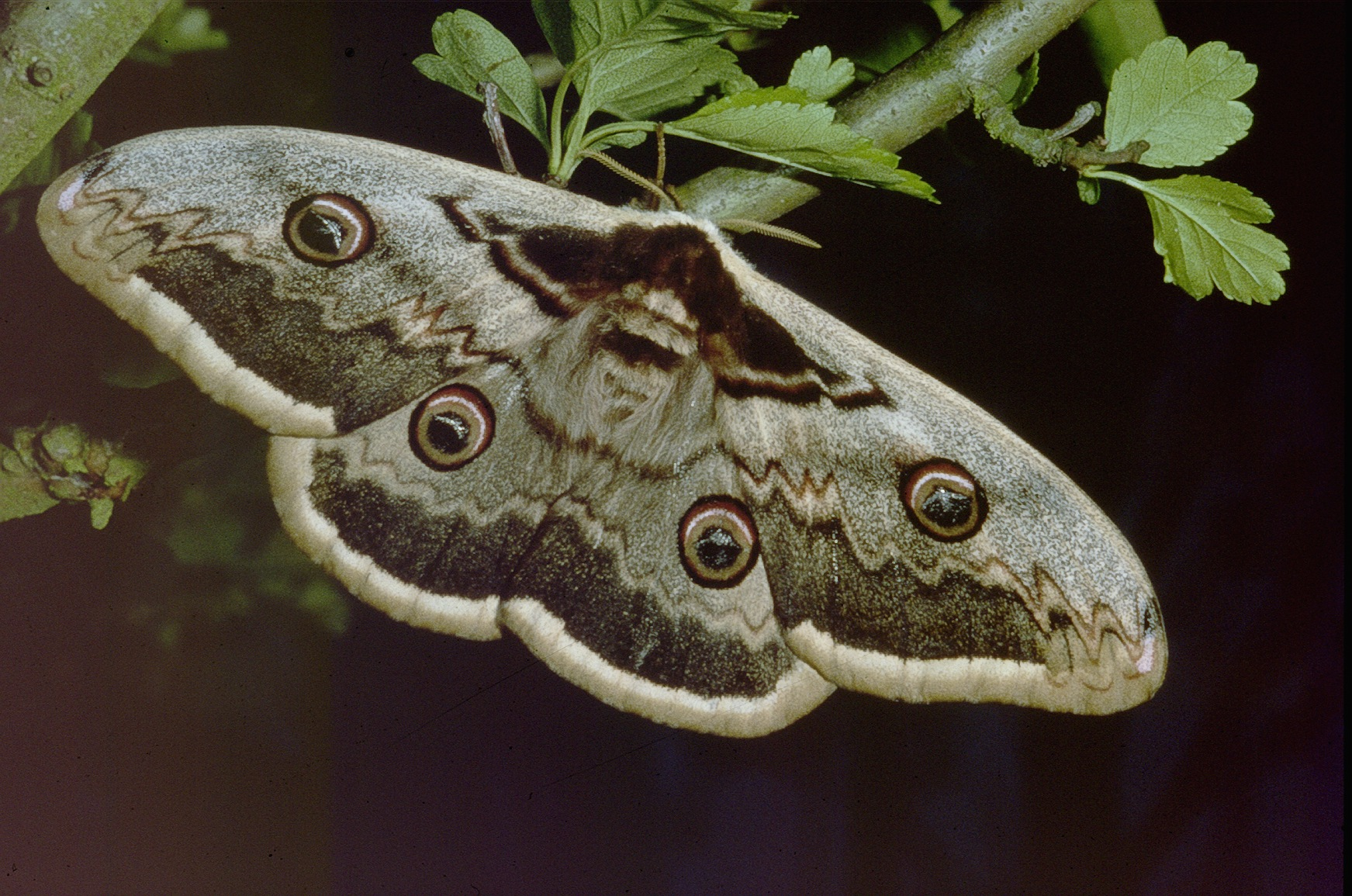
Female

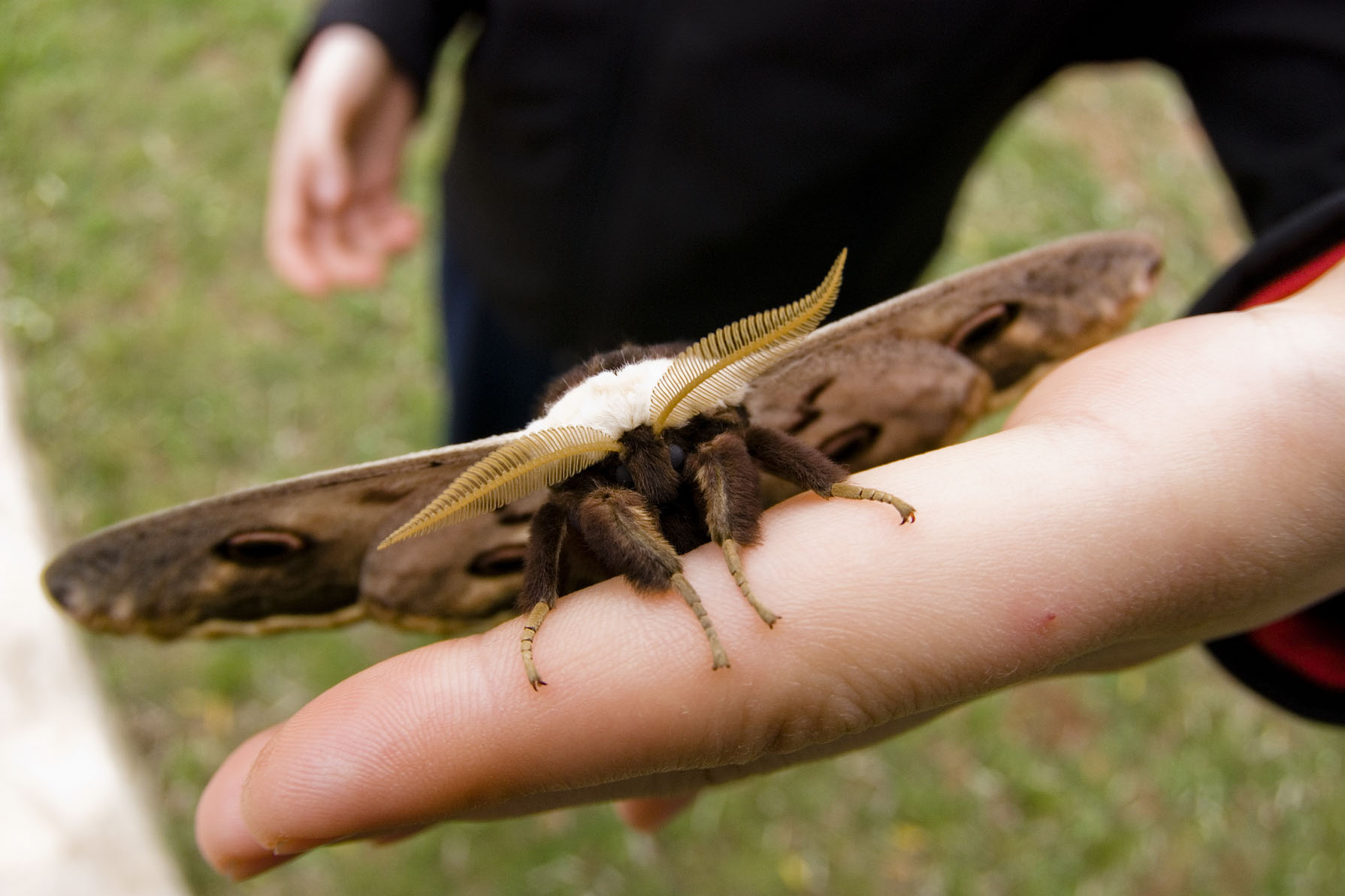
On a hand showing its large size

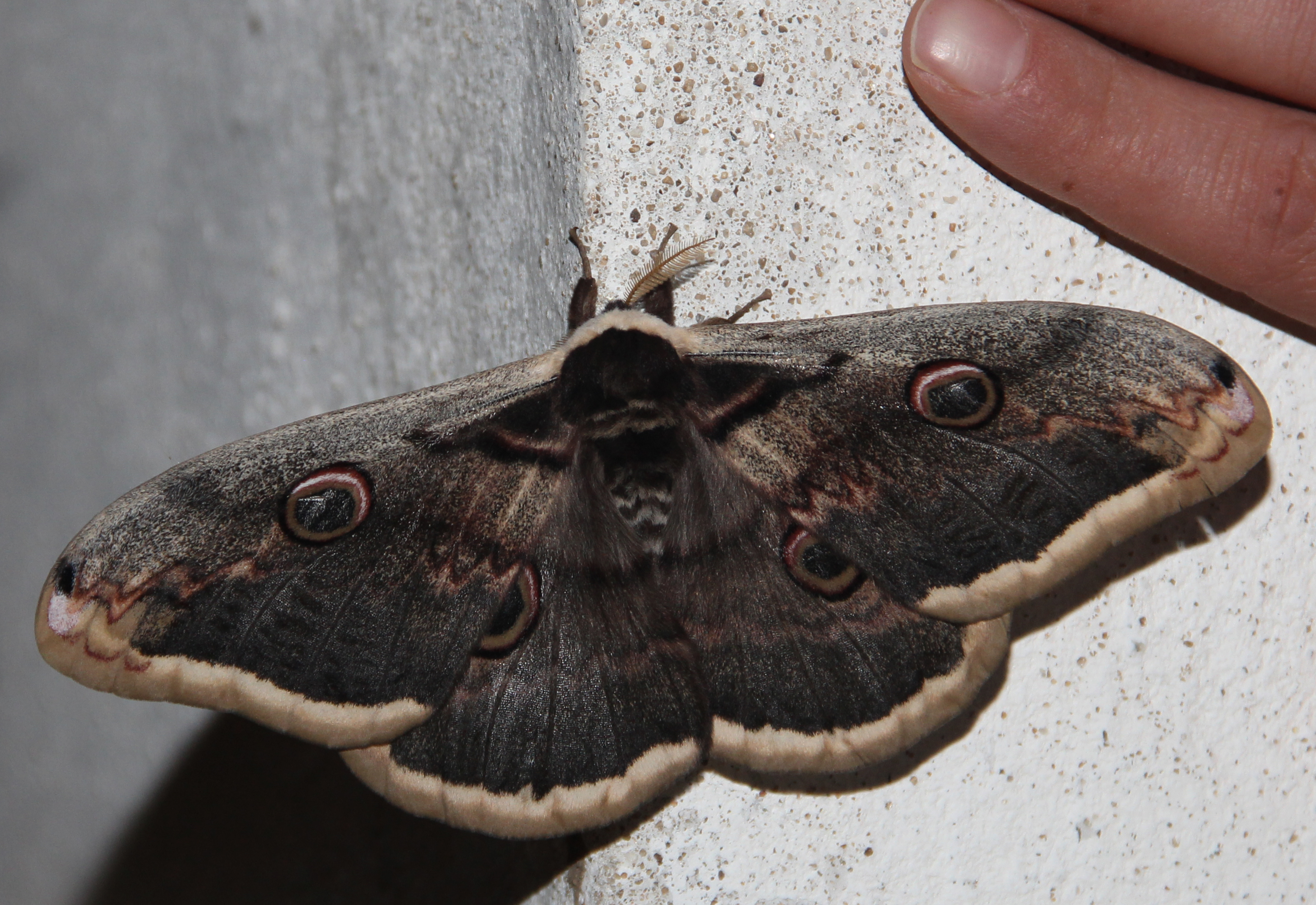
In the Czech Republic

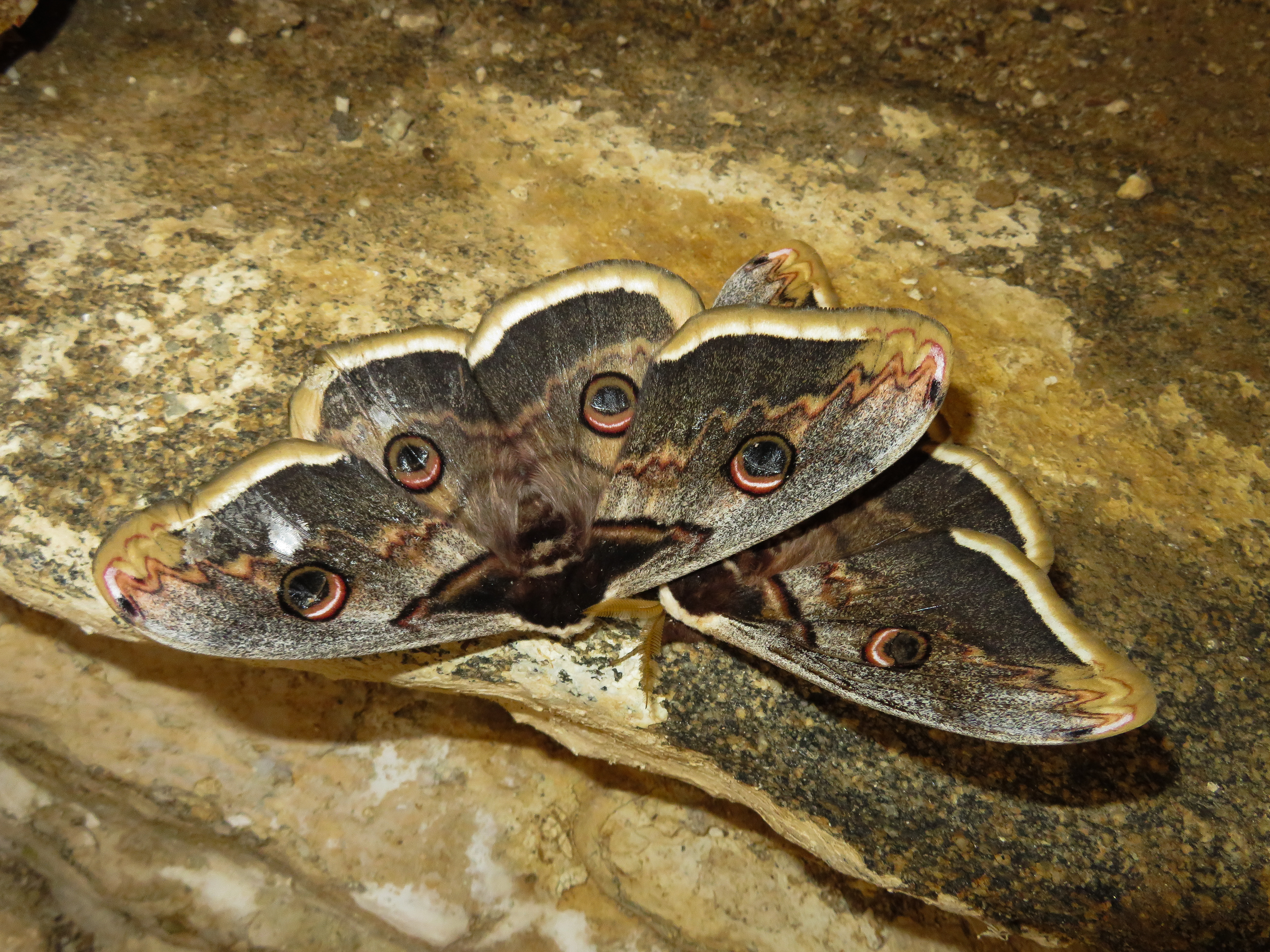
In Greece

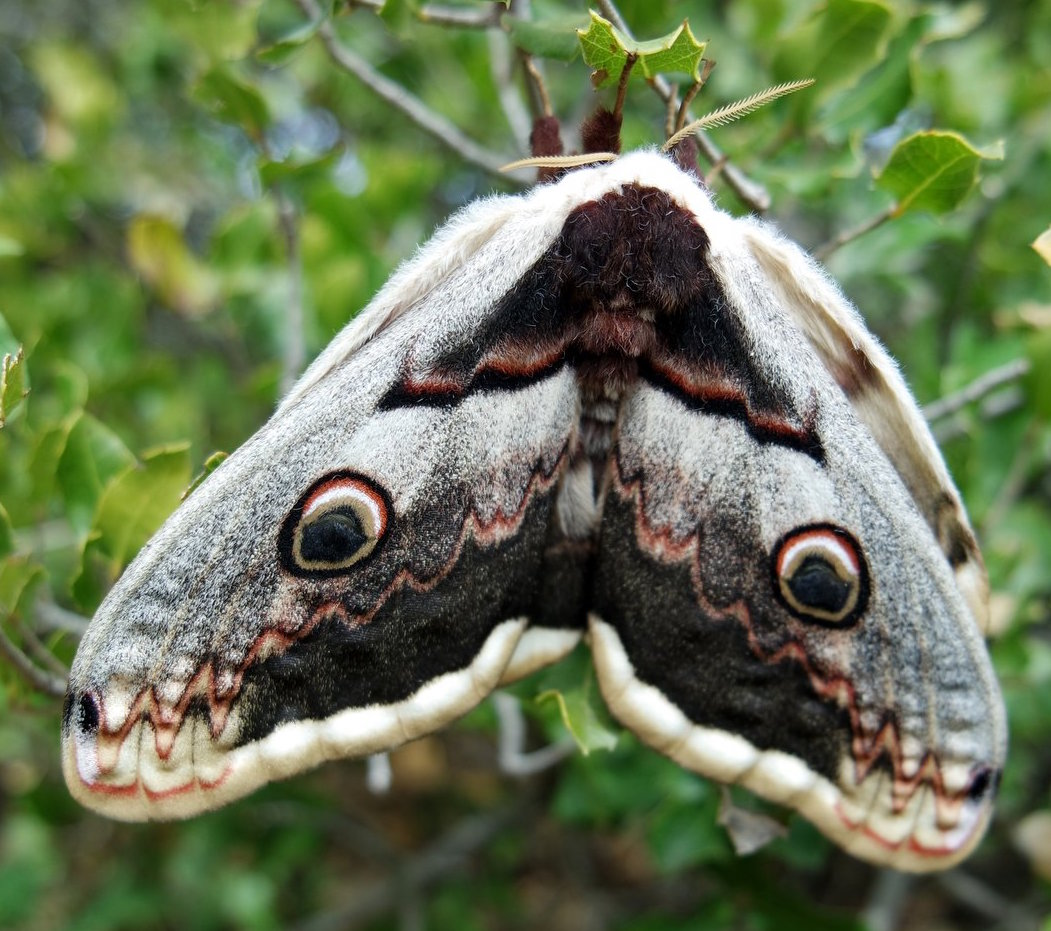
On Mount Meron in northern Israel

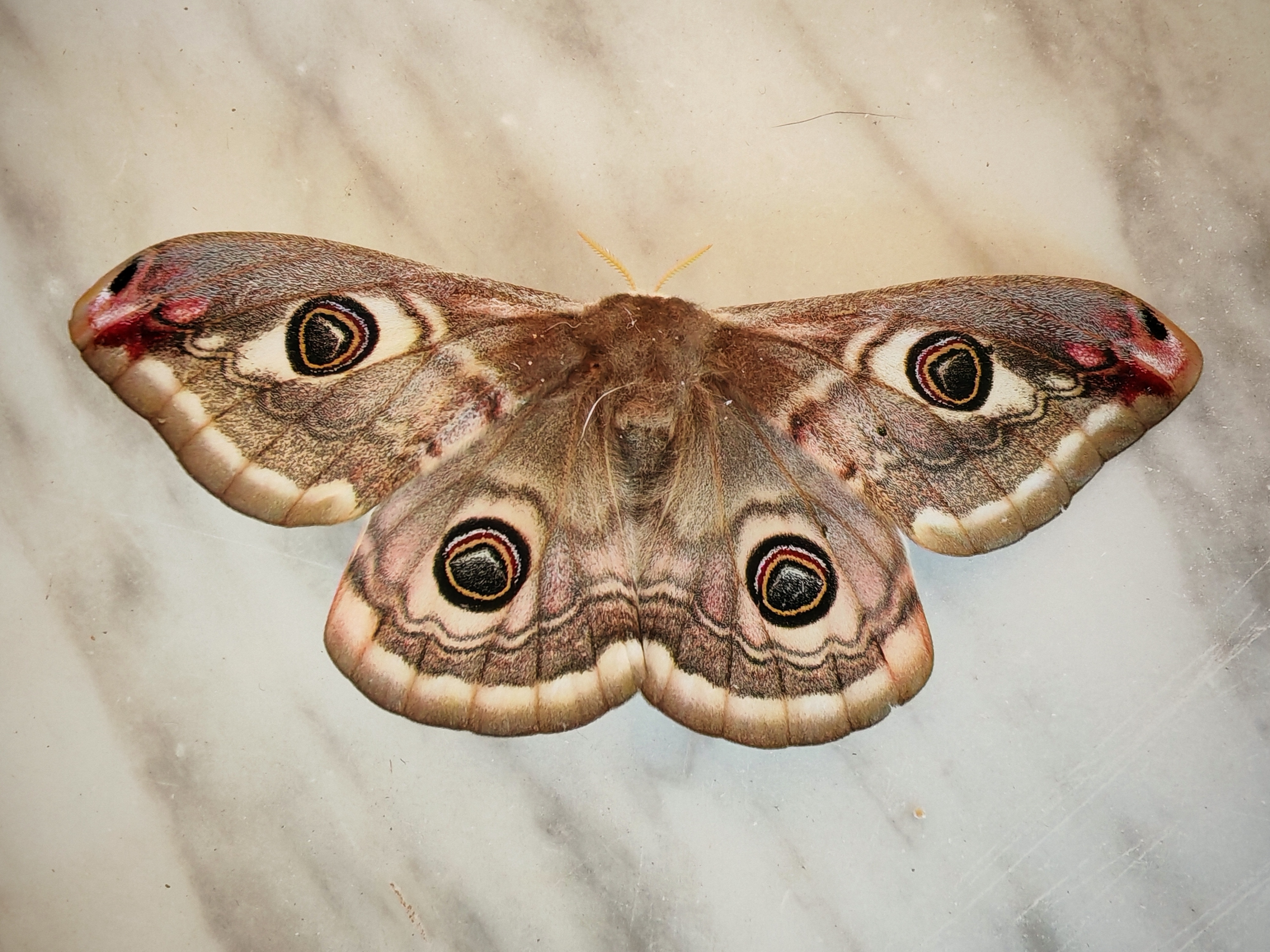
A female specimen on a marble slab - Northern Tuscany

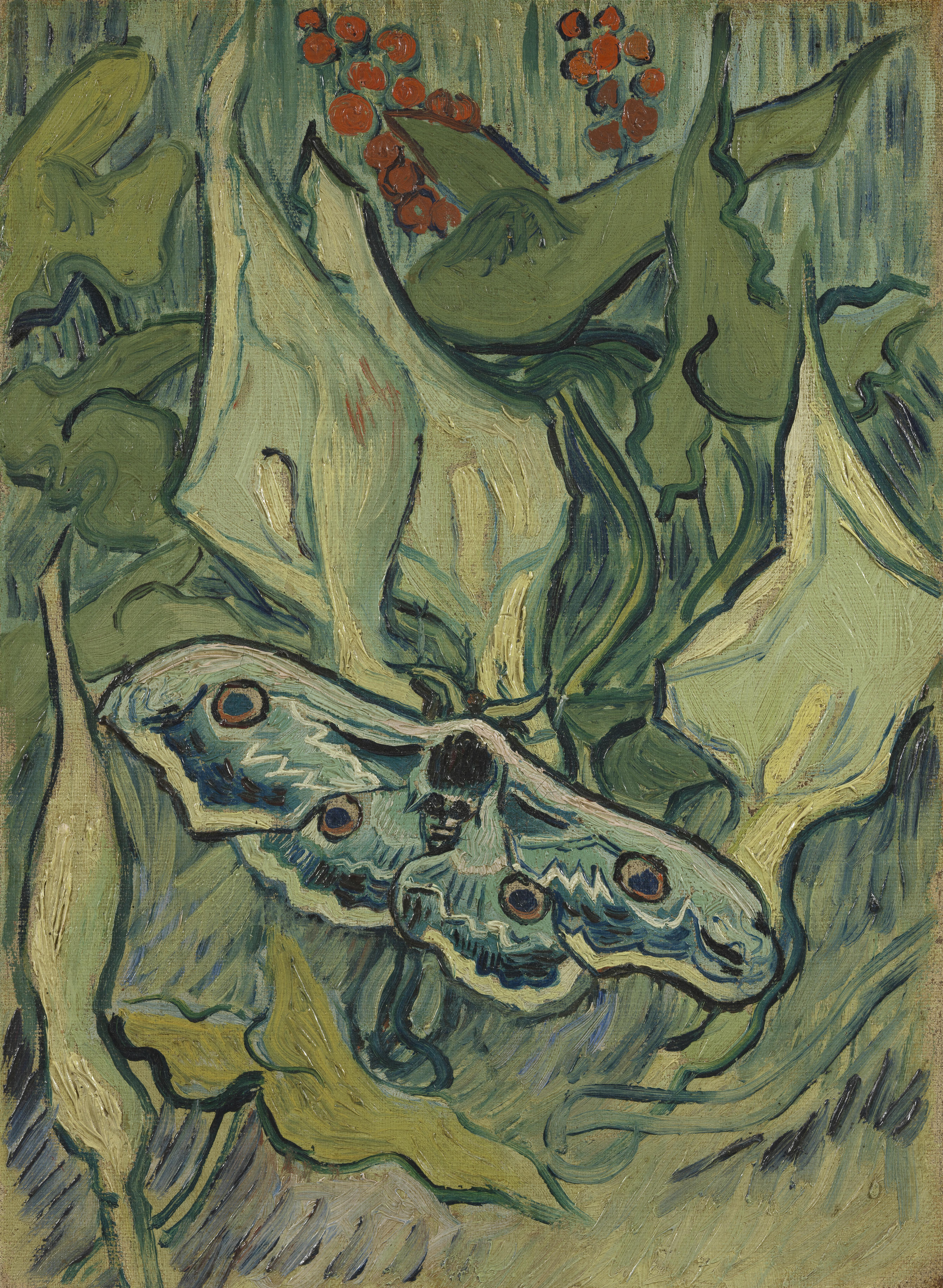
Giant Peacock Moth on Arum by Vincent van Gogh, 1889
