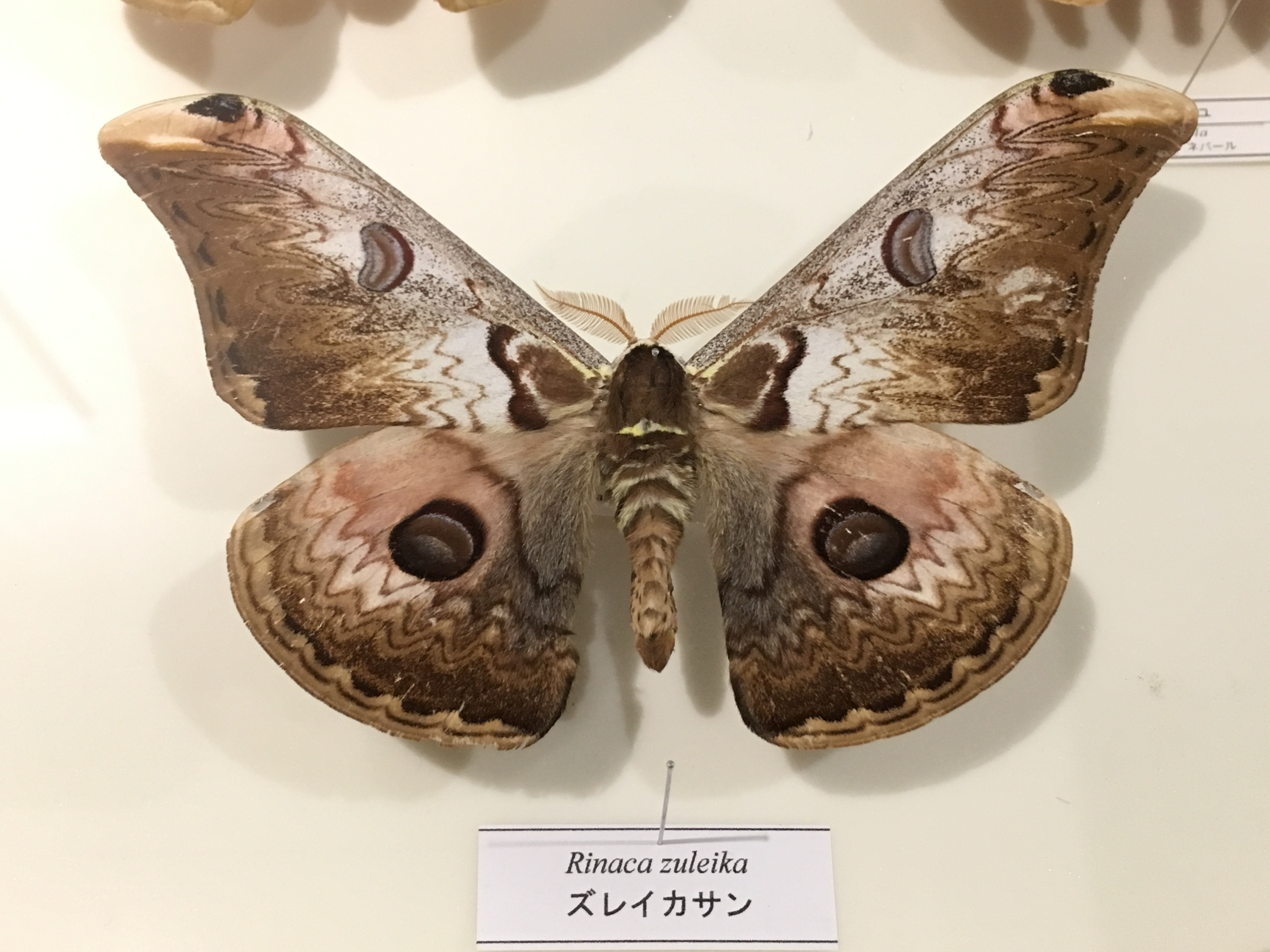

Scientific classification
- Domain: Eukaryota
- Kingdom: Animalia
- Phylum: Arthropoda
- Class: Insecta
- Order: Lepidoptera
- Family: Saturniidae
- Genus: Saturnia
- Species: S. zuleika

Binomial name
- Saturnia zuleika Hope, 1843

Synonyms
- Saturnia (Rinaca) zuleika Hope, 1843; Caligula zuleika (Hope, 1843); Neoris zuleika (Hope, 1843); Rinaca zuleika (Hope, 1843)

= Saturnia zuleika =

Species of moth

Saturnia zuleika (commonly referred to as Neoris zuleika) is a moth of the family Saturniidae. It is found in India and West Bengal within the Himalayan Mountains, usually at elevations from 600 m - 3200 m.

== Description ==
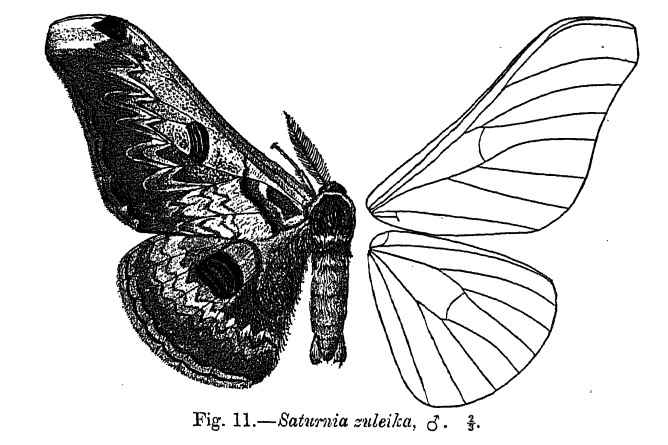
Male upperside with wing venation

Saturnia zuleika can be defined from other similar species—such as Saturnia lesoudieri—by the inward-curving eyespots on its hindwings. Also, their larvae have differently shaped eyespots and sexual organs in the case of males.
