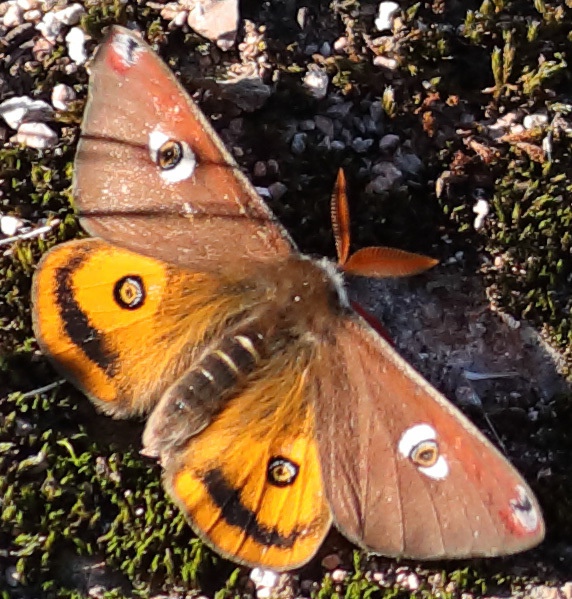

Scientific classification
- Kingdom: Animalia
- Phylum: Arthropoda
- Clade: Pancrustacea
- Class: Insecta
- Order: Lepidoptera
- Family: Saturniidae
- Tribe: Saturniini
- Genus: Calosaturnia
- Species: C. mendocino

Binomial name
- Calosaturnia mendocino (Behrens, 1876)

Synonyms
- Saturnia mendocino Behrens, 1876

= Calosaturnia mendocino =

Species of moth

Calosaturnia mendocino, commonly known as the Mendocino saturnia moth, is a species of silkmoth in the family Saturniidae. It was first described as Saturnia mendocino by Behrens in 1876. It is endemic to California in the United States
