= Calosaturnia walterorum =

Scientific classification
- Kingdom: Animalia
- Phylum: Arthropoda
- Clade: Pancrustacea
- Class: Insecta
- Order: Lepidoptera
- Family: Saturniidae
- Tribe: Saturniini
- Genus: Calosaturnia
- Species: C. walterorum

Binomial name
- Calosaturnia walterorum (Hogue & Johnson, 1958)

Synonyms
- Saturnia walterorum Hogue & Johnson, 1938; Calosaturnia meridionalis Johnson, 1940; Saturnia meridionalis (Johnson, 1940)

Species of moth

Calosaturniaa walterorum, or Walter's saturnia moth, is a species of silkmoth in the family Saturniidae. It is found in the United States, California and ranges into Mexico.
