= Calosaturnia albofasciata =

Scientific classification
- Kingdom: Animalia
- Phylum: Arthropoda
- Clade: Pancrustacea
- Class: Insecta
- Order: Lepidoptera
- Family: Saturniidae
- Tribe: Saturniini
- Genus: Calosaturnia
- Species: C. albofasciata

Binomial name
- Calosaturnia albofasciata Johnson, 1938

Synonyms
- Saturnia albofasciata (Johnson, 1938)

Species of moth

Calosaturnia albofasciata, the white-streaked saturnia moth, is a species of silkmoth in the family Saturniidae. It is endemic to California, US.
