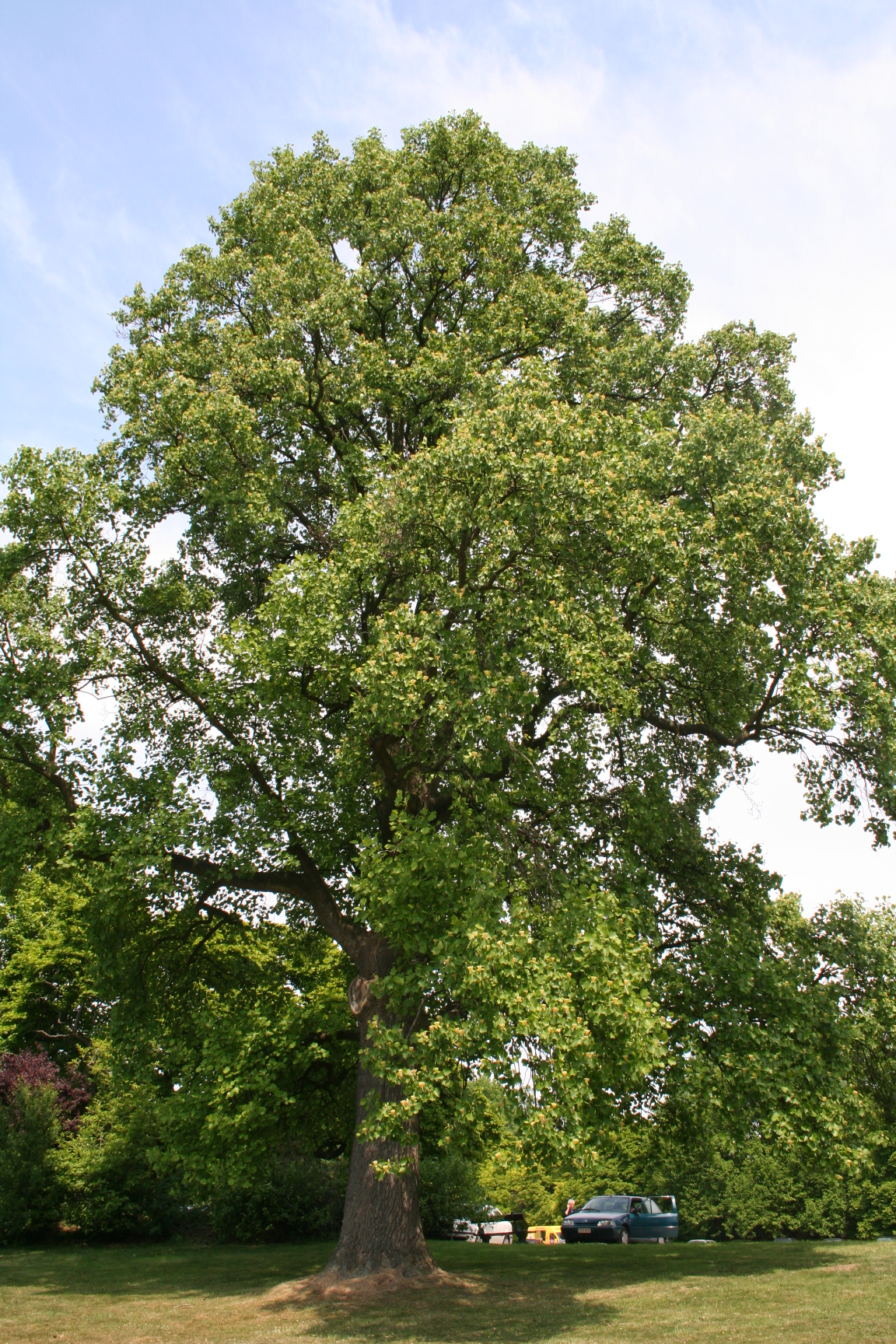
- Liriodendron tulipifera cultivated at Laken Park in Belgium
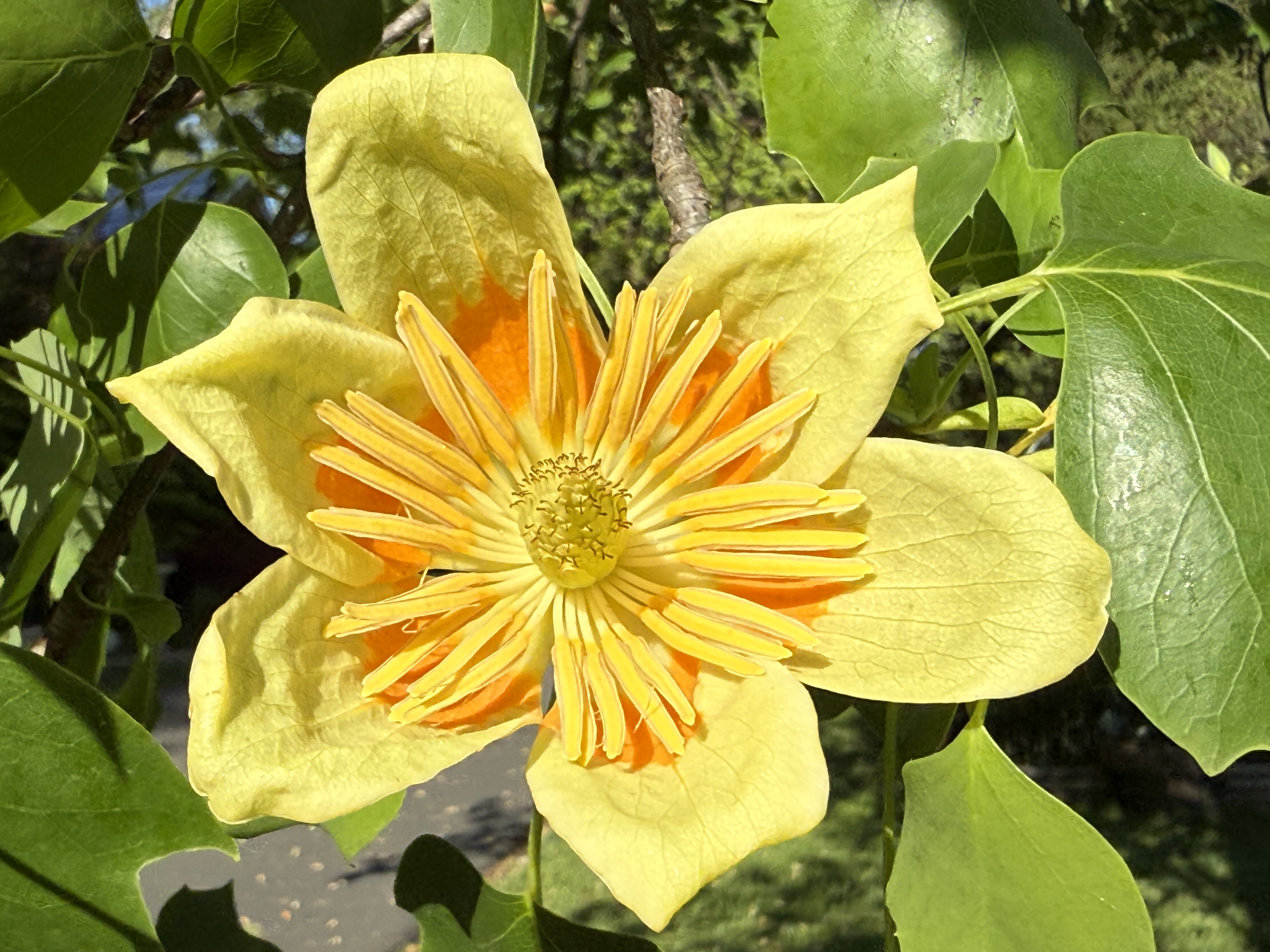
- L. tulipifera flower

Conservation status
- Least Concern (IUCN 3.1)

Scientific classification
- Kingdom: Plantae
- Clade: Embryophytes
- Clade: Tracheophytes
- Clade: Angiosperms
- Clade: Magnoliids
- Order: Magnoliales
- Family: Magnoliaceae
- Genus: Liriodendron
- Species: L. tulipifera

Binomial name
- Liriodendron tulipifera L.
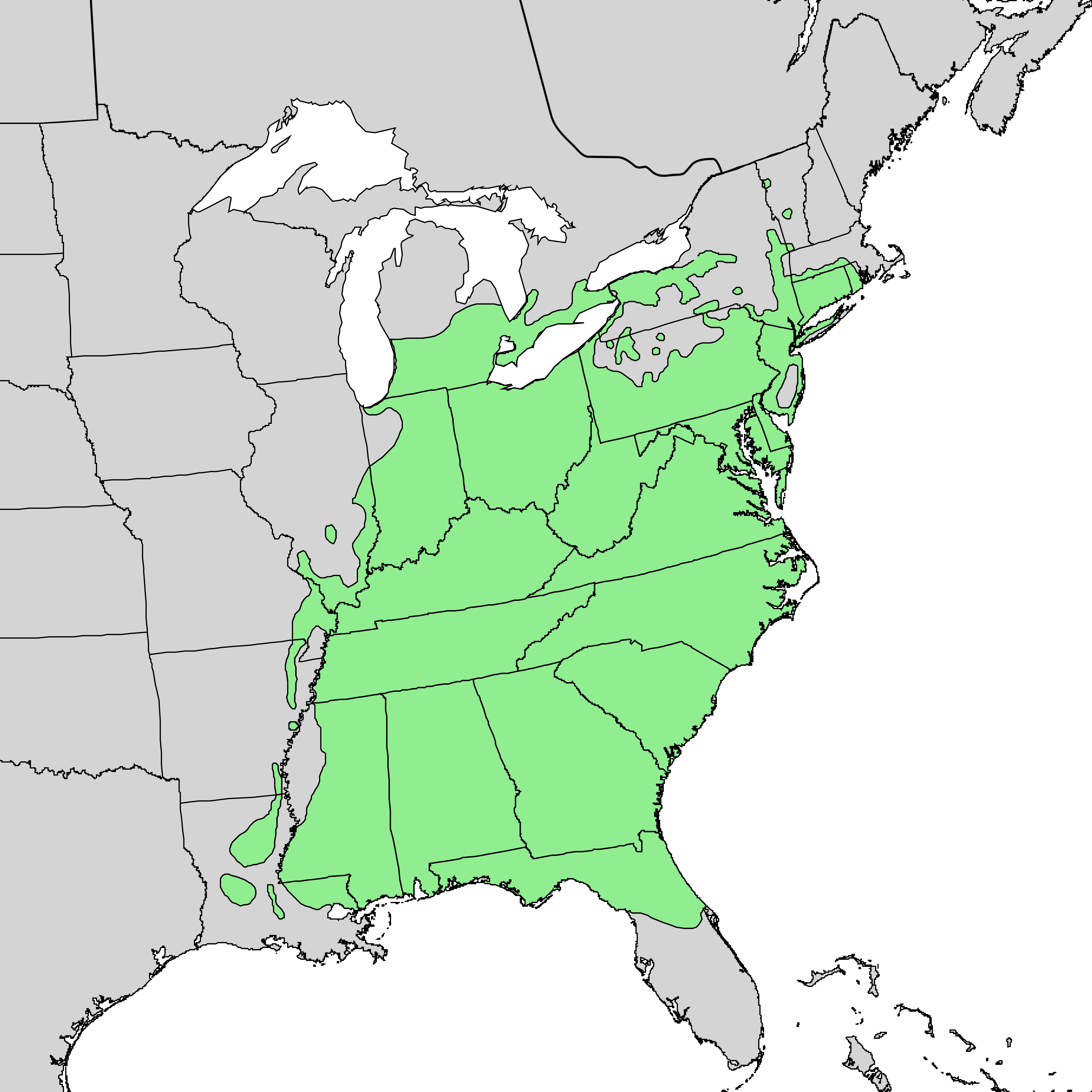
- Range

Synonyms
- Liriodendron fastigiatum Dippel; Liriodendron procera Salisb.; Liriodendron truncatifolium Stokes; Tulipifera liriodendron Mill.

= Liriodendron tulipifera =

Species of tree

Liriodendron tulipifera—known as the tulip tree, (Note: Another tree with this common name is the saucer magnolia, Magnolia × soulangeana) American tulip tree, tulipwood, tuliptree, tulip poplar, whitewood, fiddletree, lynn-tree, hickory-poplar, and yellow-poplar—is the North American representative of the two-species genus Liriodendron (the other member is Liriodendron chinense). It is native to eastern North America from Southern Ontario and possibly southern Quebec west to Illinois, and east to southwestern Massachusetts, then south to central Florida and Louisiana.

The tulip tree is the tallest tree of the Nearctic temperate deciduous forest. It can grow to more than 50 m (160 ft) in virgin cove forests of the Appalachian Mountains, often with no limbs until it reaches 25–30 m (80–100 ft) in height, making it a very valuable timber tree.

This species is also fast-growing, without the common problems of weak wood strength and short lifespan often seen in fast-growing species. In 2024, researchers from the University of Cambridge explained the anatomical factors and evolutionary history behind its unusual combination of rapid growth and strong wood. The researchers proposed to call tulip tree lumber "midwood," a new category of wood distinct from hardwood and softwood.

The tulip tree is the state tree of Indiana, Kentucky, and Tennessee.

== Description ==
The tulip tree is one of the largest of the native trees of eastern North America, known in an extraordinary case to reach the height of 58.5 m (192 ft) with the next-tallest known specimens in the 52–54 m (170–177 ft) range. These heights are comparable to the very tallest known eastern white pines, another species often described as the tallest in eastern North America.

The trunk on large examples is typically 1.2–1.8 m (4–6 ft) in diameter, though it can grow much broader. Its ordinary height is 24–46 m (80–150 ft) and it tends to have a pyramidal crown. It prefers deep, rich, and rather moist soil; it is common throughout the Southern United States. Growth is fairly rapid.

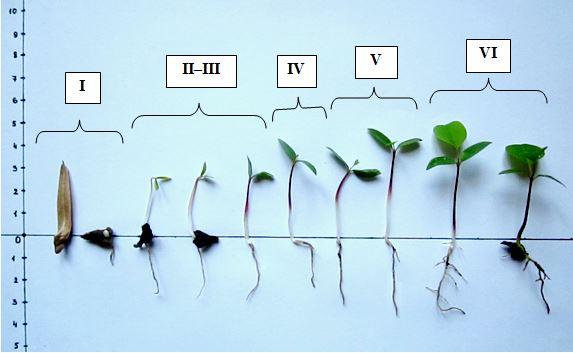
Morphological changes of seedlings of tulip tree in the process of ontogenesis.

The bark is brown, furrowed, aromatic and bitter. The branchlets are smooth, and lustrous, initially reddish, maturing to dark gray, and finally brown. The wood is light yellow to brown, and the sapwood creamy white; light, soft, brittle, close, straight-grained. Specific gravity: 0.4230; density: 422 g/dm^{3} (26.36 lb/cu ft).

Winter buds are dark red, covered with a bloom, obtuse; scales becoming conspicuous stipules for the unfolding leaf, and persistent until the leaf is fully grown. Flower-bud enclosed in a two-valved, caducous bract.

The alternate leaves are simple, pinnately veined, measuring 125–150 mm (5–6 in) long and wide. They have four lobes, and are heart-shaped or truncate or slightly wedge-shaped at base, entire, and the apex cut across at a shallow angle, making the upper part of the leaf look square; midrib and primary veins prominent. They come out of the bud recurved by the bending down of the petiole near the middle bringing the apex of the folded leaf to the base of the bud, light green, when full grown are bright green, smooth and shining above, paler green beneath, with downy veins. In autumn they turn a clear, bright yellow. Petiole long, slender, angled.

April marks the start of the flowering period in the Southern United States (except as noted below); trees at the northern limit of cultivation begin to flower in June. The flowers are pale green or yellow (rarely white), with an orange band on the tepals; they yield large quantities of nectar.

- Flowers: May. Perfect, solitary, terminal, greenish yellow, borne on stout peduncles, 40–50 mm (1 1/2–2 in) long, cup-shaped, erect, conspicuous. The bud is enclosed in a sheath of two triangular bracts which fall as the blossom opens.
- Calyx: Sepals three, imbricate in bud, reflexed or spreading, somewhat veined, early deciduous.
- Corolla: Cup-shaped, petals six, 50 mm (2 in) long, in two rows, imbricate, hypogynous, greenish yellow, marked toward the base with yellow. Somewhat fleshy in texture.
- Stamens: Indefinite, imbricate in many ranks on the base of the receptacle; filaments thread-like, short; anthers extrorse, long, two-celled, adnate; cells opening longitudinally.
- Pistils: Indefinite, imbricate on the long slender receptacle. Ovary one-celled; style acuminate, flattened; stigma short, one-sided, recurved; ovules two.
- Fruit: Narrow light brown cone, formed from many overlapping samaras which are dispersed by wind, leaving the axis persistent all winter. September, October.

Harriet Louise Keeler provided a description of the tulip tree in Our Native Trees and How to Identify Them. (Note: "The leaves are of unusual shape and develop in a most peculiar and characteristic manner. The leaf-buds are composed of scales as is usual, and these scales grow with the growing shoot. In this respect the buds do not differ from those of many other trees, but what is peculiar is that each pair of scales develops so as to form an oval envelope which contains the young leaf and protects it against changing temperatures until it is strong enough to sustain them without injury. When it has reached that stage the bracts separate, the tiny leaf comes out carefully folded along the line of the midrib, opens as it matures, and until it becomes full grown the bracts do duty as stipules, becoming an inch [25 mm] or more in length before they fall. The leaf is unique in shape, its apex is cut off at the end in a way peculiarly its own, the petioles are long, angled, and so poised that the leaves flutter independently, and their glossy surfaces so catch and toss the light that the effect of the foliage as a whole is much brighter than it otherwise would be. The flowers are large, brilliant, and on detached trees numerous. Their color is greenish yellow with dashes of red and orange, and their resemblance to a tulip very marked. They do not droop from the spray but sit erect. The fruit is a cone 5 to 8 cm (2 to 3 in) long, made of a great number of thin narrow scales attached to a common axis. These scales are each a carpel surrounded by a thin membranous ring. Each cone contains sixty or seventy of these scales, of which only a few are productive. These fruit cones remain on the tree in varied states of dilapidation throughout the winter.")

=== Gallery ===
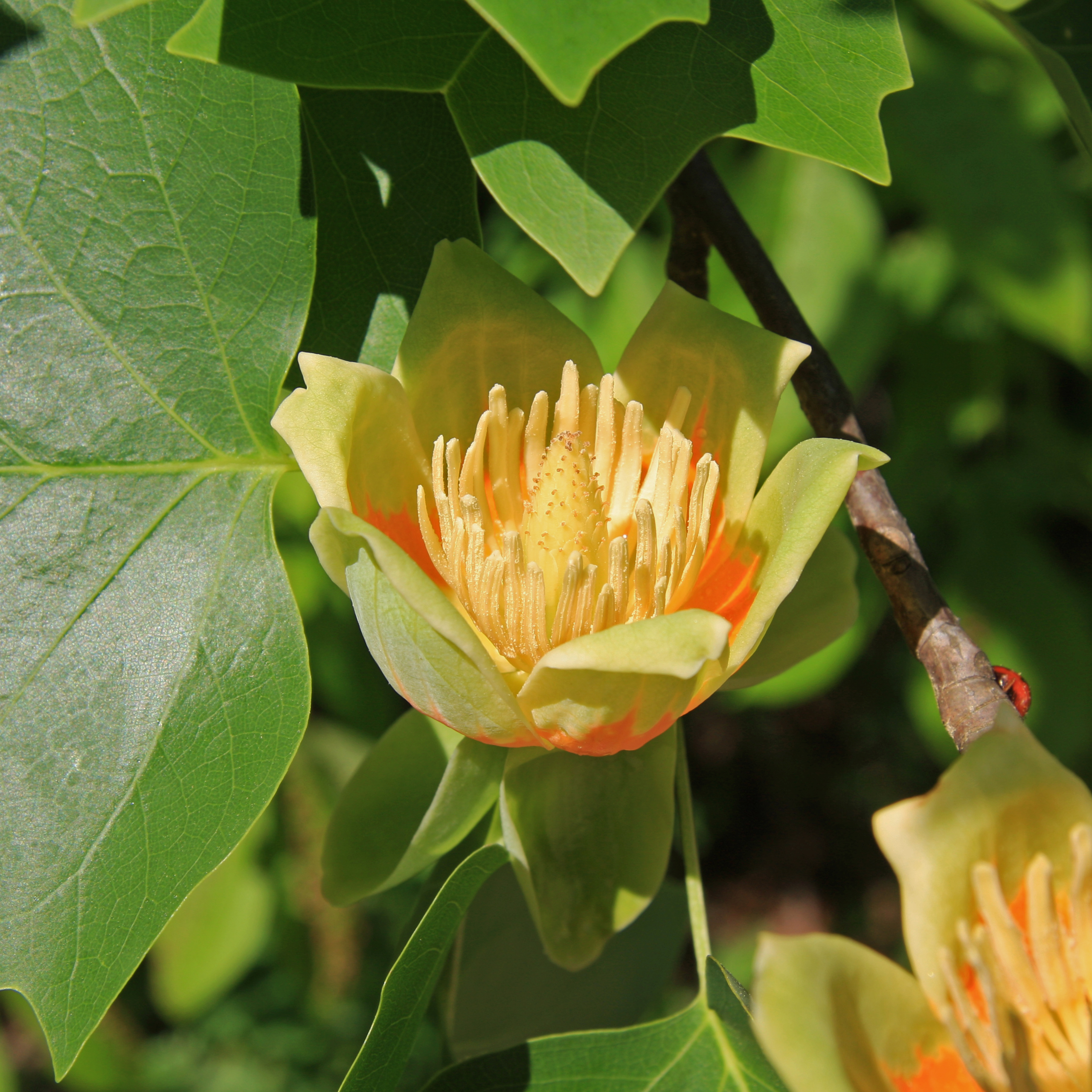
Tulip-like flower

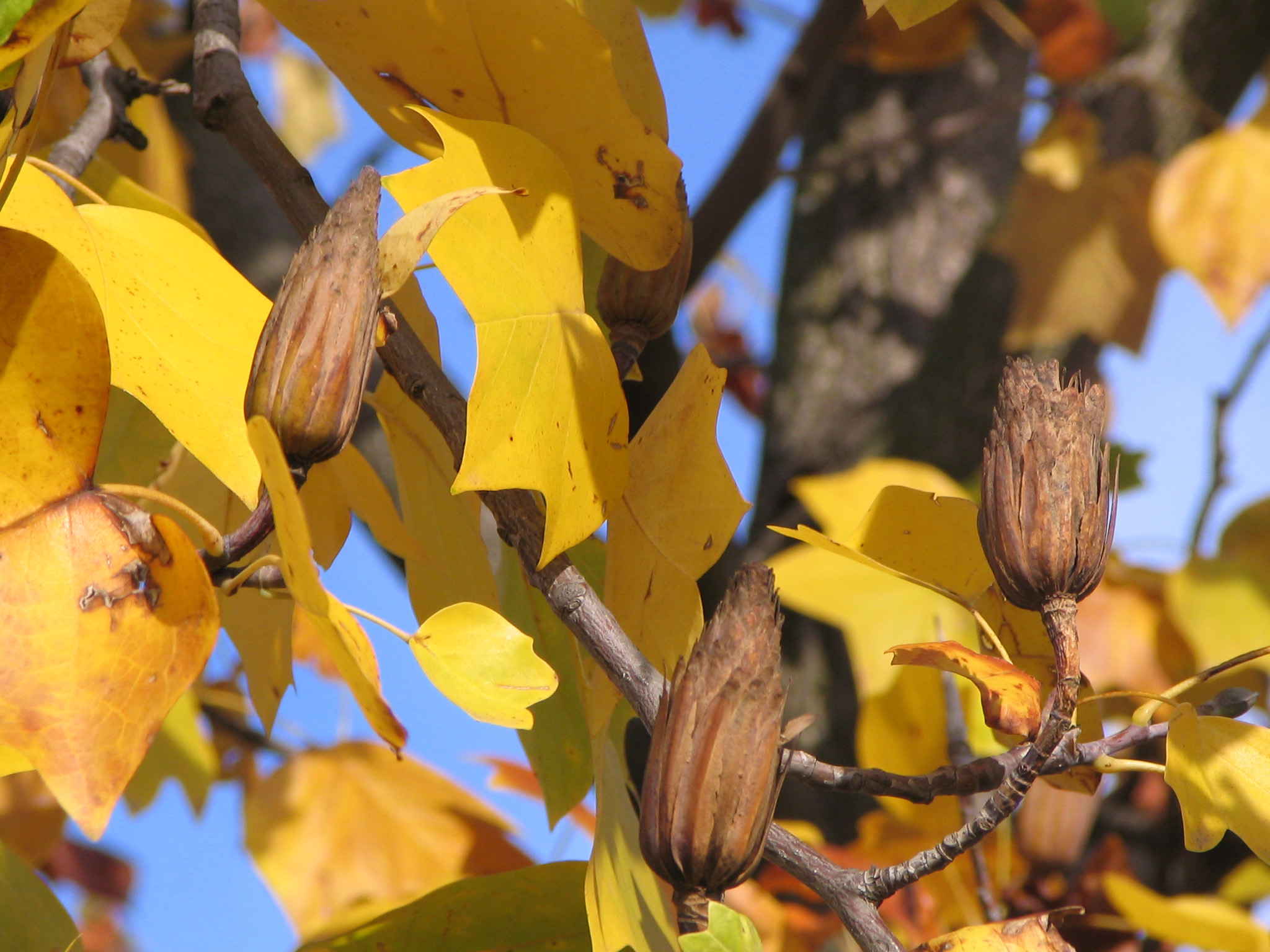
Golden autumn leaves and seed cones

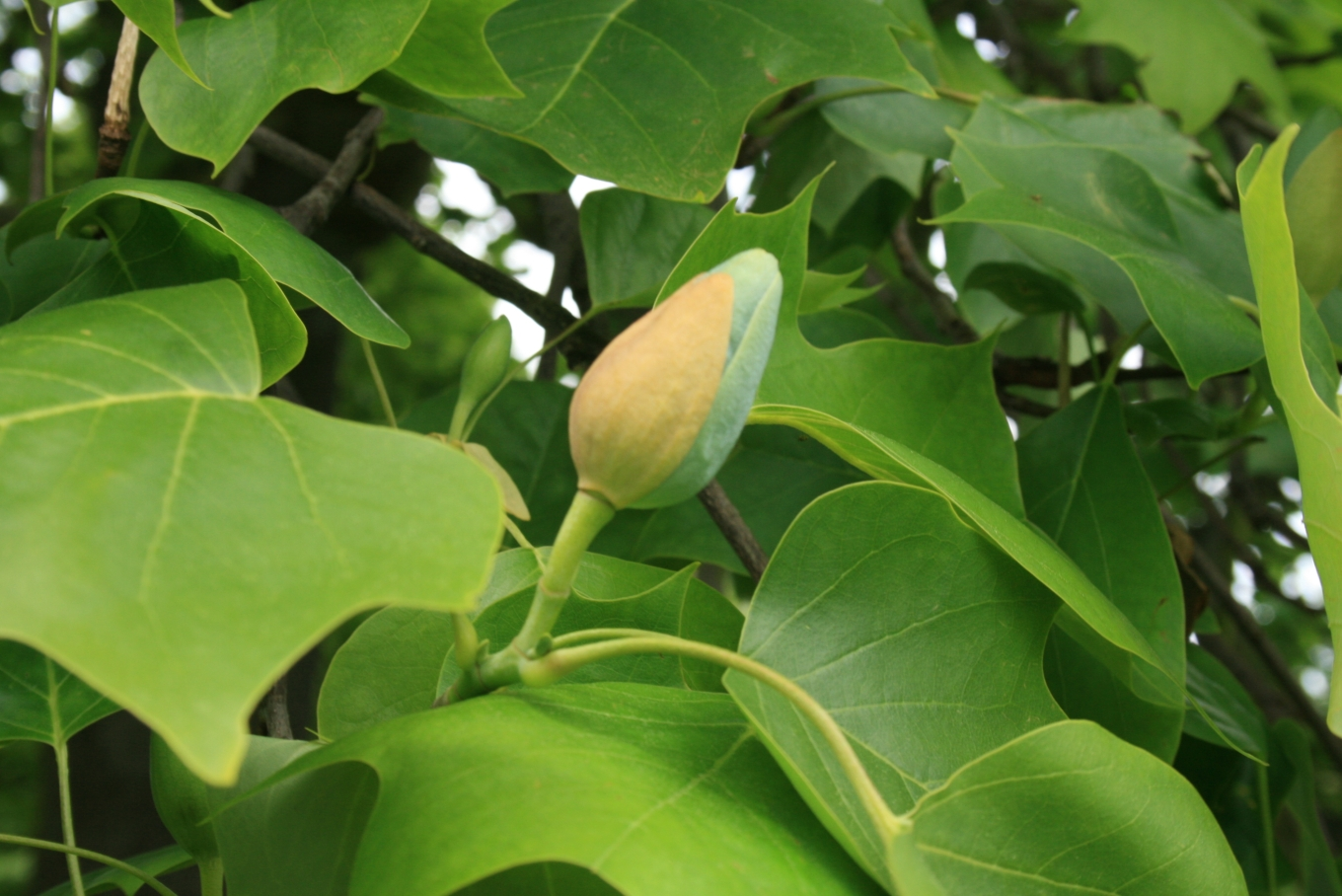
Large gray-green flower bud with yellow bract

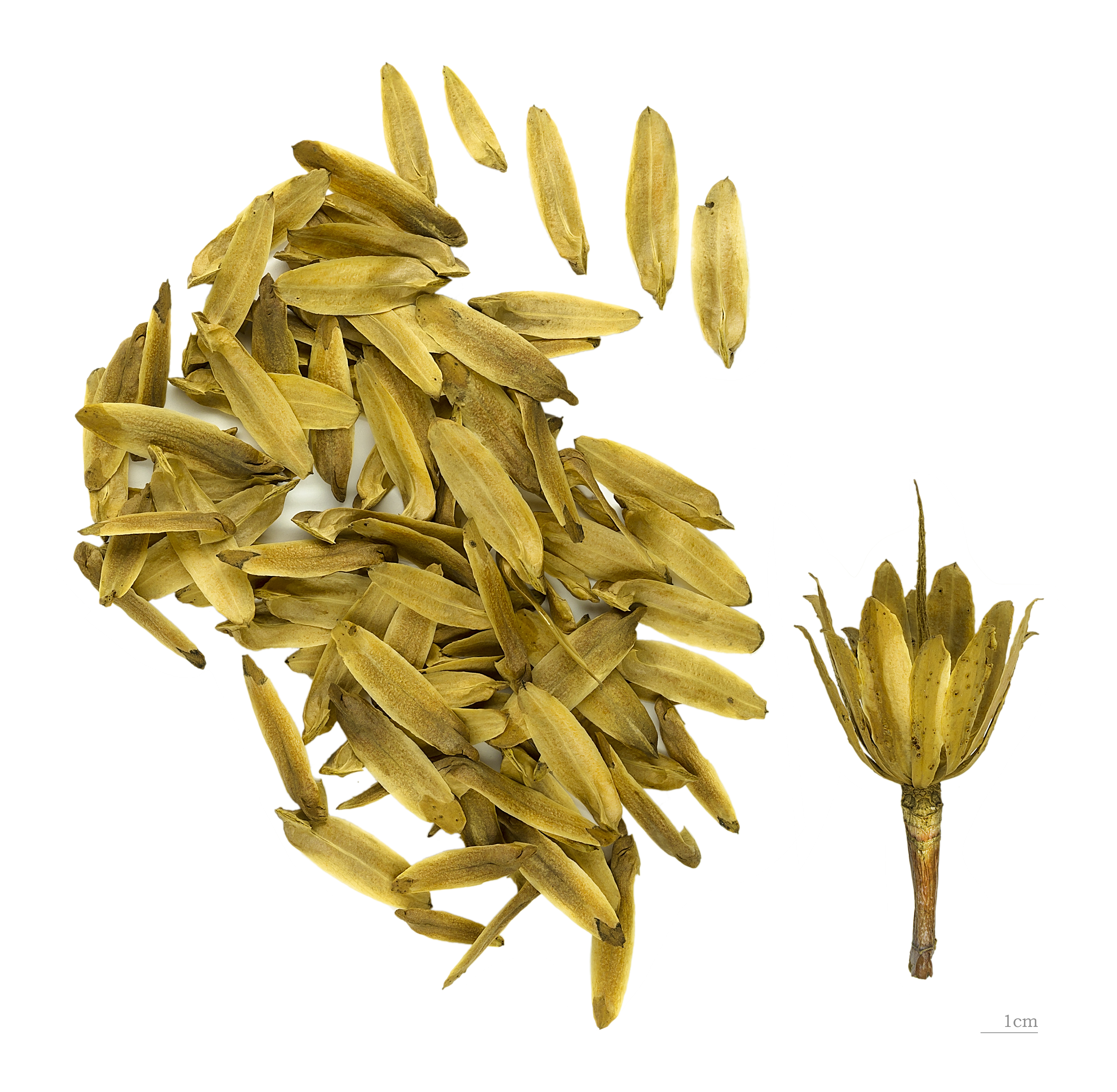
Seeds

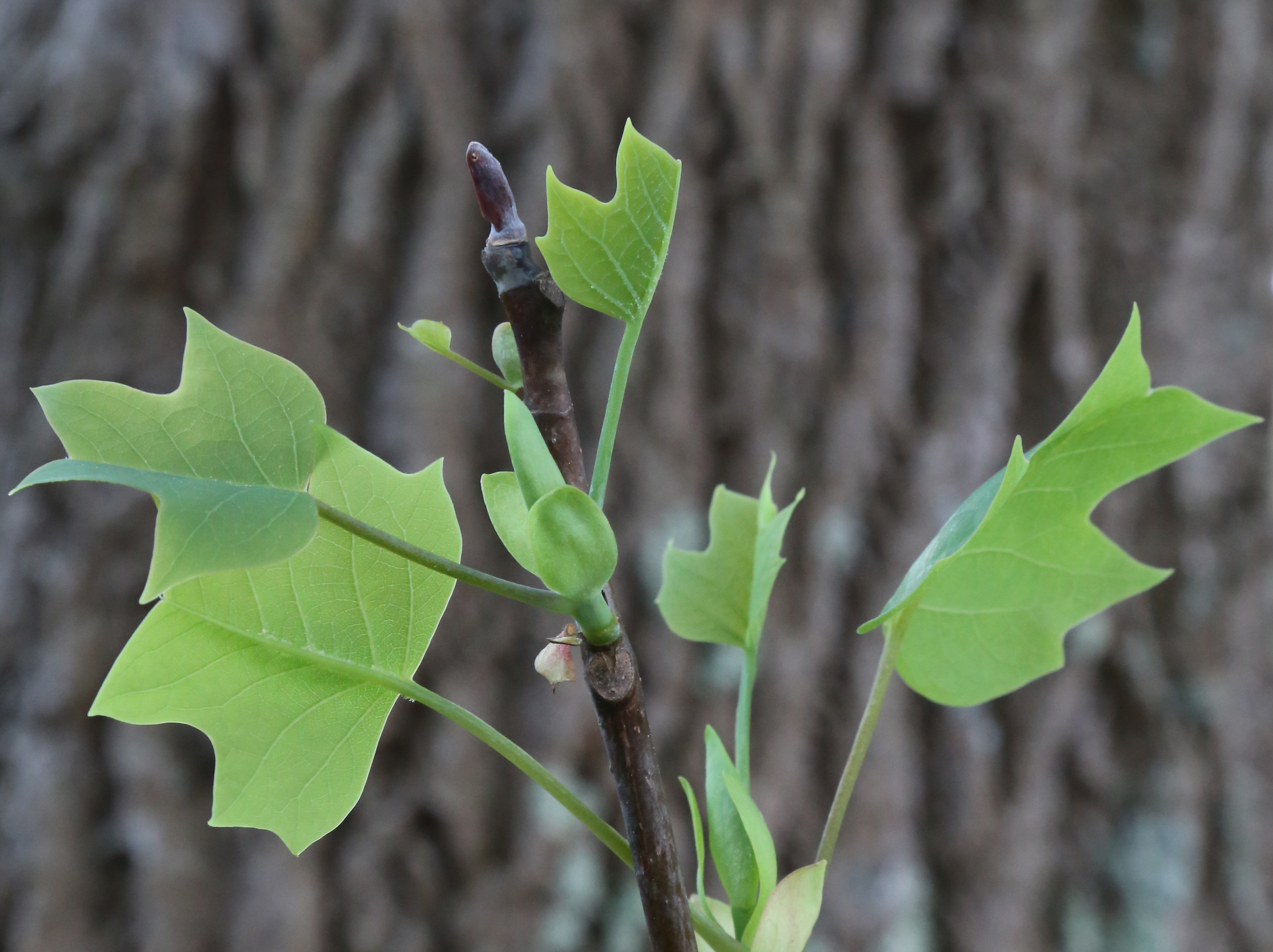
Unfolding leaves

Lobed leaf

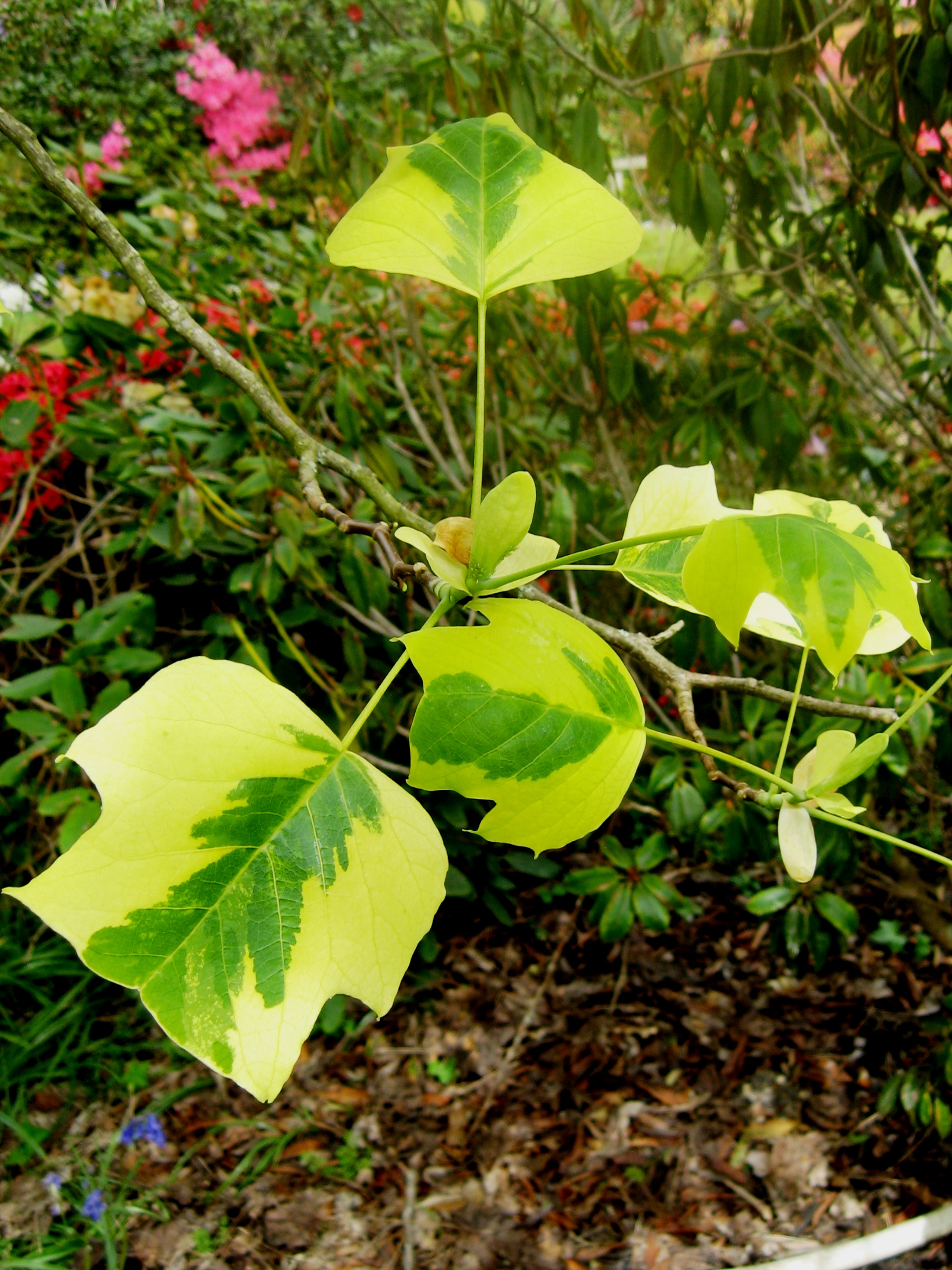
Leaves of cultivar 'Aureomarginatum'

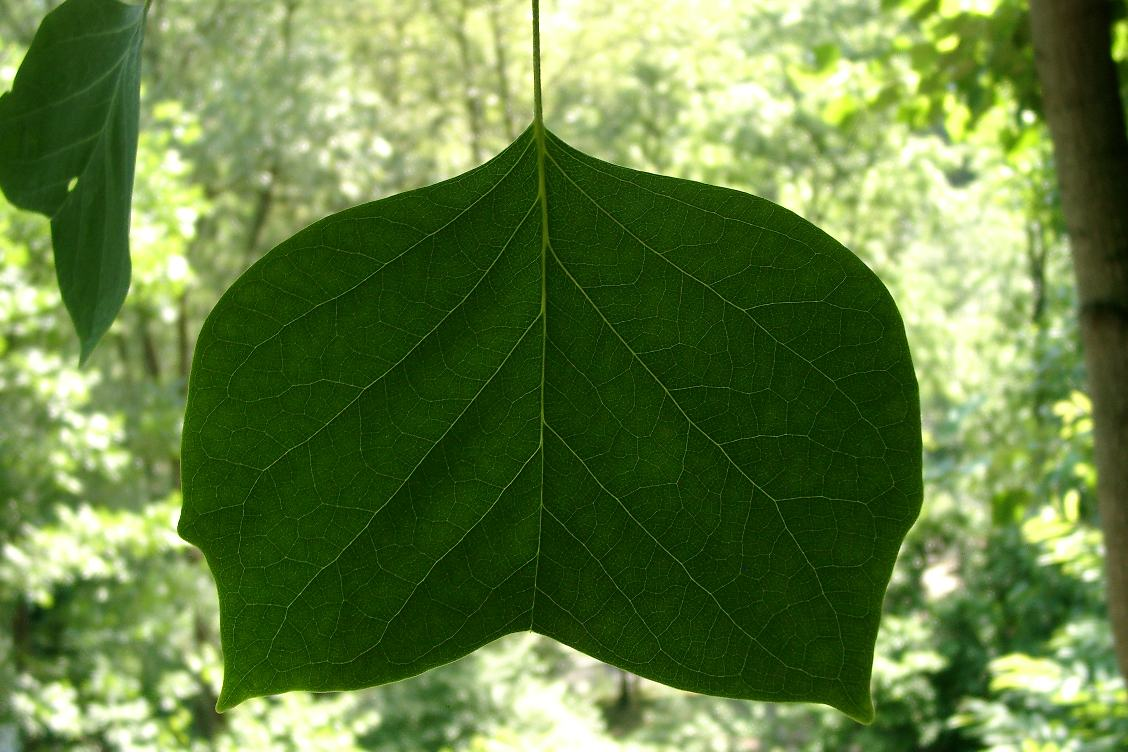
Leaf of cultivar "Integrifolium"

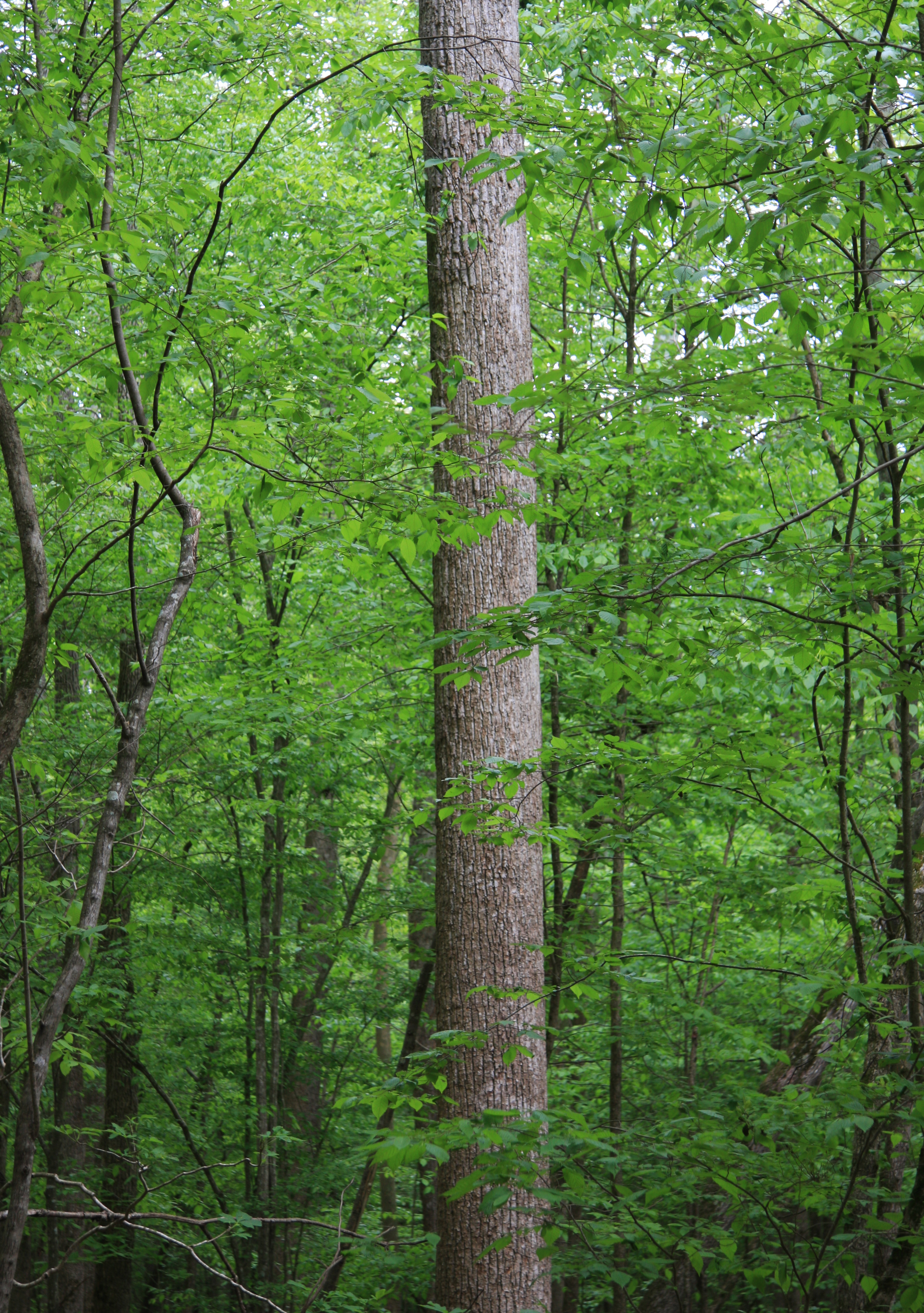
Columnar trunk in streambank woods

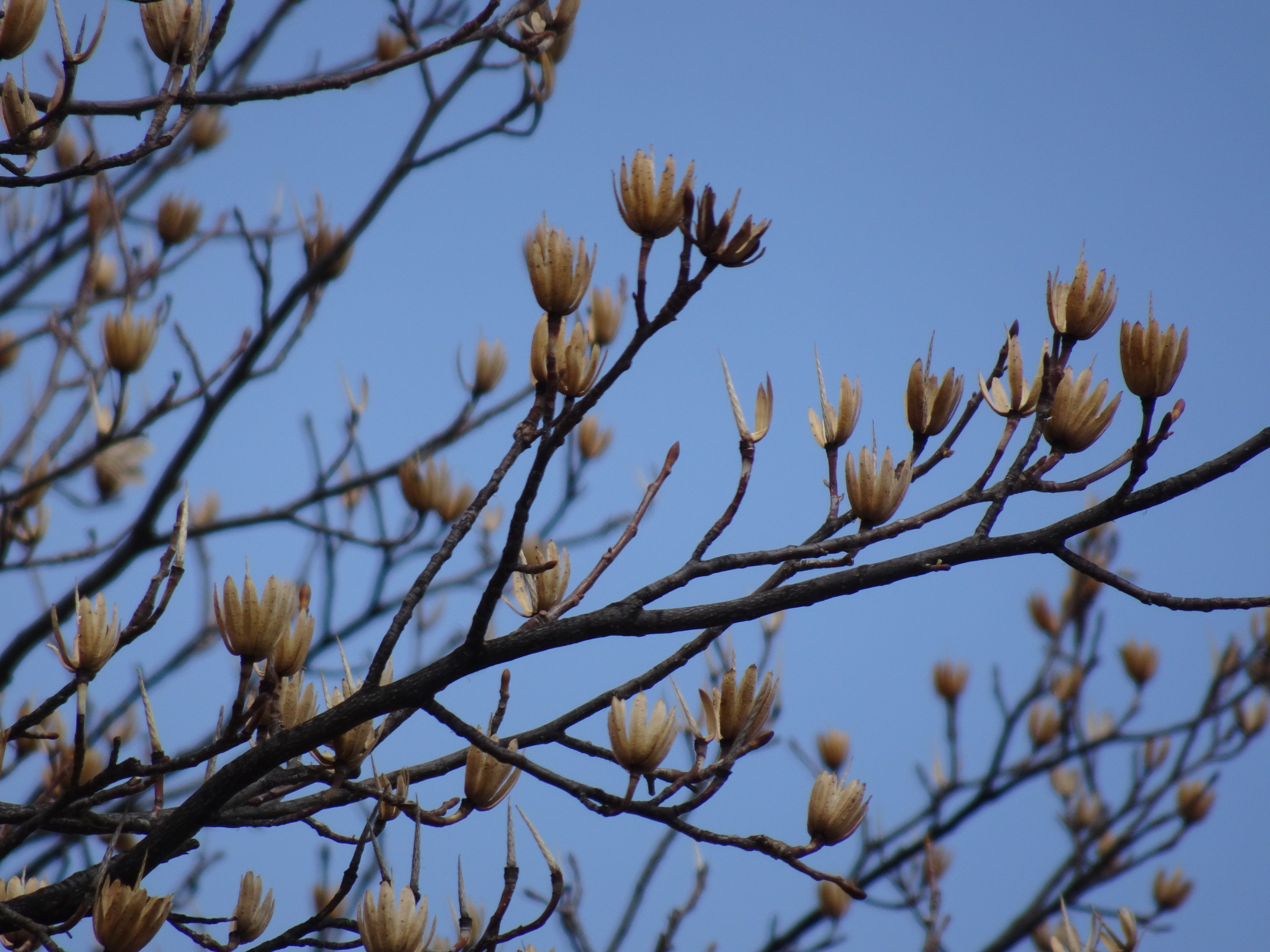
Fruit

Imperial moth camouflaged on leaf

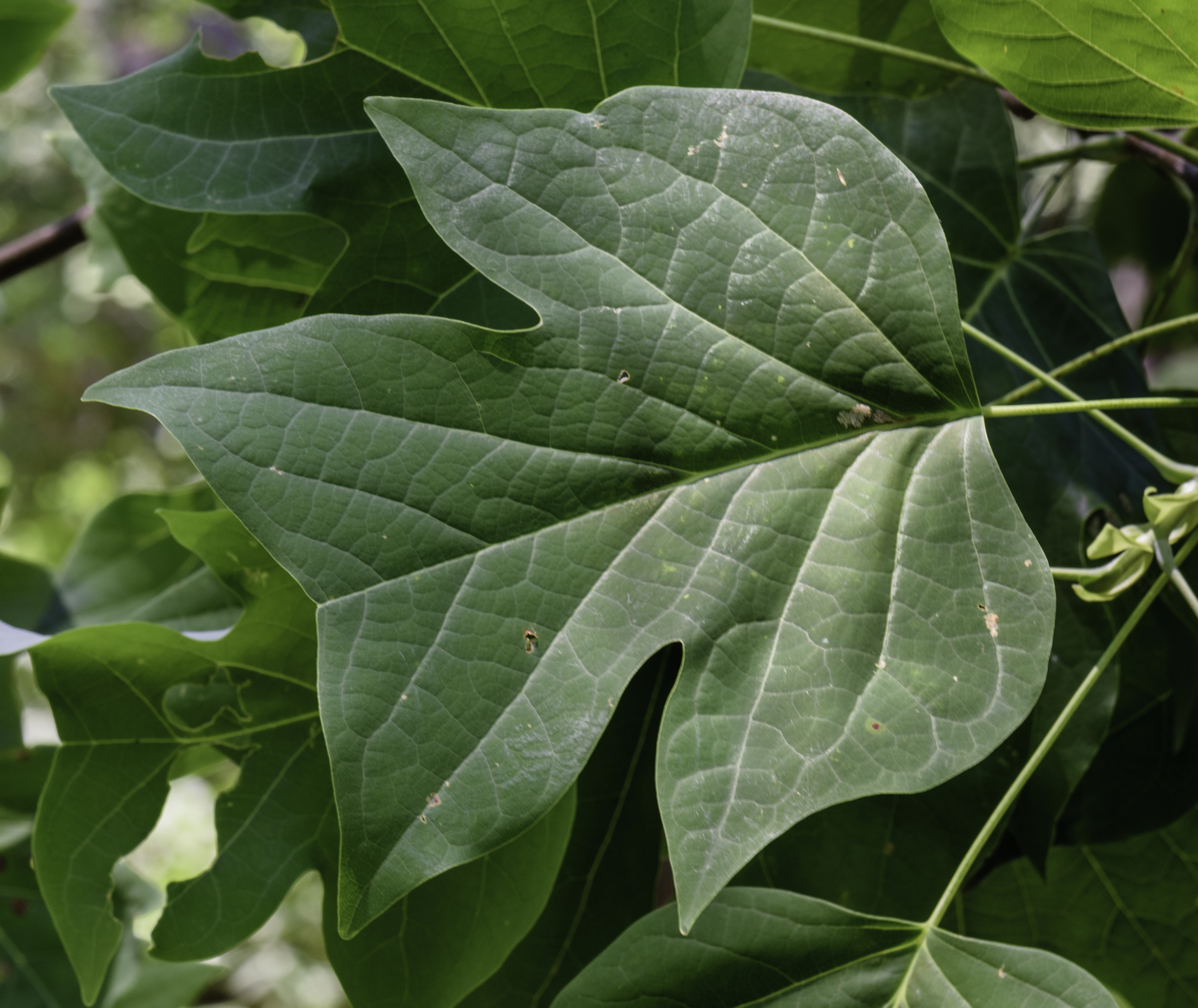
Leaf

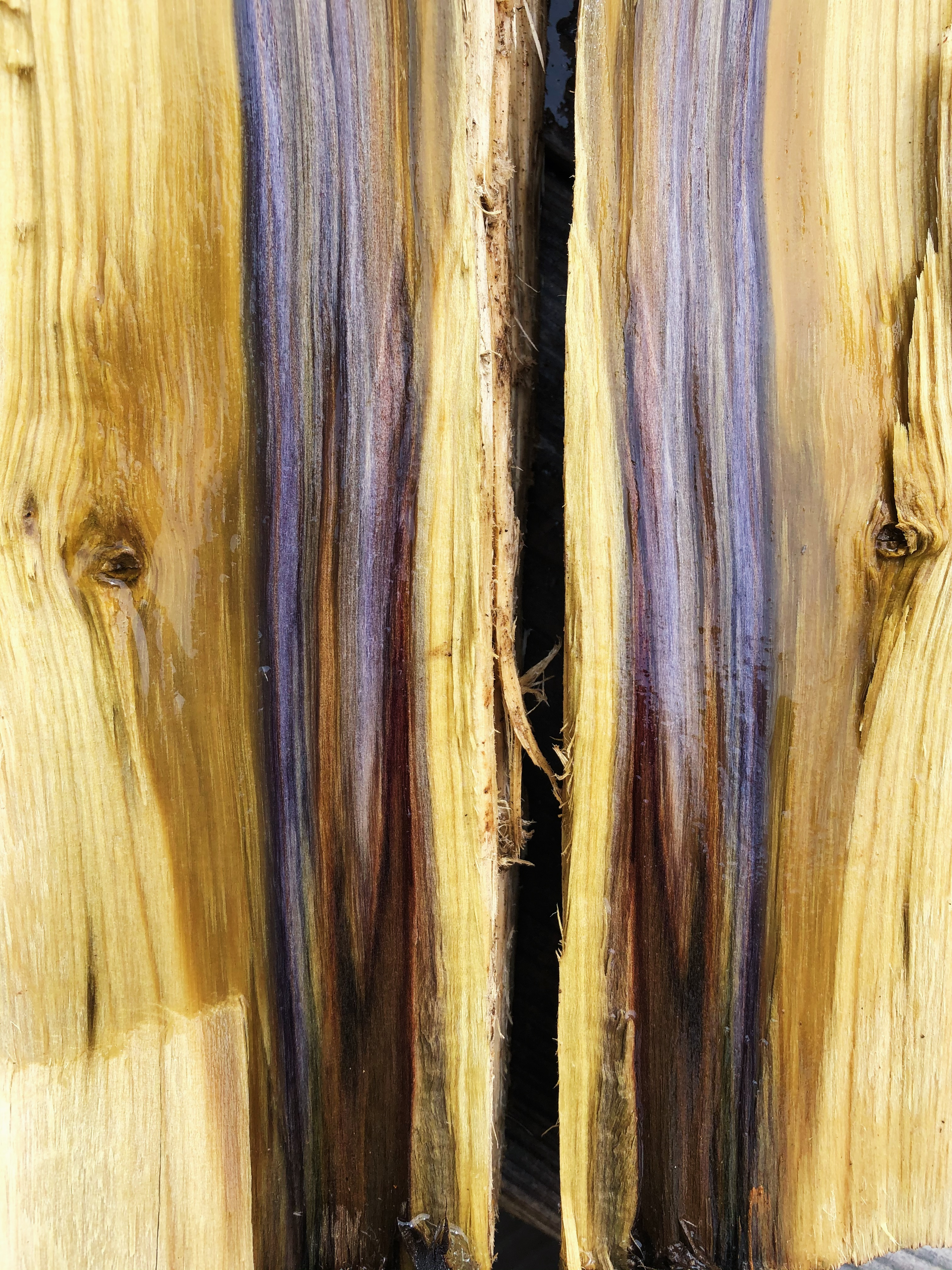
Mineral stain in fresh-split wood

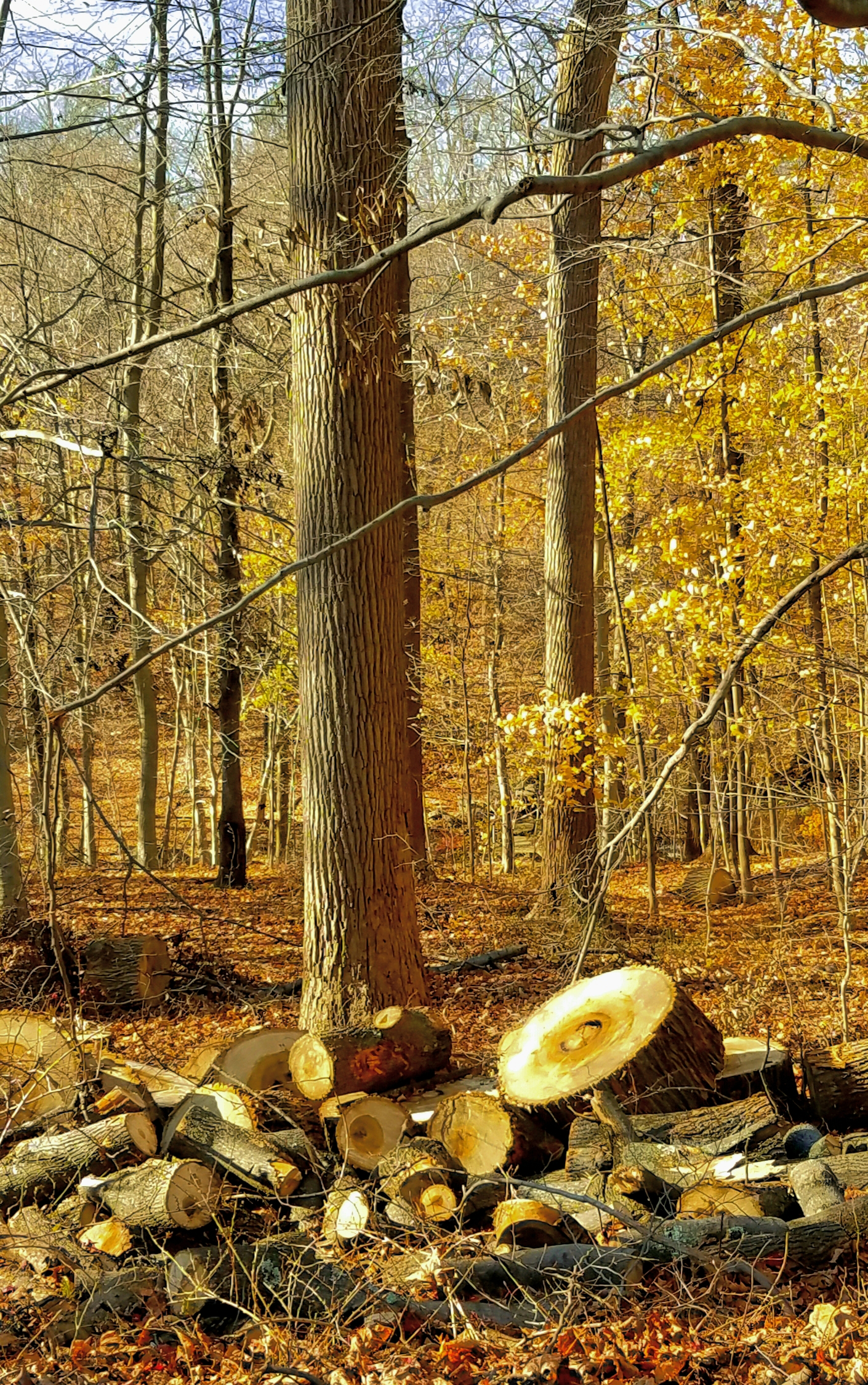
Cut wood

== Taxonomy ==
Originally described by Carl Linnaeus, Liriodendron tulipifera is one of two species (see also L. chinense) in the genus Liriodendron in the magnolia family. The name Liriodendron is Greek for "lily tree". It is also called the tuliptree Magnolia, or sometimes, by the lumber industry, as the tulip-poplar or yellow-poplar. However, it is not closely related to true lilies, tulips or poplars.

The tulip tree has impressed itself upon popular attention in many ways, and consequently has many common names. The tree's traditional name in the Miami-Illinois language is oonseentia. Native Americans so habitually made their dugout canoes of its trunk that the early settlers west of the Appalachian Mountains called it Canoewood. The color of its wood gives it the name Whitewood. In areas near the Mississippi River it is called a poplar largely because of the fluttering habits of its leaves, in which it resembles trees of that genus. It is sometimes called "fiddle tree," because its peculiar leaves, with their arched bases and in-cut sides, suggest the violin shape.

The external resemblance of its flowers to tulips named it the Tulip-tree. In their internal structure, however, they are quite different. Instead of the triple arrangements of stamens and pistil parts, they have indefinite numbers arranged in spirals.

== Distribution and habitat ==
In the Cretaceous age the genus was represented by several species, and was widely distributed over North America and Europe. Its remains are also found in Tertiary rocks.

Today the tulip tree is one of the largest and most valuable hardwoods of eastern North America, thriving in temperate deciduous forests east of the Mississippi River. Its indeterminate pattern of continued growth in the latter month of the growing season can cause this species to be more susceptible to droughts and cease shoot growth after July in drier climates. It prefers mesic to moist, well-drained soils and is generally most common at low to mid-elevations, for example usually not found above 3000 ft (900m) elevation in Virginia. It is native from southern Ontario and northern Ohio south to the Gulf of Mexico and from extreme southern New York and Connecticut south to Louisiana and northern Florida. It extends south to north Florida, and has few natural populations west of the Mississippi River, but beyond its native areas it is found occasionally as ornamentals or escapes. Its finest development is in the Southern Appalachian mountains, where trees may exceed 50 m (170 ft) in height. It was introduced into Great Britain before 1688 in Bishop Compton's garden at Fulham Palace and is now a popular ornamental in streets, parks, and large gardens. The Appalachian Mountains and adjacent Piedmont running south from Pennsylvania to Georgia contained 75 percent of all yellow-poplar growing stock in 1974.

=== East Central Florida ecotype ===
Parts of east-central Florida near Orlando have an ecotype with similar-looking leaves to the coastal plain variant of the Carolinas; it flowers much earlier (usually in March, although flowering can begin in late January), with a smaller yellower bloom than other types. This east central Florida ecotype/Peninsular allozyme group seems to have the best ability to tolerate very wet conditions, where it may grow short pencil-like root structures (pneumatophores) similar to those produced by other swamp trees in warm climates. Superior resistance to drought, pests and wind is also noted. Some individuals retain their leaves all year unless a hard frost strikes. Places where it may be seen include Dr. Howard A. Kelly Park, Lake Eola Park, Spring Hammock Preserve, Seminole State Forest, Big Tree Park and the University of Central Florida

Plant Notes for Liriodendron tulipifera in the Atlas of Florida Plants, USF Libraries note that "Fetter & Weakley (2019) explored the genetic structure of the species and suggested that the Florida peninsula populations should be recognized as a subspecies".

In the Herbarium Specimen Details in the Atlas for Liriodendron, specimens collected where the peninsula populations naturally occurred are identified as var. "Australis".

== Ecology ==
Liriodendron tulipifera is generally considered to be a shade-intolerant species that is most commonly associated with the first century of forest succession. In Appalachian forests, it is a dominant species during the 50–150 years of succession, but is absent or rare in stands of trees 500 years or older. One particular group of trees survived in the grounds of Orlagh College, Dublin for 200 years, before having to be cut down in 1990. On mesic, fertile soils, it often forms pure or nearly pure stands. It can and does persist in older forests when there is sufficient disturbance to generate large enough gaps for regeneration. Individual trees have been known to live for up to around 500 years.

All young tulip trees and most mature specimens are intolerant of prolonged inundation; however, a coastal plain swamp ecotype in the southeastern United States is relatively flood-tolerant. This ecotype is recognized by its blunt-lobed leaves, which may have a red tint. Liriodendron tulipifera produces a large amount of seed, which is dispersed by wind. The seeds typically travel a distance equal to 4–5 times the height of the tree, and remain viable for 4–7 years. The seeds are not one of the most important food sources for wildlife, but they are eaten by a number of birds and mammals.

Vines, especially wild grapevines, are known to be extremely damaging to young trees of this species. Vines are damaging both due to blocking out sunlight, and increasing weight on limbs which can lead to bending of the trunk and/or breaking of limbs.

=== Host plant ===
In terms of its role in the ecological community, L. tulipifera does not host a great diversity of insects, with only 28 species of moths associated with the tree. Among specialists, L. tulipifera is the sole host plant for the caterpillars of C. angulifera, a giant silkmoth found in the eastern United States. Several generalist species use L. tulipifera. It is a well-known host for the large, green eggs of the Papilio glaucus, the eastern tiger swallowtail butterfly, which are known to lay their eggs exclusively among plants in the magnolia and rose families of plants, primarily in mid-late June through early August, in some states.

== Notable specimens ==
- The tallest individual at the present time (2021) is one called the Fork Ridge Tulip Tree at a secret location in the Great Smoky Mountains of North Carolina. Repeated measurements by laser and tape-drop have shown it to be 191 feet 10 inches (58.47 m) in height.
- Walt Whitman in 1879 described a tulip tree near Woodstown, NJ whose trunk was 20 feet around with a cavity large enough so that, 25 years prior, 9 men ate dinner inside. Whitman assumed that by that time, in 1879, 12 to 15 men could stand within it.
- The Queens Giant is a tulip tree that is the oldest living thing in the New York Metropolitan area at 350–450 years old (40 m or 130 ft tall).

== Use ==
Liriodendron tulipifera is cultivated, and grows readily from seeds. These should be sown in fine soft soil in a cool and shady area. If sown in autumn they come up the succeeding spring, but if sown in spring they often remain a year in the ground. John Loudon noted that seeds from the highest branches of old trees are most likely to germinate. It is readily propagated from cuttings and easily transplanted.

=== In landscape ===
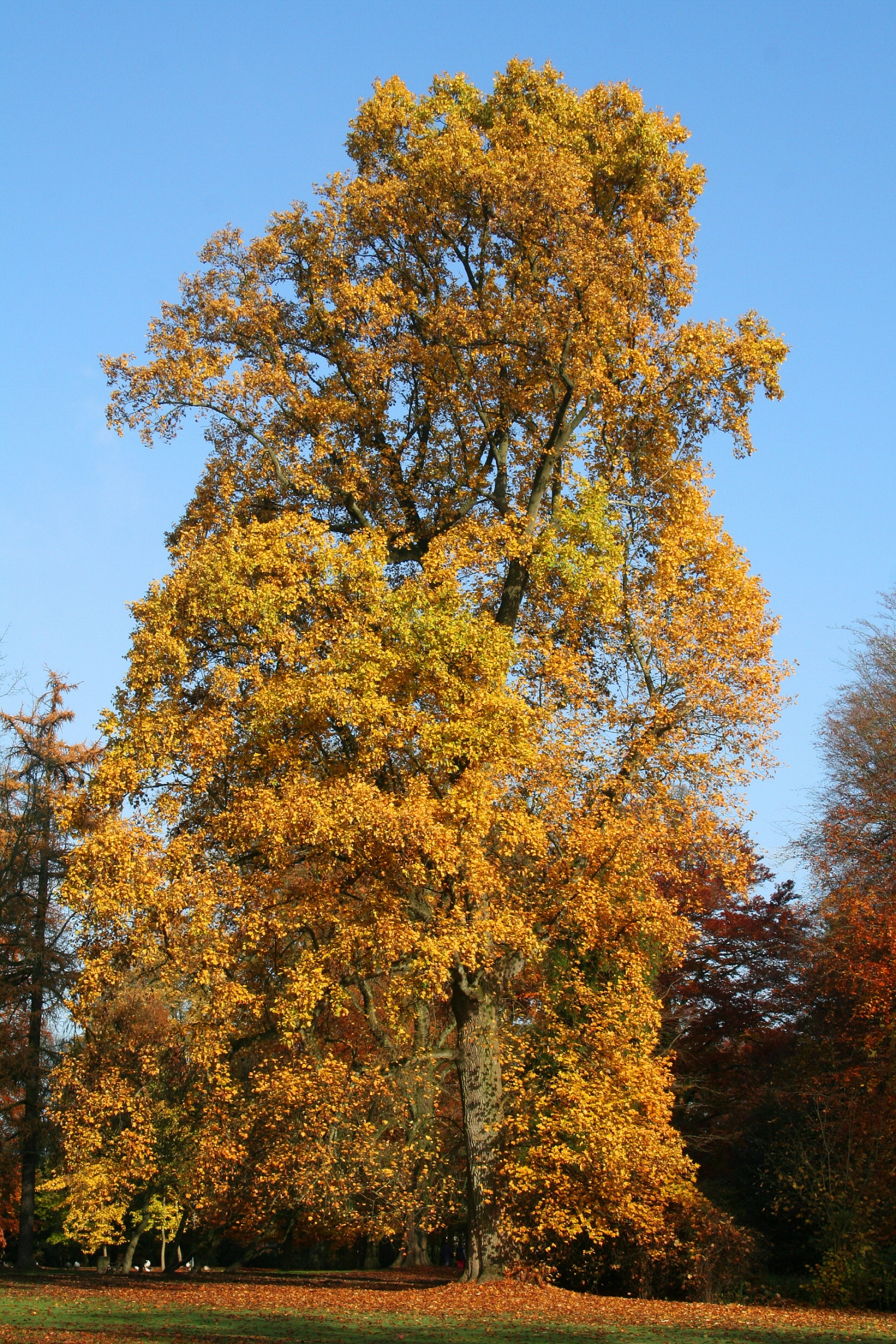
The tulip tree is a popular specimen tree in landscape, turning a rusty orange in Fall

Tulip trees make magnificently shaped specimen trees, and are very large, growing to about 35 m (110 ft) in good soil. They grow best in deep well-drained loam which has thick dark topsoil. They show stronger response to fertilizer compounds (those with low salt index are preferred) than most other trees, but soil structure and organic matter content are more important. In the wild it is occasionally seen around serpentine outcrops. The southeastern coastal plain and east central Florida ecotypes occur in wet but not stagnant soils which are high in organic matter. All tulip trees are unreliable in clay flats which are subject to ponding and flooding.

Like other members of the Magnoliaceae family, they have fleshy roots that are easily broken if handled roughly. Transplanting should be done in early spring, before leaf-out; this timing is especially important in the more northern areas. Fall planting is often successful in Florida. The east central Florida ecotype may be more easily moved than other strains because its roots grow over nine or ten months every year—several months longer than other ecotypes. Most tulip trees have low tolerance of drought, although Florida natives (especially the east central ecotype) fare better than southeastern coastal plain or northern inland specimens.

It is recommended as a shade tree. The tree's tall and rapid growth is a function of its shade intolerance. Grown in the full sun, the species tends to grow shorter, slower, and rounder, making it adaptable to landscape planting. In forest settings, most investment is made in the trunk (i.e., the branches are weak and easily break off, a sign of axial dominance) and lower branches are lost early as new, higher branches closer to the sun continue the growth spurt upward. A tree just 15 years old may already reach 12 m (40 ft) in height with no branches within reach of humans standing on the ground.

Starting in 1785, George Washington planted Tulip Poplar along the Bowling Green area of his Mount Vernon estate. The trees exist today.

==== Cultivars ====
- 'Ardis' – dwarf, with smaller leaves than wild form. Leaves shallow-lobed, some without lower lobes.
- 'Arnold' – narrow, columnar crown; may flower at early age.
- 'Aureomarginatum' – variegated form with pale-edged leaves; sold as 'Flashlight' or 'Majestic Beauty'.
- 'Fastigatum' – similar form to 'Arnold' but flowers at later age.
- 'Florida Strain' – blunt-lobed leaves, fast grower, flowers at early age.
- 'Integrifolium' – leaves without lower lobes.
- 'JFS-Oz' – compact oval form with straight leader, leaves dark and glossy; sold as 'Emerald City.'
- 'Leucanthum' – flowers white or nearly white.
- 'Little Volunteer' – almost as diminutive as 'Ardis' but with stronger form. Leaves more deeply lobed than 'Ardis.'
- 'Mediopictum' – variegated form with yellow spot near center of leaf.
- 'Roothaan' – blunt-lobed leaves.
- 'Snow Bird' - variegated, with white-edged leaves.

In the United Kingdom the species and its variegated cultivar 'Aureomarginatum' have both gained the Royal Horticultural Society's Award of Garden Merit.

Liriodendron tulipifera has been introduced to many temperate parts of the world, at least as far north as Sykkylven, Norway and Arboretum Mustila, Finland. A few nurseries in Finland offer this species even though it is not fully hardy there and tends to be held to shrub form.

It is occasionally cultivated in tropical highlands, as in Hawaii, Costa Rica and Colombia. In the latter nation it is a street tree at Bogotá.

=== Honey ===
Nectar is produced in the orange part of the flowers. The species is a significant honey plant in the eastern United States, yielding a dark reddish, fairly strong honey unsuitable for table honey but claimed to be favorably regarded by some bakers One 20-year-old tree produces enough nectar for 4 pounds (1.8 kg) of honey.

=== Wood ===
Though botanically not a poplar, the soft, fine-grained wood of tulip trees is known by the name 'yellow poplar' in the U.S., but marketed abroad as 'American tulipwood' or other names. It is very widely used where a cheap, easy-to-work and stable wood is needed. The sapwood is usually a creamy off-white color. While the heartwood is usually a pale green, it can take on streaks of red, purple, or even black; depending on the extractives content (i.e. the soil conditions where the tree was grown, etc.). It is a wood of choice for use in organs, due to its ability to take a fine, smooth, precisely cut finish and so to effectively seal against pipes and valves. It is also commonly used for siding clapboards. Its wood may be compared in texture, strength, and softness to white pine.

Used for interior finish of houses, for siding, for panels of carriages, for coffin boxes, pattern timber, and wooden ware. During scarcity of the better qualities of white pine, tulip wood has taken its place to some extent, particularly when very wide boards are required.

It also has a reputation for being resistant to termites, and in the Upland South (and perhaps elsewhere) house and barn sills were often made of tulip wood beams.

Tulip poplar wood is one of the favorites for wood carvers Wilhelm Schimmel and Shields Landon Jones.

=== In science ===
Tulip tree leaf litter has been the substrate of choice for a number of microbial ecology studies, particularly those investigating an aquatic priming effect. The leaves have a relatively low lignin content, making them labile and quick to decompose. These traits allow researchers to easily observe microbial activity and changes in decay rate over shorter period of time.

== In popular culture ==
- In the 1819 short story, "The Legend of Sleepy Hollow," Washington Irving describes the historical tulip tree that marked the site where British Spy, John André, was captured by Revolutionary forces. Protagonist Ichabod Crane is spooked by the tree, which stood in the center of the road and "towered like a giant above all the other trees...its limbs were vast, gnarled, and fantastic, twisting down almost to the earth, and rising again into the air, and they would have formed trunks for ordinary trees.... It was universally known by the name of Major André's tree." The tree eventually succumbed to lightning strike, but a monument now stands at the site commemorating André's capture.
- The tulip tree is a plot element in Edgar Allan Poe's short story "The Gold-Bug" (1843).
- Walt Whitman observed in 1876-77 a 70-foot-tall tulip tree and how "from top to bottom, seeking the sweet juice in the blossoms, it swarms with myriads of these wild bees, whose loud and steady humming makes an undertone to the whole." He referred to the tulip tree as "the Apollo of the woods — tall and graceful, yet robust and sinewy, inimitable in hang of foliage and throwing-out of limb ; as if the beauteous, vital, leafy creature could walk, if it only would."
- The tulip tree has been referenced in many poems and the namesakes of other poems, such as William Stafford's "Tulip Tree" (1964).
