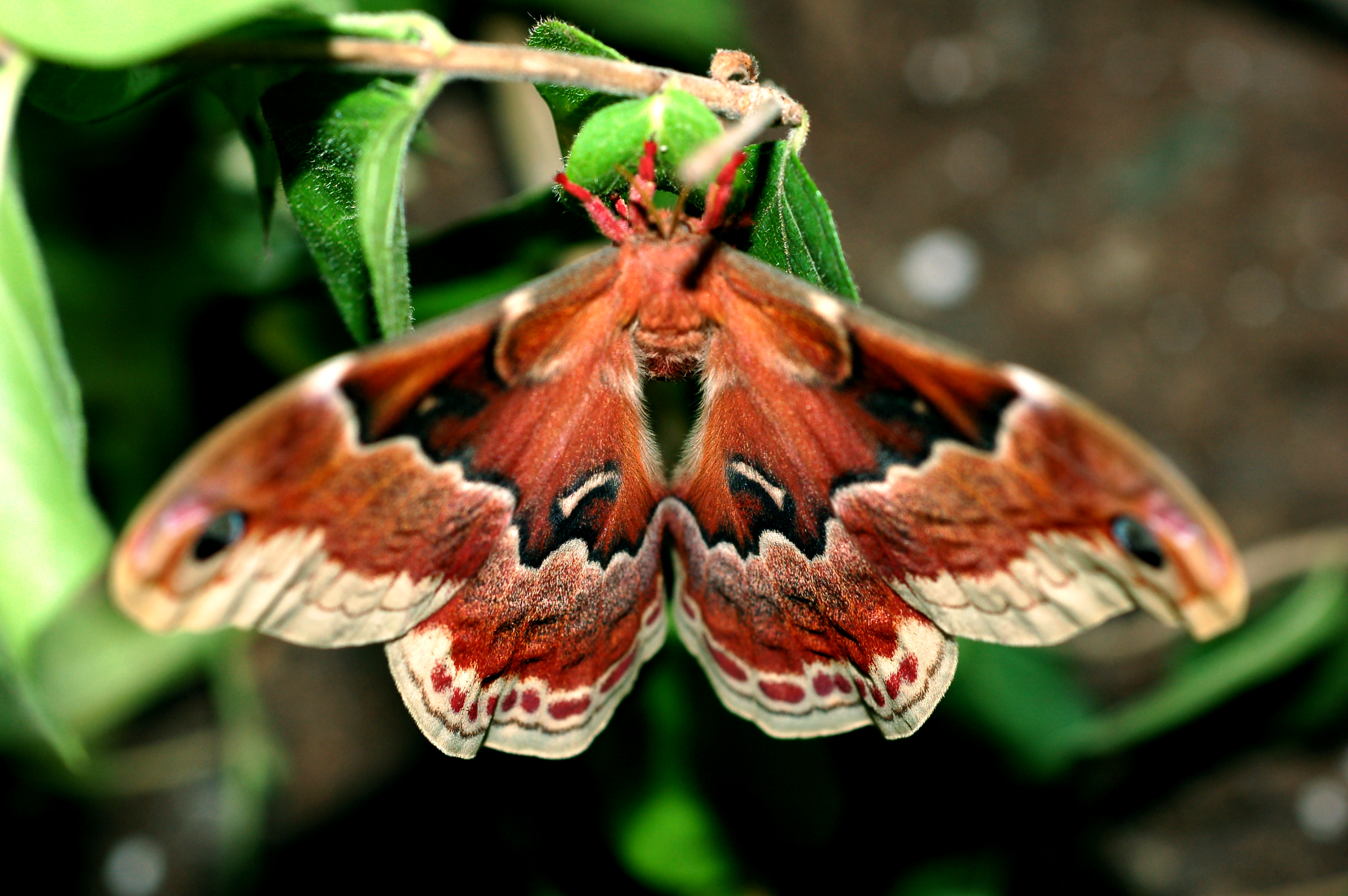
- Callosamia promethea

Scientific classification
- Kingdom: Animalia
- Phylum: Arthropoda
- Clade: Pancrustacea
- Class: Insecta
- Order: Lepidoptera
- Family: Saturniidae
- Tribe: Attacini
- Genus: Callosamia; Packard, 1864

= Callosamia =

Genus of moths

Callosamia is a genus of moths in the family Saturniidae first described by Alpheus Spring Packard in 1864.

== Species ==
- Callosamia angulifera (Walker, 1855)
- Callosamia promethea (Drury, 1773)
- Callosamia securifera (Maassen, 1873)
