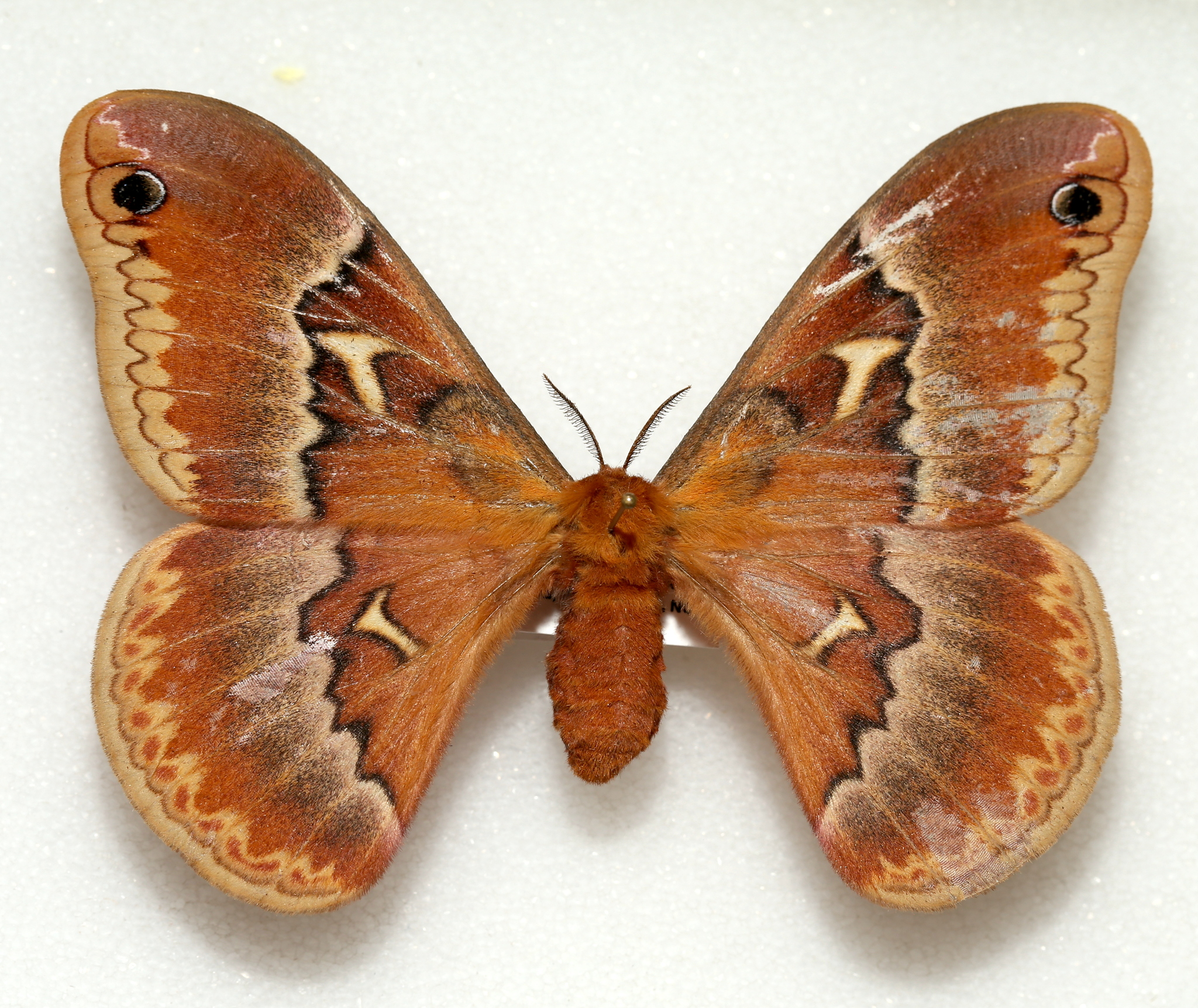
- Adult
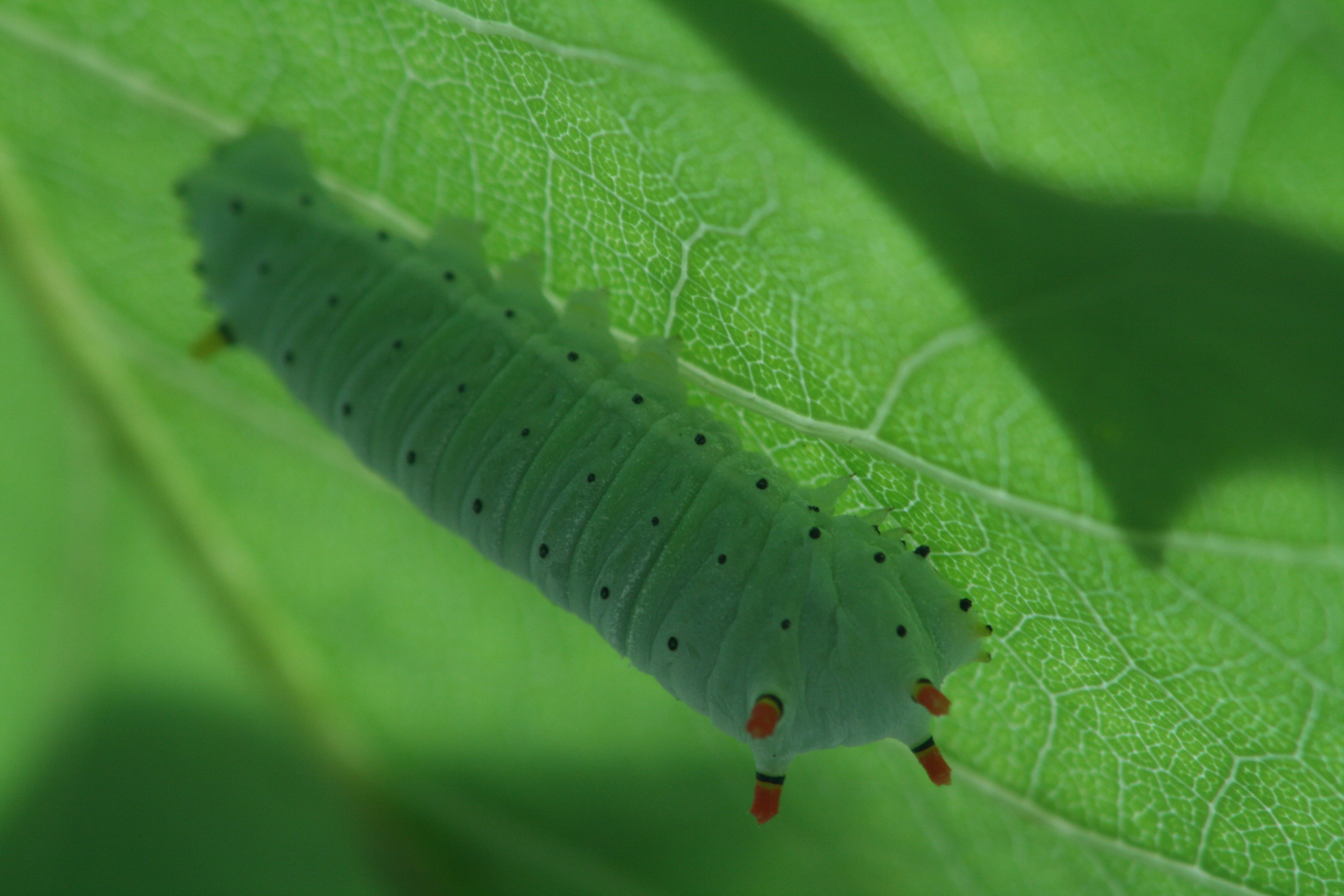
- Caterpillar

Scientific classification
- Kingdom: Animalia
- Phylum: Arthropoda
- Clade: Pancrustacea
- Class: Insecta
- Order: Lepidoptera
- Family: Saturniidae
- Genus: Callosamia
- Species: C. angulifera

Binomial name
- Callosamia angulifera (Walker, 1855)

Synonyms
- Samia angulifera Walker, 1855; Callosamia aurantiaca Igel, 1928

= Callosamia angulifera =

Species of moth

Callosamia angulifera, the tuliptree silkmoth or giant silkmoth, is a moth of the family Saturniidae. It is found in North America from Massachusetts east through central New York, southern Ontario, and southern Michigan to central Illinois, south to the Florida panhandle and Mississippi.

The wingspan is 8–11 cm (3.1–4.3 in). In the north there is one generation per year, with adults on wing from June to August, while in the south there are two generations per year, with adults on wing from March to April and again in August.

The larvae feed on Liriodendron tulipifera. Adults do not feed.
