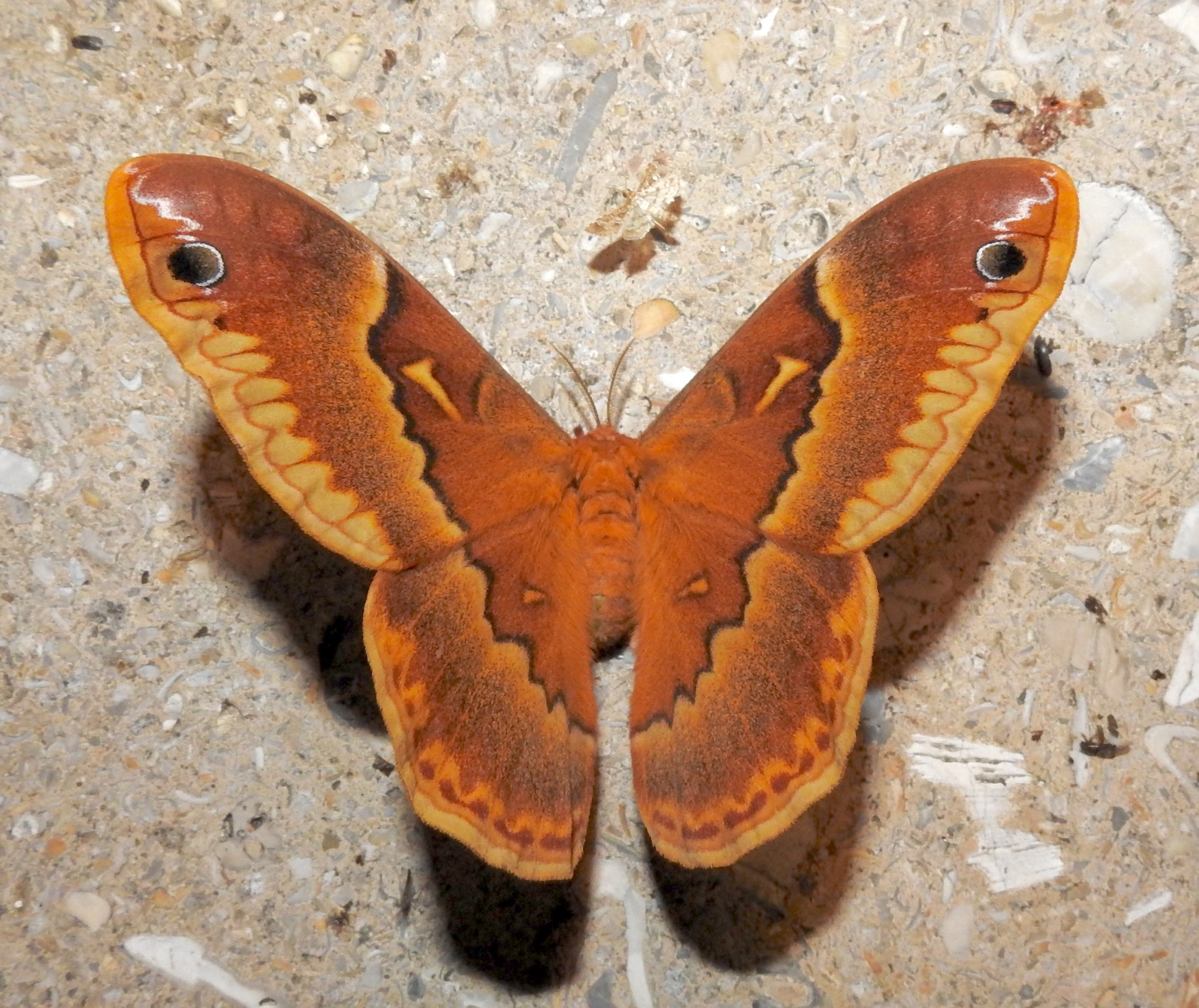

Scientific classification
- Domain: Eukaryota
- Kingdom: Animalia
- Phylum: Arthropoda
- Class: Insecta
- Order: Lepidoptera
- Family: Saturniidae
- Genus: Callosamia
- Species: C. securifera

Binomial name
- Callosamia securifera (Maassen, 1873)

Synonyms
- Samia securifera Maassen, 1873; Callosamia angulifera var. carolina F. M. Jones, 1908

= Sweetbay silkmoth =

Species of moth

The sweetbay silkmoth (Callosamia securifera) is a saturniid in the genus Callosamia. It was named after the host tree, Magnolia virginiana (sweetbay magnolia). The species was first described by Peter Maassen in 1873.

Males have dark maroonish wings, while the females have brownish-pinkish wings. The southern phases are more orange yellow colored, brighter, and more pale. All phases have a "7" mark on their wings with the eyespots, lavender patches, and buff-patterned borders.

These moths are diurnal and their mating period is in the afternoon. Their lifespan is about two weeks, long enough to mate and lay eggs. Like other moths in the genus Callosamia, the caterpillar spins a hanging cocoon that has leaves attached to it.
