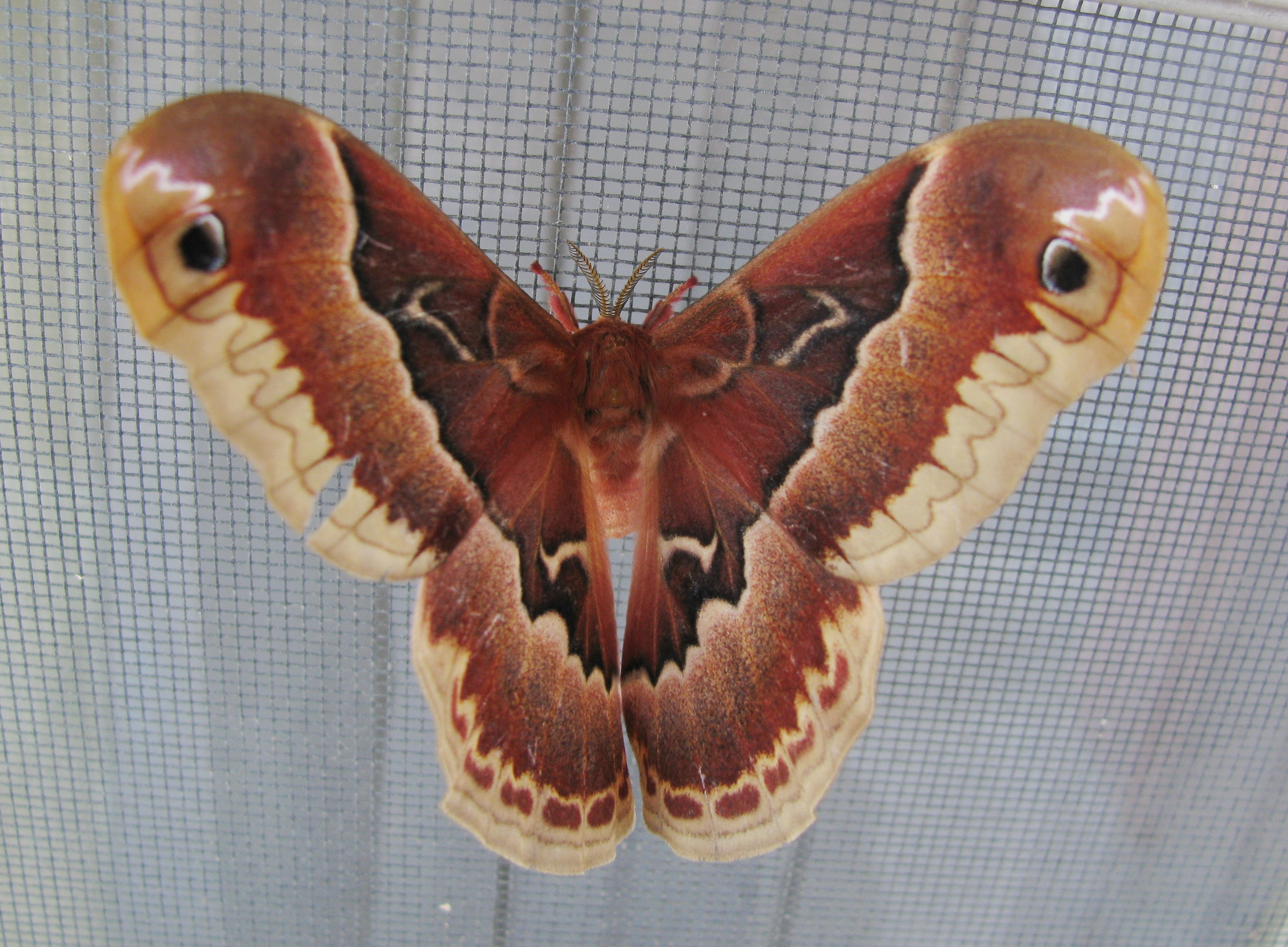
- Female
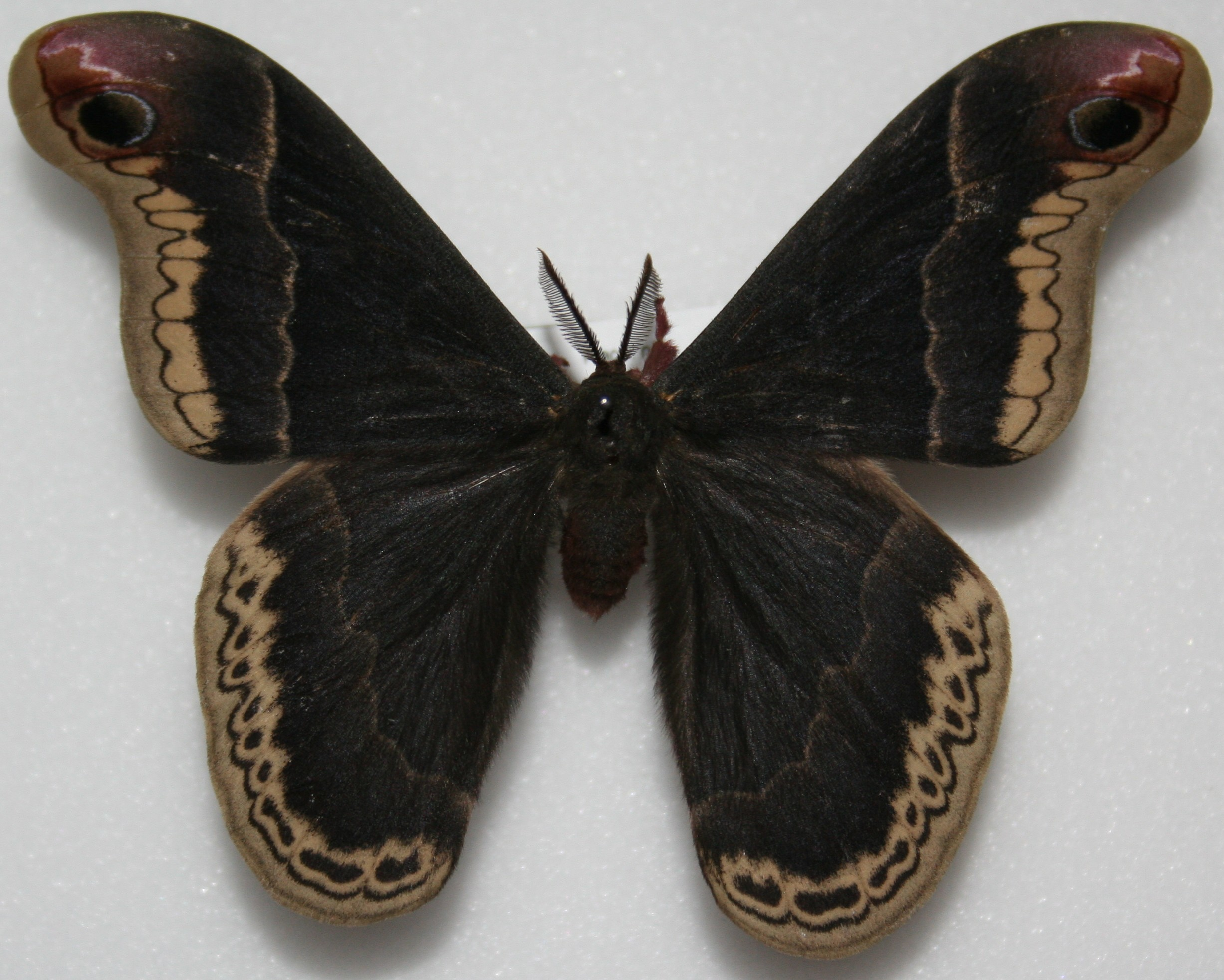
- Male

Conservation status
- Secure (NatureServe)

Scientific classification
- Kingdom: Animalia
- Phylum: Arthropoda
- Clade: Pancrustacea
- Class: Insecta
- Order: Lepidoptera
- Family: Saturniidae
- Genus: Callosamia
- Species: C. promethea

Binomial name
- Callosamia promethea (Drury, 1773)

= Callosamia promethea =

Promethea silkmoth

Species of moth

Callosamia promethea, commonly known as the promethea silkmoth, is a member of the family Saturniidae, which contains approximately 2,300 species. It is also known as the spicebush silkmoth, which refers to one of the promethea silkmoth's common host plants, spicebush (Lindera benzoin). C. promethea is classified as a silk moth, which stems from its ability to produce silk, which it does in the formation of its cocoon. C. promethea lives in forests in the eastern U.S. and does not damage the trees on which it lives. The species was first described by Dru Drury in 1773.

Callosamia promethea hatches from its eggs and feeds on its host plants before pupating while hanging from trees during the winter. It then emerges and mates during a specific time of day. The females utilize pheromones to attract males for mating, with both sexes mating multiple times. They are the only moth in their family where the sexes are not active at the same time of day, with males being diurnal and females being nocturnal. They only overlap in activity for a few hours in the early evening. The males use mimicry of the poisonous pipevine swallowtail butterfly as a form of protection from predators.

== Distribution and habitat ==
The range of C. promethea extends the length of the east coast of the United States and west to the Great Plains. C. promethea is found in deciduous forests.

== Food resources ==
=== Caterpillar ===
Callosamia promethea utilizes multiple plant families as their hosts, including Rosaceae, Oleaceae and Lauraceae. There is no negative effect to C. promethea larvae being raised on a host plant different from the one that their parents were raised on, for the specific host plants tested in the study. The nutritional content of the individual host plant matters more to the health of the larvae than feeding on a population's typical host plant. Some examples of common host plants are the tulip tree (Liriodendron tulipifera), sassafras (Sassafrass albidum) and spicebush (Lindera benzoin).

=== Adult ===
Callosamia promethea does not consume any food in its adult stage.

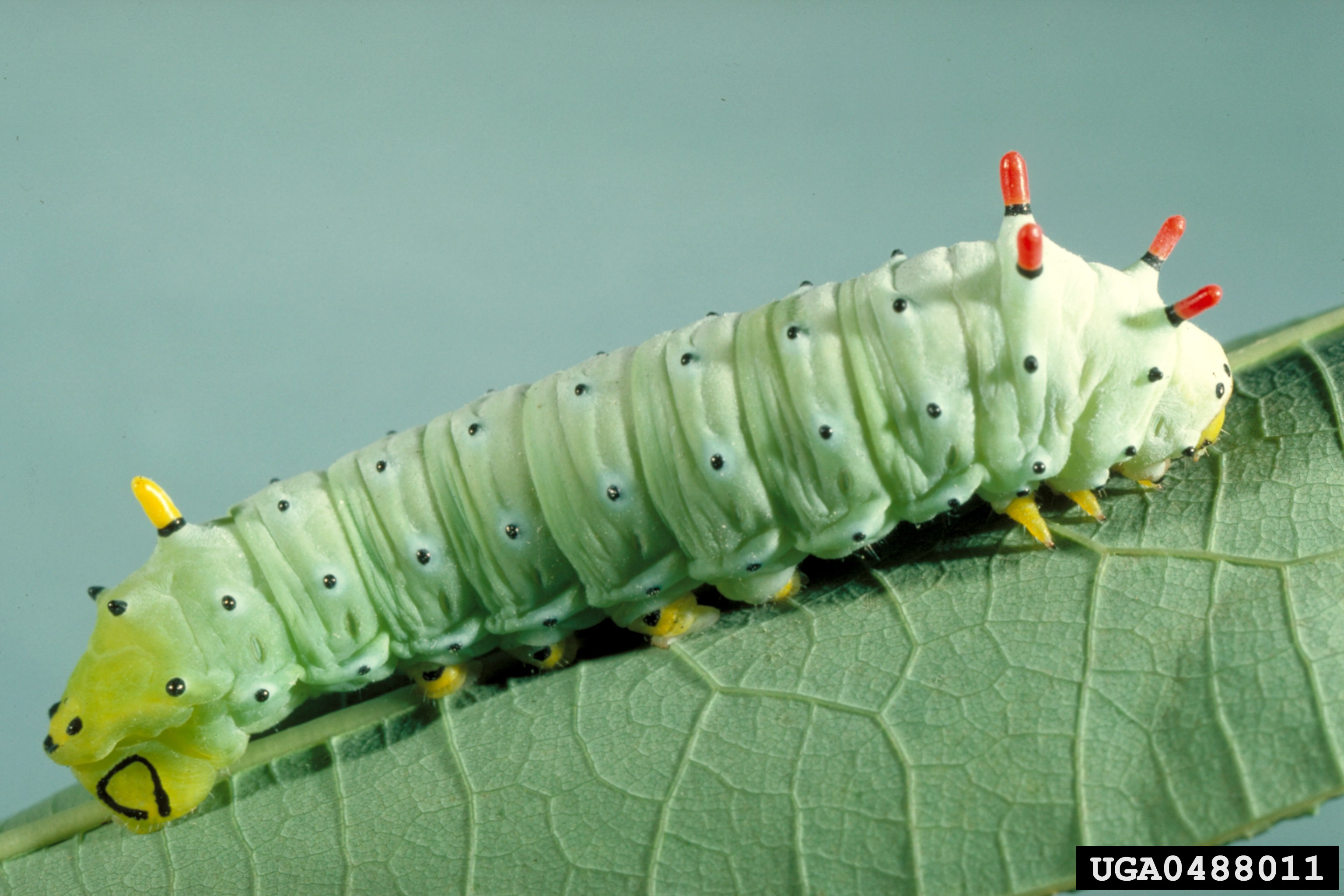
Callosamia promethea larva

== Life cycle ==
=== Egg ===
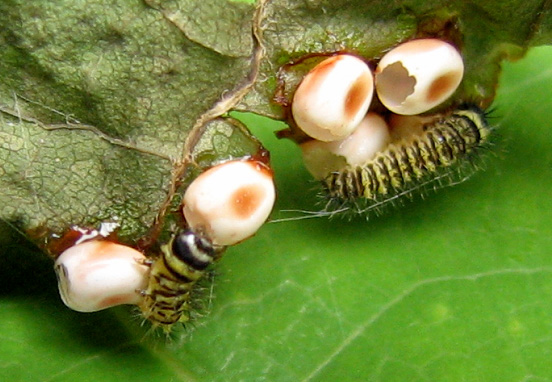
Eggs and first-instar larvae

Female promethea silkmoths lay their eggs on the leaves of the host plants of the caterpillars. The eggs are laid at night. A female's eggs are laid in groups of 4 to 10 at a time. Eggs are white, flat and elliptical.

=== Caterpillar ===
Once the caterpillars hatch, they are fairly solitary. They eat leaves from the edge inwards. The caterpillars eat from several host plants. Caterpillars begin as yellow with black stripes, but become blue green over time. Once they are blue green, they develop four red and one yellow protuberances. These caterpillars go through several instars or skin shedding, and usually after the fifth shedding the caterpillar is ready to form a cocoon. When the caterpillars form cocoons, they are twice as long as they are wide.

=== Pupa ===
Some caterpillars in the family Saturniidae will pupate in the ground. However, promethea silkmoth caterpillars pupate in trees. The caterpillars attach themselves directly to the branches of trees with their silk. Then, they curl a dead leaf around themselves. C. promethea pupates during the winter.

=== Adult ===
The wingspan of this moth is 3 to 4 inches (76 to 102 mm). Like most Lepidoptera, females are on average larger than males. Males are darkly pigmented, while females are more brightly colored. The males and females both have tan on the edges of their wings. The males have a set of eyespots on their forewings, but the females have spots on all their wings. In the northern part of the promethea silkmoth's range, there is one brood per year and it occurs during the early summer. In the southern part of the moth's range, there are two broods, with one occurring in the spring and the other occurring in late summer.

== Predators ==
The location of the C. promethea cocoon typically provides the pupae with sufficient protection from possible predators. The cocoons hang from thin branches and are difficult to open, so mice may have difficulty predating because the branches are too thin to hold their weight and woodpeckers could have trouble opening the pupa. Other predators of the cocoons include some flies and wasps.

== Protective coloration and behavior ==
=== Mimicry ===
Callosamia promethea utilizes Batesian mimicry, in which an edible species mimics a toxic species as a form of protection from predators. Promethea silkmoth females are rust and cream colored, but the males have very different coloration. Promethea silkmoth males mimic the pipe vine swallowtail (Battus philenor), a poisonous butterfly. The topside of the wings of promethea silkmoth males is black, as are the wings of the pipe vine swallowtails, which also have a shiny blue pattern on the top surface of their wings. The promethea silkmoth males do not have this reflective blue pattern, but their mimicry is still effective due to the fact that the blue reflective pattern is only visible on pipe vine swallowtails in a certain light, so the blue is not essential for C. promethea's mimicry to be effective.

The effectiveness of this mimicry was tested experimentally. Promethea silkmoth males were painted with various patterns, then released, and the amount of each group that was recaptured showed that mimicry helped the moths survive. The control group was painted black, to match their actual coloration. One experimental group was painted black and yellow to mimic the tiger swallowtail (Papilio glaucus), which is not a poisonous butterfly and does not mimic the poisonous pipe vine swallowtail. The other experimental group was painted with orange stripes to mimic the poisonous monarch butterfly. The two groups that were painted to be mimetic to a poisonous butterfly both were recaptured more than the group painted to match an edible butterfly. This shows that mimicry, specifically the partial mimic of promethea silkmoth males to pipe vine swallowtails, is adequate protection against predation.

== Mating ==
=== Female/male interactions ===
==== Pheromones ====
Female promethea silkmoths release pheromones to attract males. The females remain in place, camouflaged, as they wait for the males to sense their pheromones and come to them. Females release their pheromones at a specific time of day called the "calling time". For C. promethea this time is late afternoon and into the early evening. When males sense the pheromones of a female they travel up the gradient of the pheromones and towards the female. Males are able locate females from miles away. One C. promethea male has been found to be able to detect and find a female from 23 miles away. A distance this long is likely to be covered in multiple days.

==== Mate choice ====
In terms of locating mates, males cannot find females unless they release pheromones, so the females control how frequently they mate. When females do send out their pheromones, the first male to reach a female will mate with her.

==== Number of mates ====
Callosamia promethea are polyandrous, meaning the females mate with multiple males. However, not all females practice this behavior, some only mating with a single male. They are the only moth in the family Saturniidae known to be polyandrous. This is likely because C. promethea is the only moth that is both diurnal (males) and nocturnal (females). This allows for egg laying and mating to occur at different times of day, so there is no trade off between the two activities. Male moths are polygamous, as well. Polyandrous females are more fecund, due to laying more eggs. A female's eggs are mostly mature when they are laid.

== Conservation ==
Callosamia promethea is not endangered and there are no specific management practices in place to maintain or control the species.

== Pest status ==
While these moths do live on many species of trees as a caterpillar they are not reported to cause any noticeable damage to their host trees.

== Gallery ==
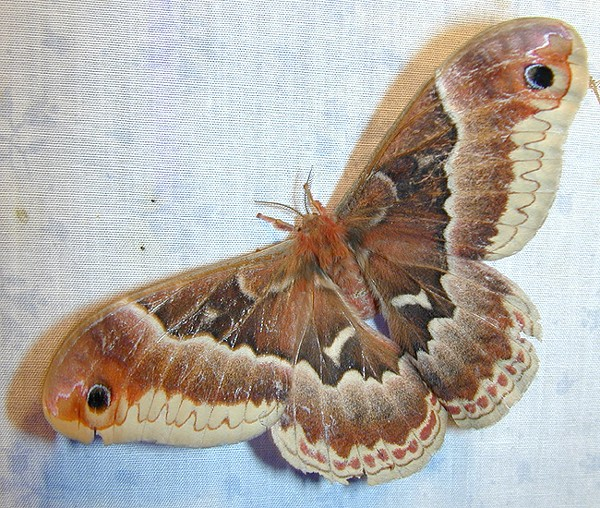
Adult

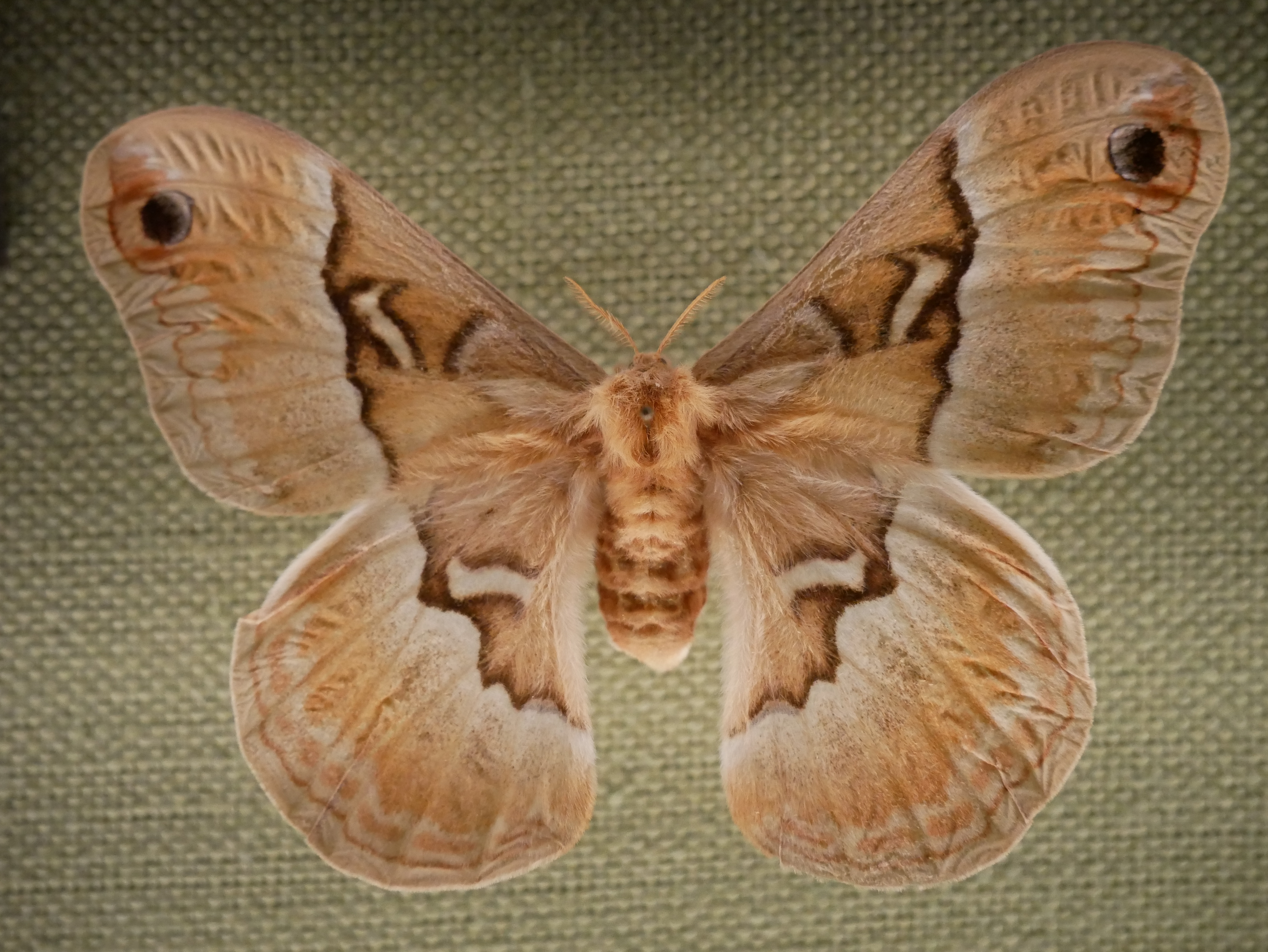
Adult female

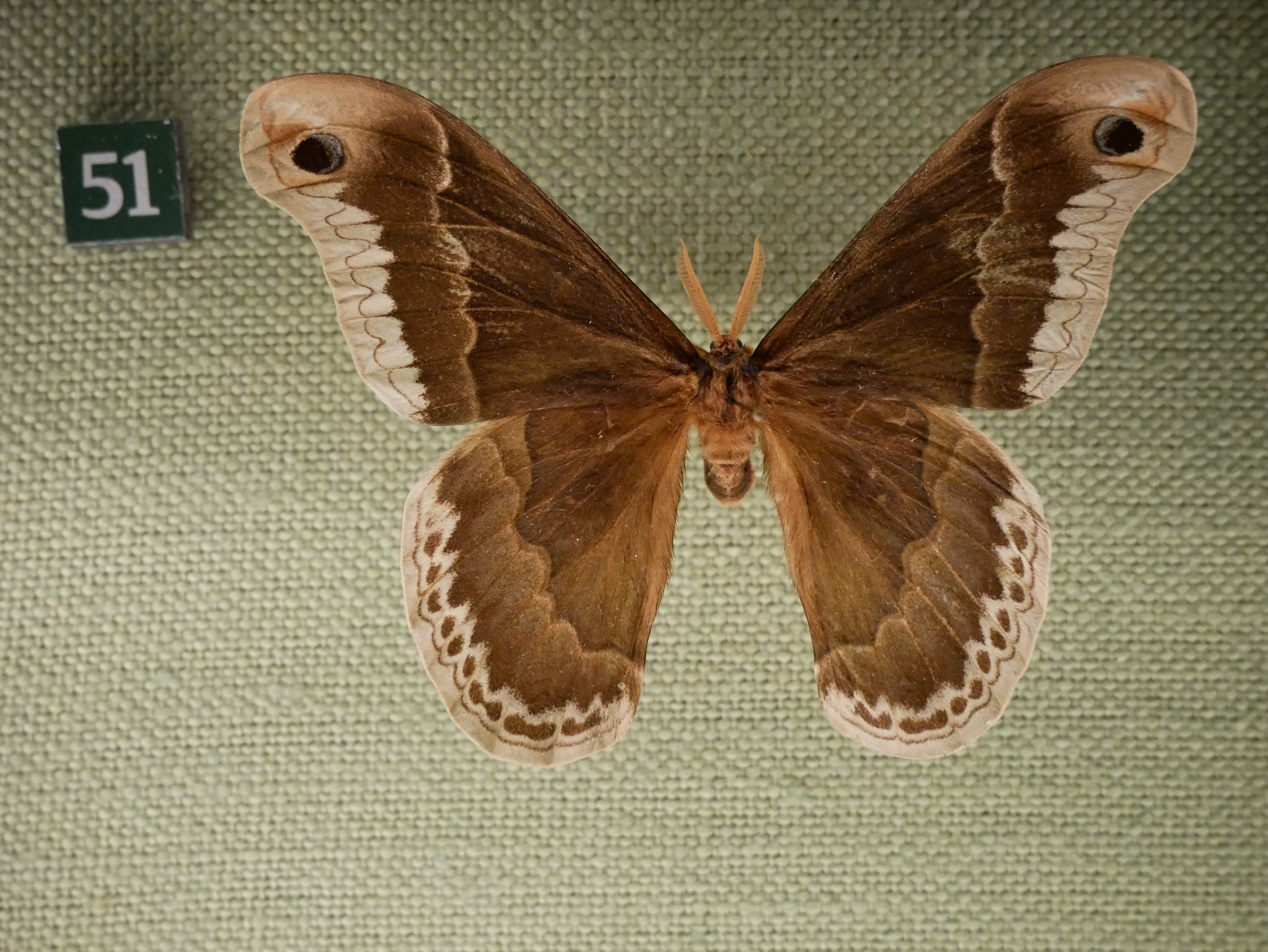
Adult male
