= Shields Landon Jones =

American folk artist (1901–1997)

Shields Landon Jones (1901 – 1997) was an American folk artist. He was known for his hand-carved, painted wood sculptures.
