= Spring Hammock Preserve =

Coordinates: 28.72°N 81.30°W

Spring Hammock Preserve is a 1,500-acre (610 ha) natural area in Seminole County, Florida. Its mucky areas protect examples of hydric hammock and floodplain forest. Sandy terrain supports upland hardwood and pine flatwood ecosystems. Many animal and plant species in the preserve are either rare or near their range limit..

Part of the natural area is old-growth forest and recognized by the Old-Growth Forest Network.
