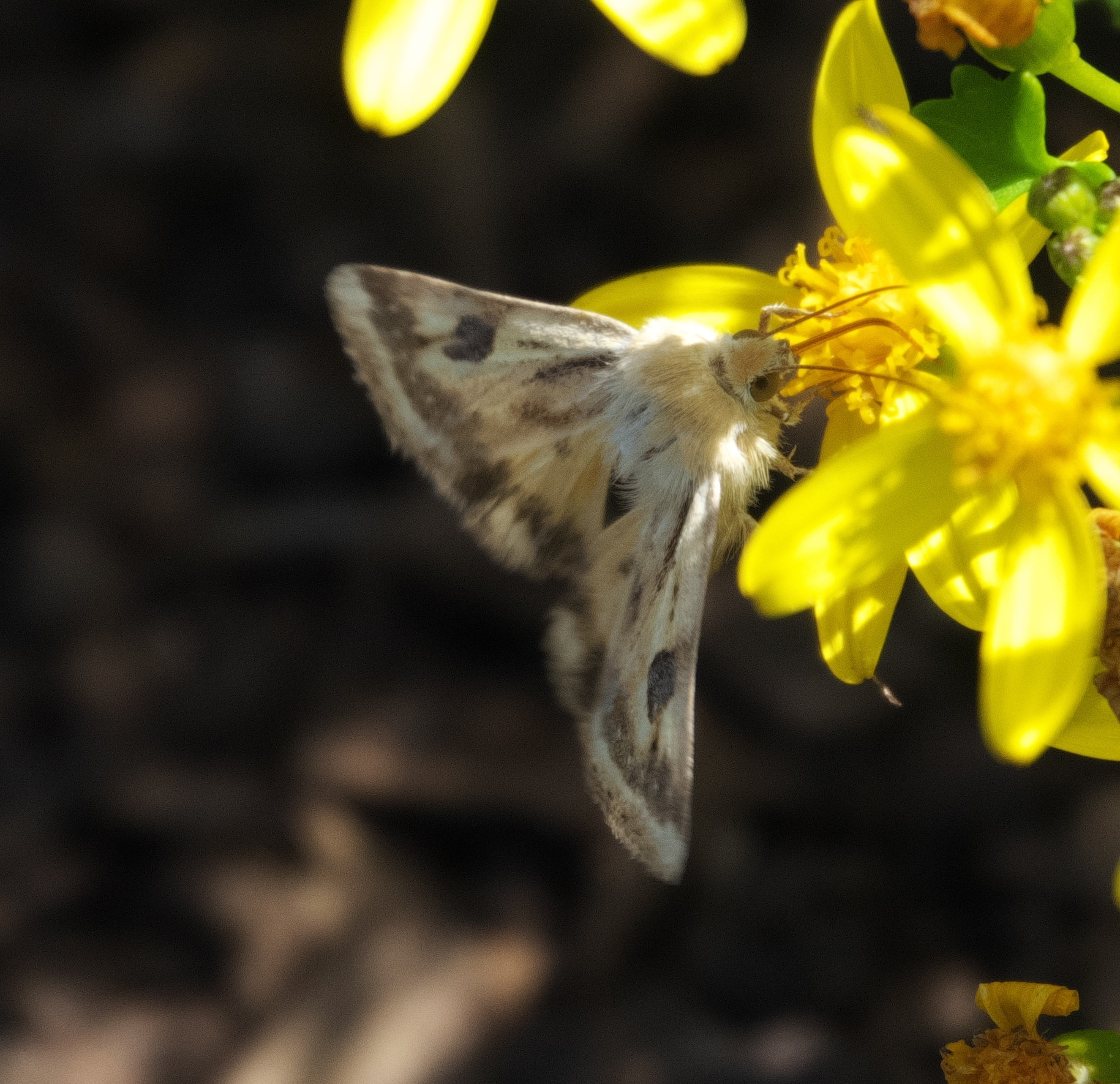
- Heliothis scutuligera, South Africa

Scientific classification
- Kingdom: Animalia
- Phylum: Arthropoda
- Class: Insecta
- Order: Lepidoptera
- Superfamily: Noctuoidea
- Family: Noctuidae
- Subfamily: Heliothinae
- Genus: Heliothis
- Species: H. scutuligera

Binomial name
- Heliothis scutuligera Guenée, 1852

Synonyms
- Heliothis errans Walker, 1865

= Heliothis scutuligera =

Species of moth

Heliothis scutuligera is a species of moth of the family Noctuidae first described by Achille Guenée in 1852. It is found in the Western, Eastern and Northern Cape of South Africa, Lesotho KwaZulu-Natal, Transvaal, Botswana, Zimbabwe and Malawi.
