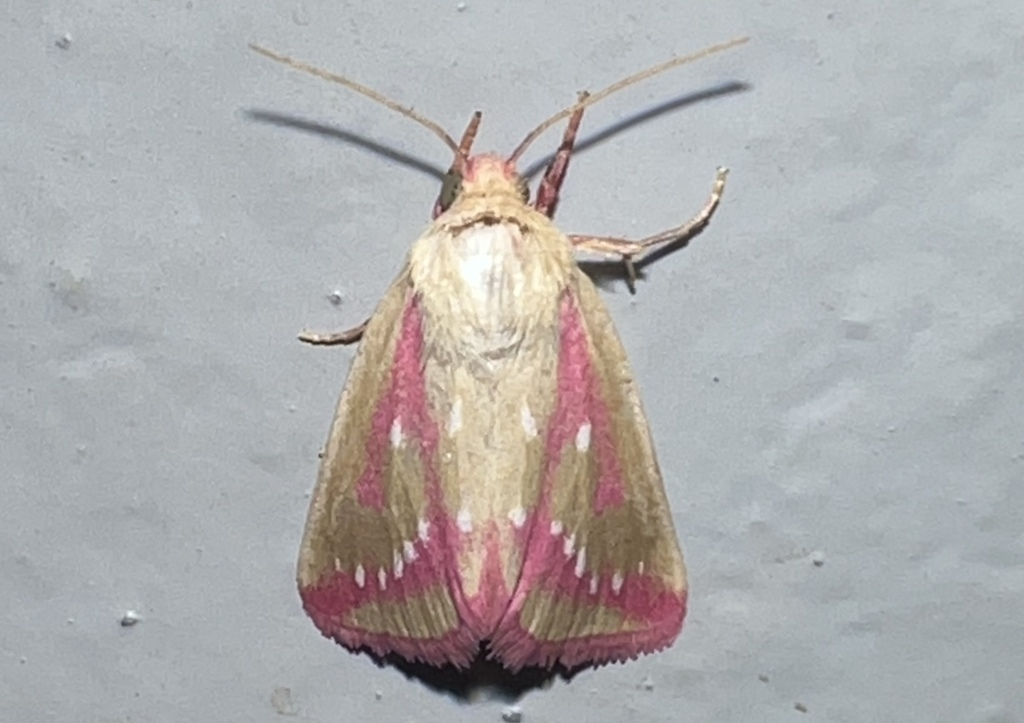

Scientific classification
- Kingdom: Animalia
- Phylum: Arthropoda
- Clade: Pancrustacea
- Class: Insecta
- Order: Lepidoptera
- Superfamily: Noctuoidea
- Family: Noctuidae
- Genus: Timora
- Species: T. albiseriata

Binomial name
- Timora albiseriata Druce, 1903

= Timora albiseriata =

Species of moth in Africa

Timora albiseriata is a moth in the family Noctuidae.

== Description ==
This species was described by Herbert Druce in 1903.

== Range ==
It is found in Gambia, Ghana, Kenya, Mauritania, Niger, Nigeria, Saudi Arabia, Senegal, and Sudan.
