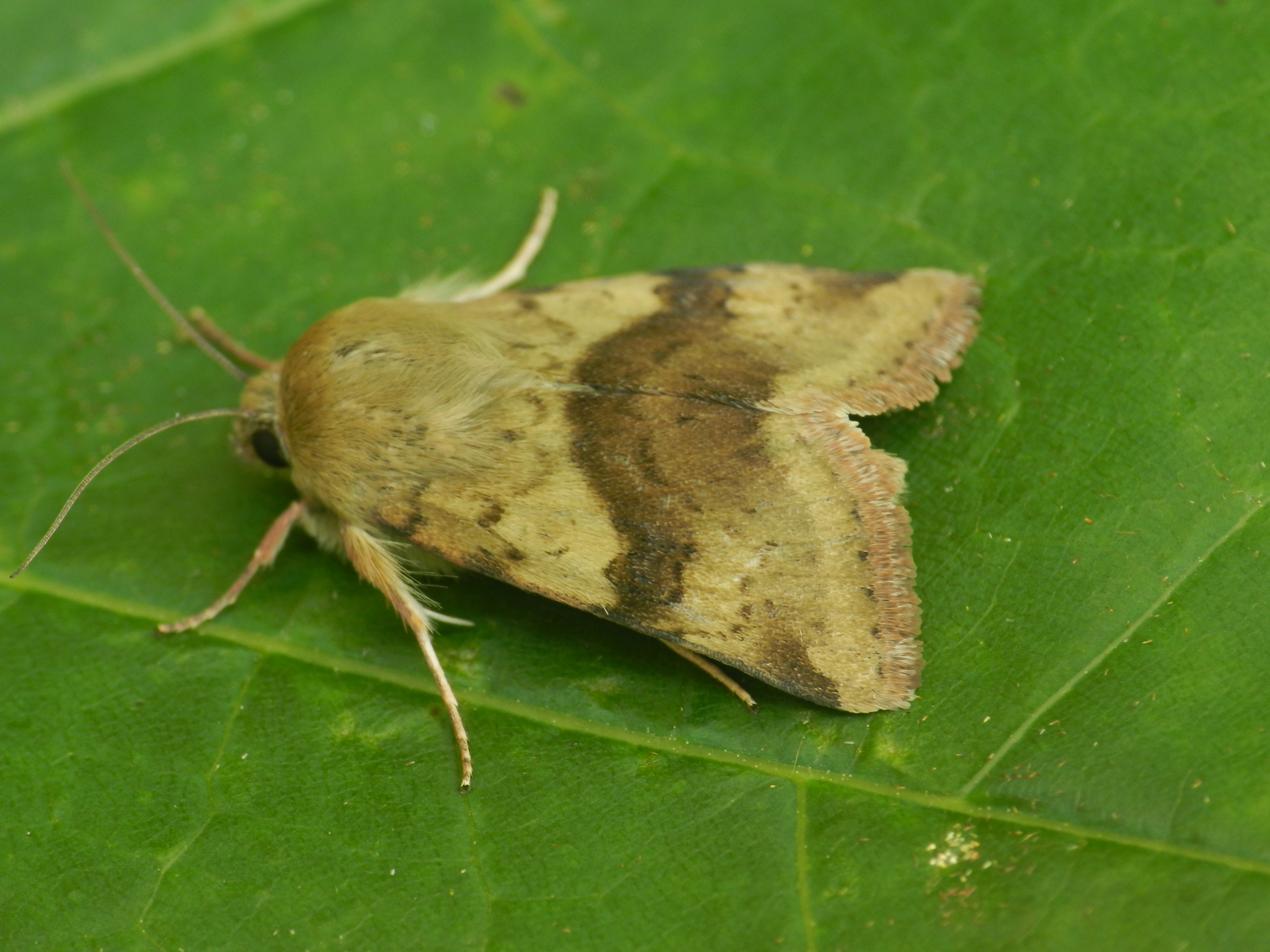
- Heliothis viriplaca, Poland

Scientific classification
- Kingdom: Animalia
- Phylum: Arthropoda
- Class: Insecta
- Order: Lepidoptera
- Superfamily: Noctuoidea
- Family: Noctuidae
- Subfamily: Heliothinae
- Genus: Heliothis; Ochsenheimer, 1816

Subgenera
- ?Timora Walker, 1856; Masalia Moore, 1881

Synonyms
- Heliothentes Ochsenheimer, 1816; Heliotis Sodoffsky, 1837; Aspila Guenée, 1852; Disocnemis Grote, 1883; Dysocnemis Grote, 1890; Neocleptria Hampson, 1903; Pradatta Moore, 1881; Curubasa Moore, 1881; Lecerfia Domont, 1920

= Heliothis =

Genus of moths

Heliothis is a genus of moths in the family Noctuidae. It was first described by Ferdinand Ochsenheimer in 1816. Some of the species have larvae which are agricultural pests on crop species such as tobacco, cotton, soybean and pigeon pea. Some species originally in this genus have been moved to other genera, see Chloridea and Helicoverpa.

== Taxonomy ==
Several species of moths of agricultural importance that used to be placed in this genus now are classified as members of the genus Helicoverpa, such as the corn earworm, Helicoverpa zea. The species subflexa, tergemina, and virescens are now members of the genus Chloridea.

== Description ==
The proboscis is fully developed. Palpi porrect (extending forward) and second joint evenly clothed with long hair. The third joint is short and depressed and a short frontal shift. Thorax and abdomen without tufts. Fore tibia has a pair of slender terminal spines, whereas mid and hind tibia also spined. Forewings with veins 8 and 9 sometimes given off from the end of the areole.

== Species ==
- Subgenus Heliothis:
  - Heliothis acesias Felder & Rogenhofer, 1872
  - Heliothis australis Hardwick, 1994
  - Heliothis belladonna (H. Edwards, 1881)
  - Heliothis borealis (Hampson, 1903)
  - Heliothis conifera (Hampson, 1913)
  - Heliothis cystiphora (Wallengren, 1860)
  - Heliothis flavescens (Janse, 1917)
  - Heliothis flavigera (Hampson, 1907)
  - Heliothis fuscimacula (Janse, 1917)
  - Heliothis hoarei Matthews, 1999
  - Heliothis lucilinea Walker, 1858
  - Heliothis maritima Graslin, 1855
  - Heliothis metachrisea (Hampson, 1903)
  - Heliothis melanoleuca Mitchell, 1997
  - Heliothis molochitina (Berg, 1882)
  - Heliothis nubigera Herrich-Schäffer, [1851]
  - Heliothis ononis (Denis & Schiffermüller, 1775)
  - Heliothis oregonica (H. Edwards, 1875)
  - Heliothis pauliani Viette, 1959
  - Heliothis peltigera (Denis & Schiffermüller, 1775)
  - Heliothis perstriata (Brandt, 1941)
  - Heliothis philbyi (Brandt, 1941)
  - Heliothis phloxiphaga Grote & Robinson, 1867
  - Heliothis proruptus Grote, 1873
  - Heliothis punctifera Walker, 1857
  - Heliothis roseivena (Walker, 1866)
  - Heliothis scutuligera Guenée, 1852
  - Heliothis sturmhoefeli Draudt, 1927
  - Heliothis viriplaca (Hufnagel, 1766)
  - Heliothis xanthia Angulo y Olivares, 1999
  - Heliothis xanthiata Walker, 1865
- Subgenus Masalia:
  - Heliothis albida (Hampson, 1905)
  - Heliothis albipuncta (Hampson, 1910)
  - Heliothis cruentata (Moore, 1881)
  - Heliothis decorata (Moore, 1881)
  - Heliothis disticta (Hampson, 1902)
  - Heliothis galatheae (Wallengren, 1856)
  - Heliothis leucosticta (Hampson, 1902)
  - Heliothis nubila (Hampson, 1903)
  - Heliothis philbyi (Brandt, 1941)
  - Heliothis perstriata (Brandt, 1941)
  - Heliothis quilengesi Seymour, 1972
  - Heliothis sublimis (Berio, 1962)
  - Heliothis transvaalica (Distant, 1902)
  - Heliothis uncta (Swinhoe, 1885)
- Subgenus Timora (also treated as a separate genus):
  - See: Timora
