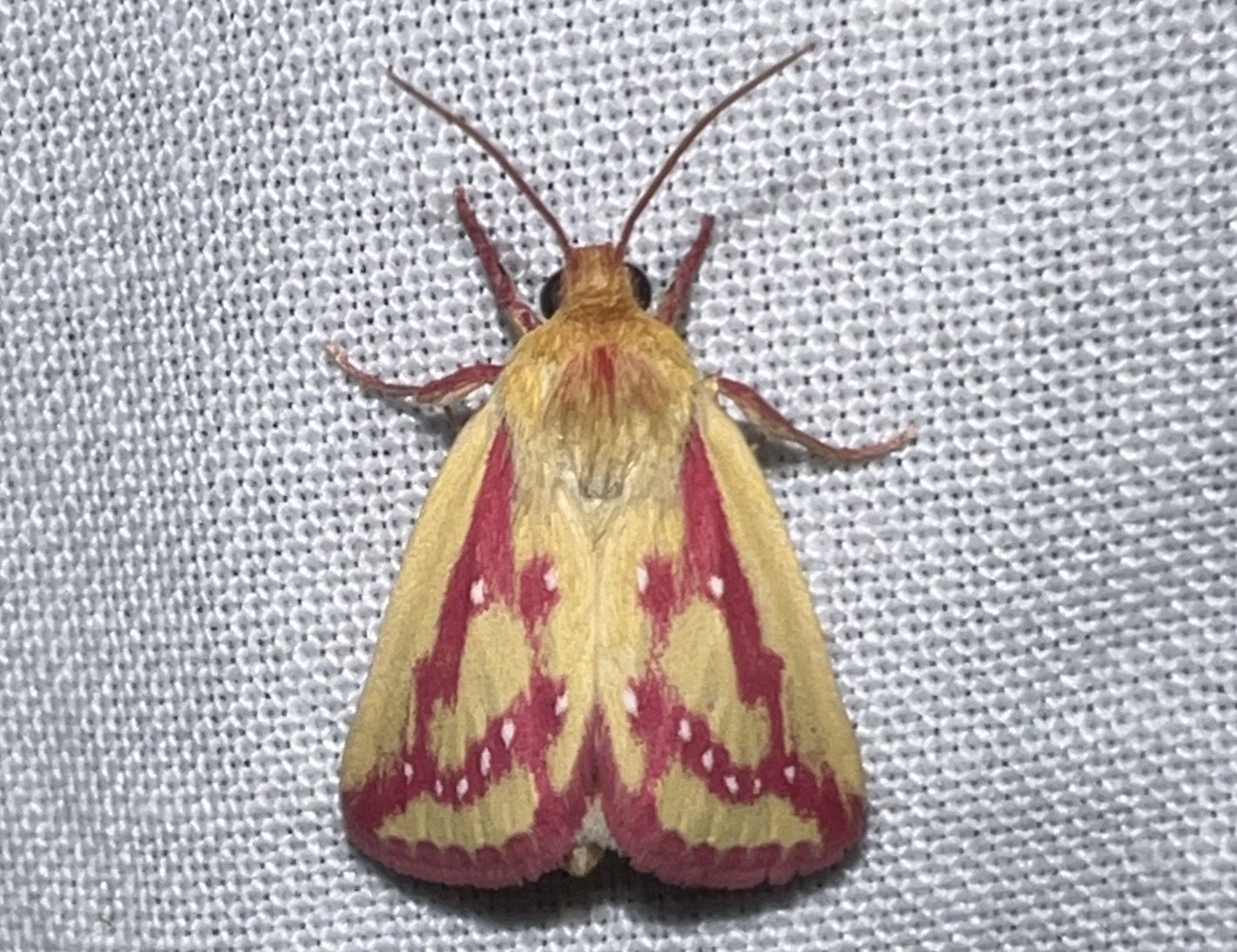

Scientific classification
- Kingdom: Animalia
- Phylum: Arthropoda
- Clade: Pancrustacea
- Class: Insecta
- Order: Lepidoptera
- Superfamily: Noctuoidea
- Family: Noctuidae
- Genus: Timora
- Species: T. metarhoda

Binomial name
- Timora metarhoda Druce, 1903

= Timora metarhoda =

Species of moth in Africa

Timora metarhoda is a moth in the family Noctuidae.

== Description ==
This species was described by Herbert Druce in 1903.

== Range ==
It is found in Gambia.
