= Masalia =

Scientific classification
- Domain: Eukaryota
- Kingdom: Animalia
- Phylum: Arthropoda
- Class: Insecta
- Order: Lepidoptera
- Superfamily: Noctuoidea
- Family: Noctuidae
- Genus: Heliothis
- Subgenus: Masalia; Moore, 1881

Genus of moths

Masalia was a genus of moths of the family Noctuidae. It is now considered to be a subgenus of Heliothis.

== Selected species ==
- Heliothis albida (Hampson, 1905)
- Heliothis philbyi (Brandt, 1941)
- Heliothis perstriata (Brandt, 1941)

See: Heliothis
