= Pyrocleptria =

Scientific classification
- Kingdom: Animalia
- Phylum: Arthropoda
- Class: Insecta
- Order: Lepidoptera
- Superfamily: Noctuoidea
- Family: Noctuidae
- Subfamily: Heliothinae
- Genus: Pyrocleptria; Hampson, 1903

Genus of moths

Pyrocleptria is a genus of moths of the family Noctuidae. Some authors consider it to be a subgenus of Periphanes.

== Species ==
- Pyrocleptria cora Eversmann, 1837
- Pyrocleptria naumanni Krušek & Behounek, 1996
