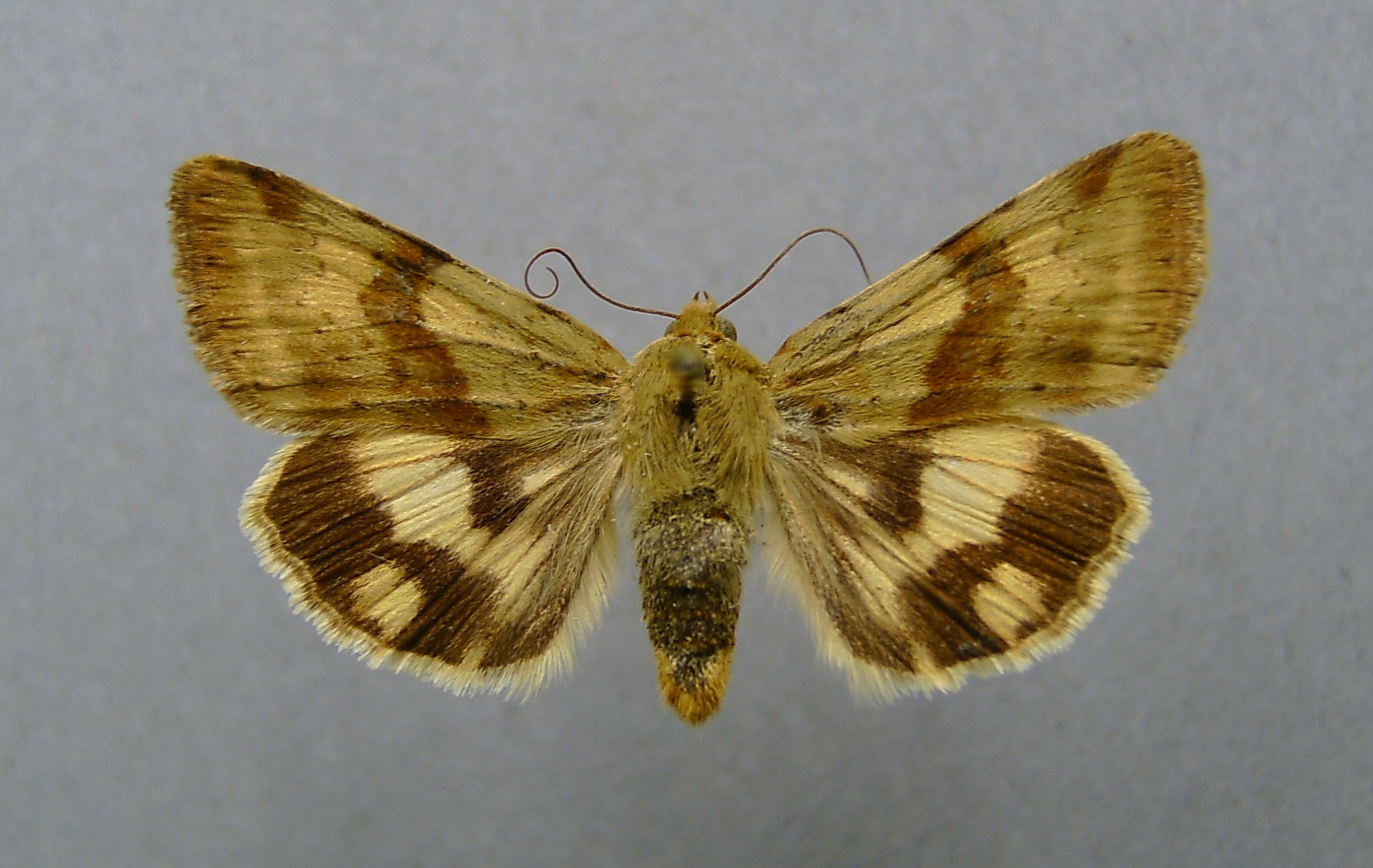

Scientific classification
- Domain: Eukaryota
- Kingdom: Animalia
- Phylum: Arthropoda
- Class: Insecta
- Order: Lepidoptera
- Superfamily: Noctuoidea
- Family: Noctuidae
- Genus: Heliothis
- Species: H. maritima

Binomial name
- Heliothis maritima Graslin, 1855

Synonyms
- Heliothis adaucta Butler 1855; Chloridea maritima

= Heliothis maritima =

Species of moth

The shoulder-striped clover (Heliothis maritima) is a species of moth of the family Noctuidae. It is found in most of Europe, Ukraine, southern Russia and southern Siberia, Transbaikalia, Turkey, central Asia, China, Japan, the Korean Peninsula, Mongolia, northern India, Pakistan, the Russian Far East (Primorye, southern Khabarovsk, the Amur region, southern Sakhalin and the southern Kuriles).

== Technical description and variation ==
C. maritima Grasl. (= spergulariae Led.). Like dipsacea L., but the apex of forewing more produced, the median shade more oblique, and the outer fascia straighter; the terminal segment of palpi blackish, without scaling; — in the ab. ferruginea Spul. the forewing is suffused with fulvous and the hindwing with deeper yellow. — Larva either grey green with fine dark dorsal line and broad dark lateral lines above the yellowish white spiracles; or reddish grey with two fine dark dorsal lines close together; or bluish grey green with black-brown lateral line. The wingspan is 30–36 mm.

== Biology ==
Adults are on wing from June to July in western Europe. Recorded food plants include Spergula, Spergularia, Calluna and Erica.
