= Heliothodes joaquin =

Scientific classification
- Domain: Eukaryota
- Kingdom: Animalia
- Phylum: Arthropoda
- Class: Insecta
- Order: Lepidoptera
- Superfamily: Noctuoidea
- Family: Noctuidae
- Genus: Heliothodes
- Species: H. joaquin

Binomial name
- Heliothodes joaquin McDunnough, 1946

Species of moth

Heliothodes joaquin is a species of moth of the family Noctuidae. It is found in the United States, including Oregon and California.

It was placed as a synonym of Heliothodes diminutiva by Harwick in a 1996. Officially it is still a synonym, but it seems to be a proper species and will probably be re-elevated to species level.
