= Heliothis australis =

Scientific classification
- Domain: Eukaryota
- Kingdom: Animalia
- Phylum: Arthropoda
- Class: Insecta
- Order: Lepidoptera
- Superfamily: Noctuoidea
- Family: Noctuidae
- Genus: Heliothis
- Species: H. australis

Binomial name
- Heliothis australis Hardwick, 1994

Species of moth

Heliothis australis is a species of moth of the family Noctuidae. It is found from Chiapas in southern Mexico northward to New Mexico and Arizona. Adults are on wing from May to October.

It was previously considered part of Heliothis phloxiphaga, but H. australis is generally larger than H. phloxiphaga or the similar Heliothis acesias.
