= Heliothis molochitina =

Scientific classification
- Domain: Eukaryota
- Kingdom: Animalia
- Phylum: Arthropoda
- Class: Insecta
- Order: Lepidoptera
- Superfamily: Noctuoidea
- Family: Noctuidae
- Genus: Heliothis
- Species: H. molochitina

Binomial name
- Heliothis molochitina (Berg, 1882)

Synonyms
- Chloridea molochitina Berg, 1882; Heliothis olivofusa (Dognin, 1907); Thyreion olivofusa Dognin, 1907; Schinia espea Smith, 1908

Species of moth

Heliothis molochitina is a species of moth of the family Noctuidae. It is found in South America, including Argentina and Brazil.
