= Heliothis disticta =

Scientific classification
- Kingdom: Animalia
- Phylum: Arthropoda
- Class: Insecta
- Order: Lepidoptera
- Superfamily: Noctuoidea
- Family: Noctuidae
- Genus: Heliothis
- Species: H. disticta

Binomial name
- Heliothis disticta (Hampson, 1902)

Synonyms
- Masalia disticta (Hampson, 1902)

Species of moth

Heliothis disticta is a species of moth of the family Noctuidae first described by George Hampson in 1902. It is found in Lesotho, Transvaal and Zimbabwe.
