= Heliothis nubila =

Scientific classification
- Kingdom: Animalia
- Phylum: Arthropoda
- Class: Insecta
- Order: Lepidoptera
- Superfamily: Noctuoidea
- Family: Noctuidae
- Genus: Heliothis
- Species: H. nubila

Binomial name
- Heliothis nubila (Hampson, 1903)

Synonyms
- Masalia nubila (Hampson, 1903); Timora nubila Hampson, 1903; Timora chrysita de Joannis, 1910

Species of moth

Heliothis nubila is a species of moth of the family Noctuidae, described by George Hampson in 1903. It is found in Burkina Faso, the Gambia, Ghana, Guinea, Mauritania, Niger, Nigeria and Senegal.
