= Timora diarhoda =

Scientific classification
- Kingdom: Animalia
- Phylum: Arthropoda
- Class: Insecta
- Order: Lepidoptera
- Superfamily: Noctuoidea
- Family: Noctuidae
- Genus: Timora
- Species: T. diarhoda

Binomial name
- Timora diarhoda Hampson, 1909

Synonyms
- Heliothis diarhoda (Hampson, 1909)

Species of moth

Timora diarhoda is a species of moth of the family Noctuidae first described by George Hampson in 1909. It is found in Africa, including South Africa.
