= Protadisura posttriphaena =

Scientific classification
- Domain: Eukaryota
- Kingdom: Animalia
- Phylum: Arthropoda
- Class: Insecta
- Order: Lepidoptera
- Superfamily: Noctuoidea
- Family: Noctuidae
- Genus: Protadisura
- Species: P. posttriphaena

Binomial name
- Protadisura posttriphaena (Rothschild, 1924)

Synonyms
- Aspila posttriphaena (Rothschild, 1924); Chloridea posttriphaena Rothschild, 1924

Species of moth

Protadisura posttriphaena is a species of moth of the family Noctuidae. It is found in Madagascar. It was recorded by Walter Rothschild in his 1924 publication Some new or noteworthy Madagascar and African Heterocera.
