= Heliothis cruentata =

Scientific classification
- Domain: Eukaryota
- Kingdom: Animalia
- Phylum: Arthropoda
- Class: Insecta
- Order: Lepidoptera
- Superfamily: Noctuoidea
- Family: Noctuidae
- Genus: Heliothis
- Species: H. cruentata

Binomial name
- Heliothis cruentata (Moore, 1881)

Synonyms
- Curubasa cruentata Moore, 1881; Curubasa marginata Moore, 1881; Timora cruentata Hampson, 1903; Masalia cruentata (Moore, 1881)

Species of moth

Heliothis cruentata is a moth of the family Noctuidae. It is found in India. It was described by Frederic Moore in 1881.
