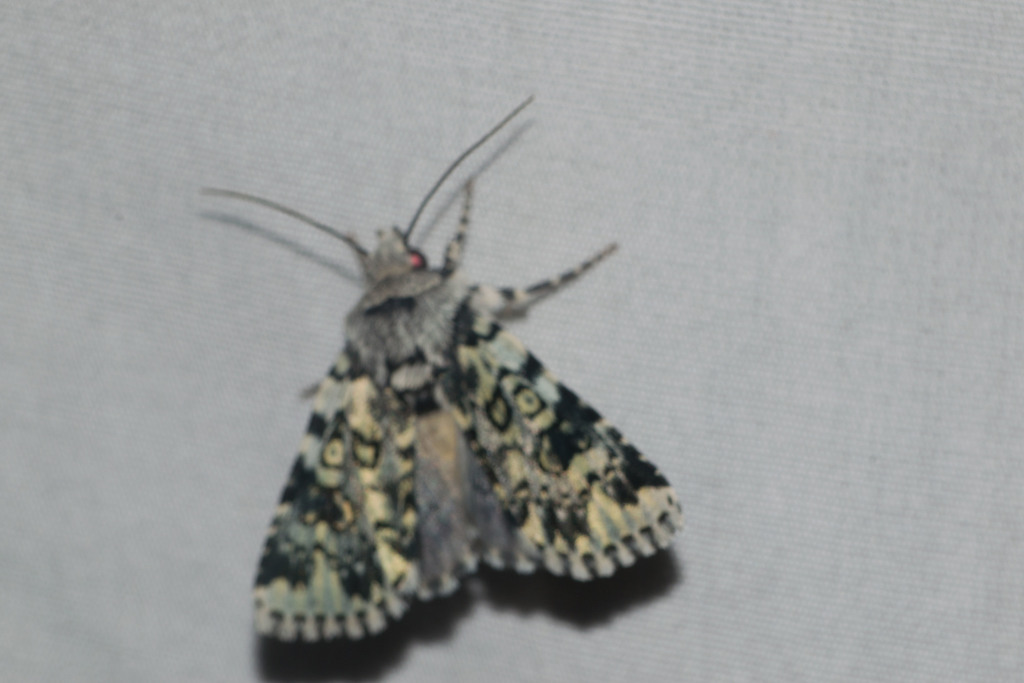

Scientific classification
- Kingdom: Animalia
- Phylum: Arthropoda
- Clade: Pancrustacea
- Class: Insecta
- Order: Lepidoptera
- Superfamily: Noctuoidea
- Family: Noctuidae
- Genus: Heliothis
- Species: H. melanoleuca

Binomial name
- Heliothis melanoleuca Mitchell, 1997

= Heliothis melanoleuca =

Species of moth

Heliothis melanoleuca is a species of moth of the family Noctuidae. It is endemic to Hawaii, where it is found in riparian forest.
