= Pyrocleptria cora =

Scientific classification
- Domain: Eukaryota
- Kingdom: Animalia
- Phylum: Arthropoda
- Class: Insecta
- Order: Lepidoptera
- Superfamily: Noctuoidea
- Family: Noctuidae
- Genus: Pyrocleptria
- Species: P. cora

Binomial name
- Pyrocleptria cora (Eversmann, 1837)

Synonyms
- Heliothis cora Eversmann, 1837; Periphanes cora (Eversmann, 1837)

Species of moth

Pyrocleptria cora is a species of moth of the family Noctuidae. It has a very scattered distribution in Europe. It is known from a few localities in Romania and Russia as well as two locations in the Hautes-Alpes in France.

The larvae feed on Thalictrum species.
