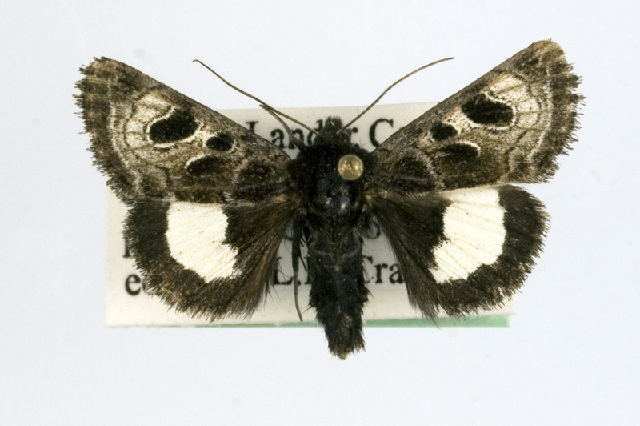

Scientific classification
- Domain: Eukaryota
- Kingdom: Animalia
- Phylum: Arthropoda
- Class: Insecta
- Order: Lepidoptera
- Superfamily: Noctuoidea
- Family: Noctuidae
- Genus: Heliothis
- Species: H. belladonna

Binomial name
- Heliothis belladonna H. Edwards, 1881

Synonyms
- Dysocnemis belladonna; Melicleptria belladonna; Heliothis anartoides

= Heliothis belladonna =

Species of moth

Heliothis belladonna is a moth of the family Noctuidae. It is found in North America, including Washington.
