= Heliothis xanthia =

Scientific classification
- Domain: Eukaryota
- Kingdom: Animalia
- Phylum: Arthropoda
- Class: Insecta
- Order: Lepidoptera
- Superfamily: Noctuoidea
- Family: Noctuidae
- Genus: Heliothis
- Species: H. xanthia

Binomial name
- Heliothis xanthia Angulo y Olivares, 1999

Species of moth

Heliothis xanthia is a species of moth of the family Noctuidae. It is found in South America, including and possibly limited to Argentina.
