= Melaporphyria immortua =

Scientific classification
- Domain: Eukaryota
- Kingdom: Animalia
- Phylum: Arthropoda
- Class: Insecta
- Order: Lepidoptera
- Superfamily: Noctuoidea
- Family: Noctuidae
- Genus: Melaporphyria
- Species: M. immortua

Binomial name
- Melaporphyria immortua Grote, 1874

Species of moth

Melaporphyria immortua, the dark-banded flower gem, is a moth of the family Noctuidae. The species was first described by Augustus Radcliffe Grote in 1874. It is found in North America from New England west to Colorado, north to southern Manitoba, central Saskatchewan and Alberta.

The wingspan is about 22 mm (0.87 in). Adults are on wing from May to June.

The larval host plants are unknown, although there are some records of unknown origin that it feeds on lupine. Reports on Thalictrum species probably refer to nectaring.
