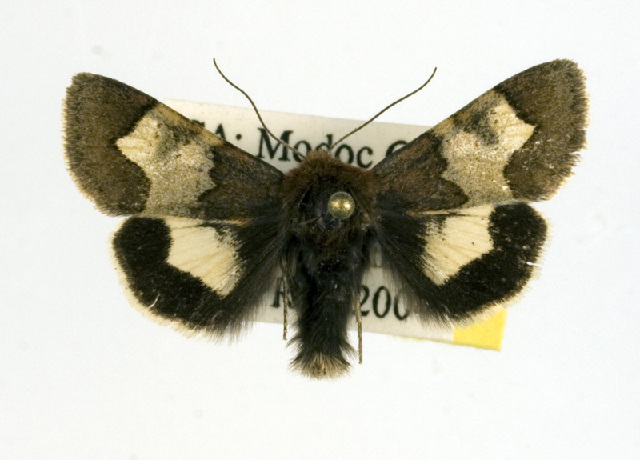

Scientific classification
- Kingdom: Animalia
- Phylum: Arthropoda
- Class: Insecta
- Order: Lepidoptera
- Superfamily: Noctuoidea
- Family: Noctuidae
- Genus: Heliothis
- Species: H. proruptus

Binomial name
- Heliothis proruptus Grote, 1873

Synonyms
- Heliothis fimbria (Williams, 1905); Heliothis venustus (H. Edwards, 1875); Heliothis prorupta Grote 1873

= Heliothis proruptus =

Species of moth

Heliothis proruptus is a species of moth of the family Noctuidae. It is found in North America, including California and Oregon.

The wingspan is about 27 mm.
