= Heliothis pauliani =

Scientific classification
- Kingdom: Animalia
- Phylum: Arthropoda
- Class: Insecta
- Order: Lepidoptera
- Superfamily: Noctuoidea
- Family: Noctuidae
- Genus: Heliothis
- Species: H. pauliani

Binomial name
- Heliothis pauliani Viette, 1959

Species of moth

Heliothis pauliani is a species of moth of the family Noctuidae first described by Pierre Viette in 1959. It is found in Africa, including South Africa.
