= Heliothis conifera =

Scientific classification
- Kingdom: Animalia
- Phylum: Arthropoda
- Class: Insecta
- Order: Lepidoptera
- Superfamily: Noctuoidea
- Family: Noctuidae
- Genus: Heliothis
- Species: H. conifera

Binomial name
- Heliothis conifera (Hampson, 1913)

Synonyms
- Chloridea conifera Hampson, 1913; Aspila conifera (Hampson, 1913)

Species of moth

Heliothis conifera is a species of moth of the family Noctuidae first described by George Hampson in 1913. It is found in Africa, including South Africa.
