= Baptarma felicita =

Scientific classification
- Domain: Eukaryota
- Kingdom: Animalia
- Phylum: Arthropoda
- Class: Insecta
- Order: Lepidoptera
- Superfamily: Noctuoidea
- Family: Noctuidae
- Genus: Baptarma
- Species: B. felicita

Binomial name
- Baptarma felicita Smith, 1904

Species of moth

Baptarma felicita is a species of moth of the family Noctuidae. It is found in North America, including California and Arizona.

The wingspan is about 22–24 mm.
