= Heliothis sturmhoefeli =

Scientific classification
- Domain: Eukaryota
- Kingdom: Animalia
- Phylum: Arthropoda
- Class: Insecta
- Order: Lepidoptera
- Superfamily: Noctuoidea
- Family: Noctuidae
- Genus: Heliothis
- Species: H. sturmhoefeli

Binomial name
- Heliothis sturmhoefeli Draudt, 1927

Species of moth

Heliothis sturmhoefeli is a species of moth of the family Noctuidae. It is found in South America, including Brazil.
