= Stenoecia dos =

Scientific classification
- Kingdom: Animalia
- Phylum: Arthropoda
- Class: Insecta
- Order: Lepidoptera
- Superfamily: Noctuoidea
- Family: Noctuidae
- Genus: Stenoecia
- Species: S. dos

Binomial name
- Stenoecia dos (Freyer, 1838)

Synonyms
- Heliothis dos Freyer, 1838

Species of moth

Stenoecia dos is a species of moth of the family Noctuidae. It is known in south-eastern Europe, including Bosnia and Herzegovina, Croatia, North Macedonia, Slovenia, Serbia, Kosovo, Voivodina and Montenegro, as well as in Turkey.

The wingspan is about 20 mm.
