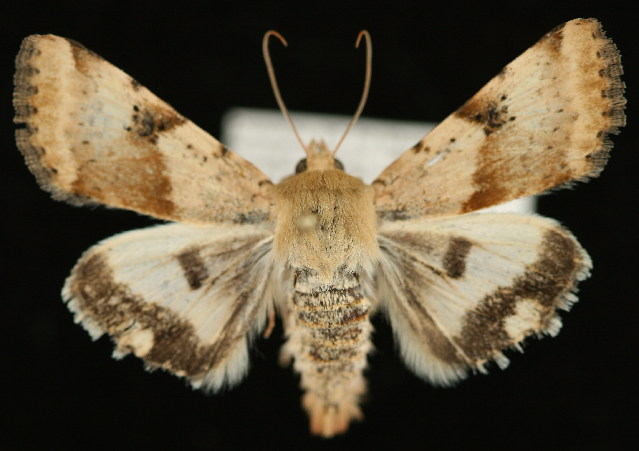

Scientific classification
- Kingdom: Animalia
- Phylum: Arthropoda
- Class: Insecta
- Order: Lepidoptera
- Superfamily: Noctuoidea
- Family: Noctuidae
- Genus: Heliothis
- Species: H. phloxiphaga

Binomial name
- Heliothis phloxiphaga Grote and Robinson, 1867

Synonyms
- Heliothis interjacens Grote, 1880

= Heliothis phloxiphaga =

Species of moth

Heliothis phloxiphaga is a species of moth of the family Noctuidae. It is found in the United States and southern Canada. It feeds on a variety of plants, and the caterpillars are considered pests to certain trees, including Ulmus, Malus, and Prunus. Adults are on-wing during the summer.

Heliothis acesias and Heliothis australis were previously grouped with H. phloxiphaga.
