= Heliothis hoarei =

Scientific classification
- Domain: Eukaryota
- Kingdom: Animalia
- Phylum: Arthropoda
- Class: Insecta
- Order: Lepidoptera
- Superfamily: Noctuoidea
- Family: Noctuidae
- Genus: Heliothis
- Species: H. hoarei

Binomial name
- Heliothis hoarei Matthews, 1999

Species of moth

Heliothis hoarei is a species of moth of the family Noctuidae. It is endemic to the Northern Territory and Queensland.
