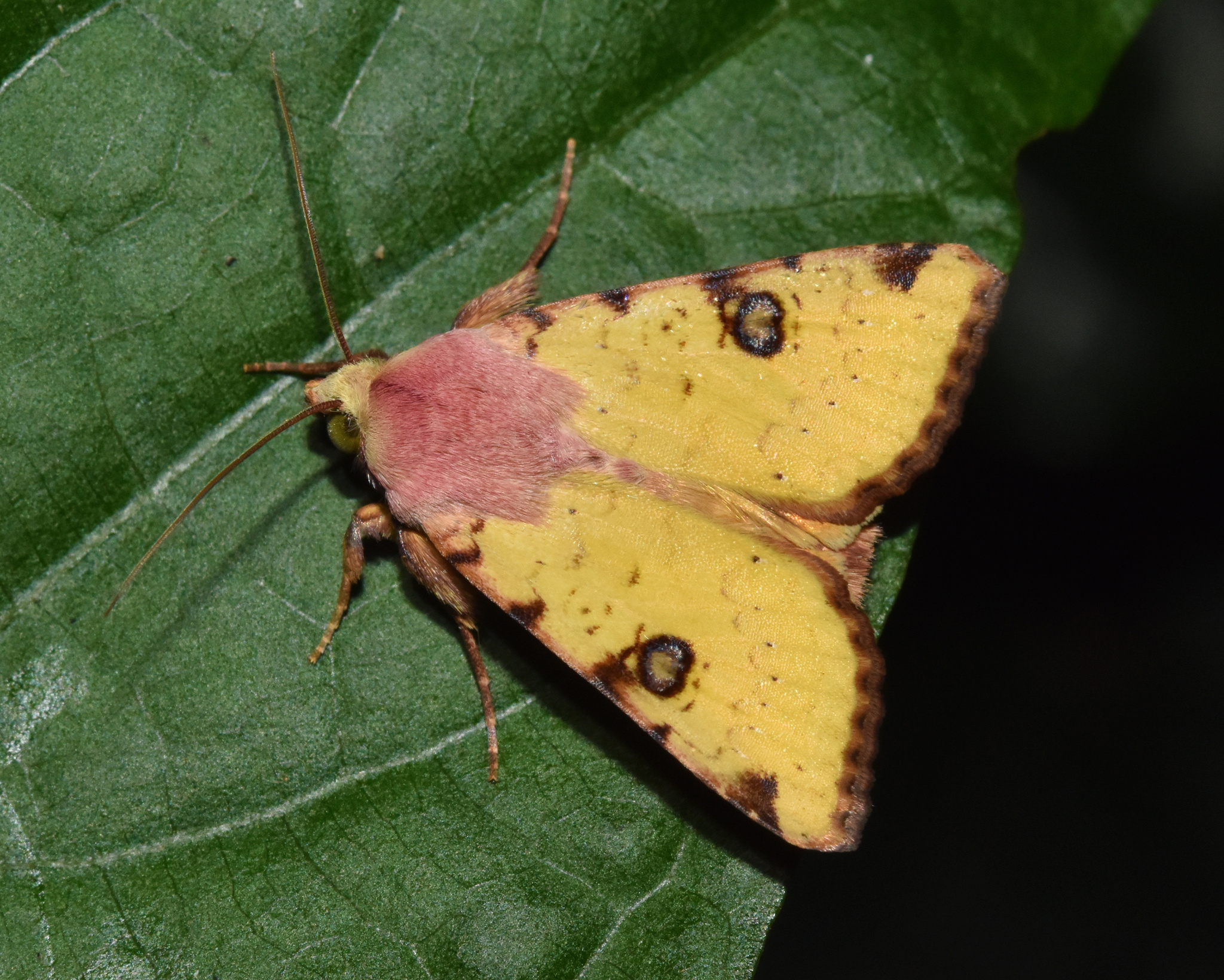

Scientific classification
- Kingdom: Animalia
- Phylum: Arthropoda
- Class: Insecta
- Order: Lepidoptera
- Superfamily: Noctuoidea
- Family: Noctuidae
- Genus: Heliothis
- Species: H. flavigera

Binomial name
- Heliothis flavigera (Hampson, 1907)

Synonyms
- Chloridea flavigera Hampson, 1907; Heliothis insularis Viette, 1967

= Heliothis flavigera =

Species of moth

Heliothis flavigera is a species of moth of the family Noctuidae first described by George Hampson in 1907. It is found in Africa, including South Africa and Ethiopia.
