= Pyrocleptria naumanni =

Scientific classification
- Domain: Eukaryota
- Kingdom: Animalia
- Phylum: Arthropoda
- Class: Insecta
- Order: Lepidoptera
- Superfamily: Noctuoidea
- Family: Noctuidae
- Genus: Pyrocleptria
- Species: P. naumanni

Binomial name
- Pyrocleptria naumanni Krušek & Behounek, 1996

Synonyms
- Periphanes naumanni (Eversmann 1837)

Species of moth

Pyrocleptria naumanni is a species of moth of the family Noctuidae. It is only known from North-eastern Tibet.
