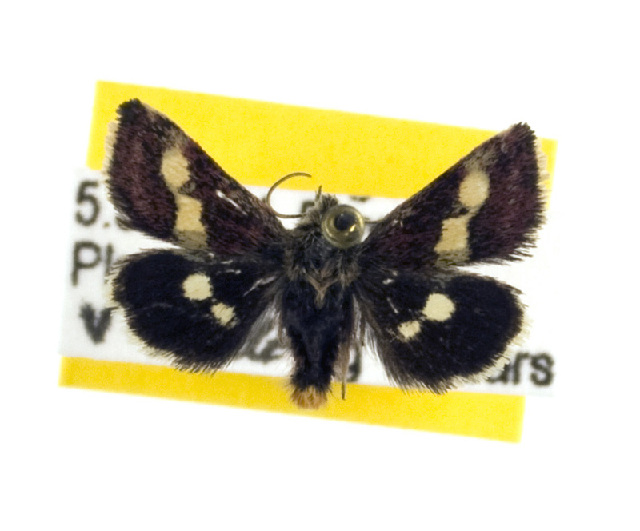

Scientific classification
- Domain: Eukaryota
- Kingdom: Animalia
- Phylum: Arthropoda
- Class: Insecta
- Order: Lepidoptera
- Superfamily: Noctuoidea
- Family: Noctuidae
- Genus: Microhelia
- Species: M. angelica

Binomial name
- Microhelia angelica (Smith, 1900)

Synonyms
- Microhelia restrictalis (Smith, 1900); Microhelia immacula Strand, 1912

= Microhelia angelica =

Species of moth

Microhelia angelica is a species of moth of the family Noctuidae. It is found from California to Washington.

The wingspan is 9–13 mm.
