= Heliothis philbyi =

Scientific classification
- Kingdom: Animalia
- Phylum: Arthropoda
- Class: Insecta
- Order: Lepidoptera
- Superfamily: Noctuoidea
- Family: Noctuidae
- Genus: Heliothis
- Subgenus: Masalia
- Species: H. philbyi

Binomial name
- Heliothis philbyi (Brandt, 1941)

Synonyms
- Timora philbyi Brandt, 1941; Timora philbyi nuristana Boursin, 1960; Timora philbyi arabica Boursin, 1960; Masalia philbyi (Brandt, 1941) Seymour, 1972

Species of moth

Heliothis philbyi is a species of moth of the family Noctuidae. It is found in the Middle East, including Saudi Arabia, Iran and Oman.
