= Micriantha decorata =

Scientific classification
- Kingdom: Animalia
- Phylum: Arthropoda
- Class: Insecta
- Order: Lepidoptera
- Superfamily: Noctuoidea
- Family: Noctuidae
- Genus: Micriantha
- Species: M. decorata

Binomial name
- Micriantha decorata (Frivaldsky, 1845)

Synonyms
- Heliothis decorata Frivaldsky, 1845; Anthoecia violacea Herrich-Schäffer, 1851

Species of moth

Micriantha decorata is a species of moth of the family Noctuidae. It is found in Turkey.
