= Timora albisticta =

Scientific classification
- Domain: Eukaryota
- Kingdom: Animalia
- Phylum: Arthropoda
- Class: Insecta
- Order: Lepidoptera
- Superfamily: Noctuoidea
- Family: Noctuidae
- Genus: Timora
- Species: T. albisticta

Binomial name
- Timora albisticta Janse, 1917

Synonyms
- Heliothis albisticta (Janse, 1917)

Species of moth

Timora albisticta is a species of moth of the family Noctuidae first described by Anthonie Johannes Theodorus Janse in 1917. It is found in Africa, including in South Africa.
