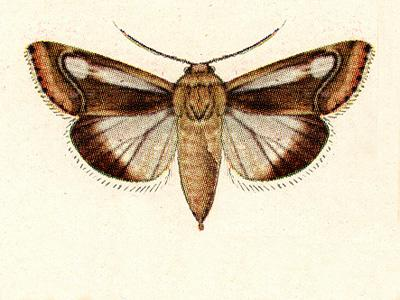

Scientific classification
- Kingdom: Animalia
- Phylum: Arthropoda
- Class: Insecta
- Order: Lepidoptera
- Superfamily: Noctuoidea
- Family: Noctuidae
- Genus: Heliothis
- Species: H. lucilinea

Binomial name
- Heliothis lucilinea Walker, 1858

Synonyms
- Schinia lucilinea (Walker, 1858)

= Heliothis lucilinea =

Species of moth

Heliothis lucilinea is a species of moth of the family Noctuidae. It is found on Hispaniola and Jamaica.
