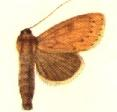

Scientific classification
- Domain: Eukaryota
- Kingdom: Animalia
- Phylum: Arthropoda
- Class: Insecta
- Order: Lepidoptera
- Superfamily: Noctuoidea
- Family: Noctuidae
- Genus: Timora
- Species: T. sinuata

Binomial name
- Timora sinuata (Moore, 1881 )

Synonyms
- Sophaga sinuata Moore, 1881

= Timora sinuata =

Species of moth

Timora sinuata is a species of moth of the family Noctuidae. It is known from India.

The wingspan is about 32 mm (1 1/4 in). The forewing is pale yellow, with a broad transverse dark ochreous-yellow median band. The hindwing is pale greyish ochreous, the discal area is brownish.
