= Melaporphyria =

Scientific classification
- Kingdom: Animalia
- Phylum: Arthropoda
- Class: Insecta
- Order: Lepidoptera
- Superfamily: Noctuoidea
- Family: Noctuidae
- Subfamily: Heliothinae
- Genus: Melaporphyria; Grote, 1874

Genus of moths

Melaporphyria is a genus of moths of the family Noctuidae.

== Species ==
- Melaporphyria immortua Grote, 1874
