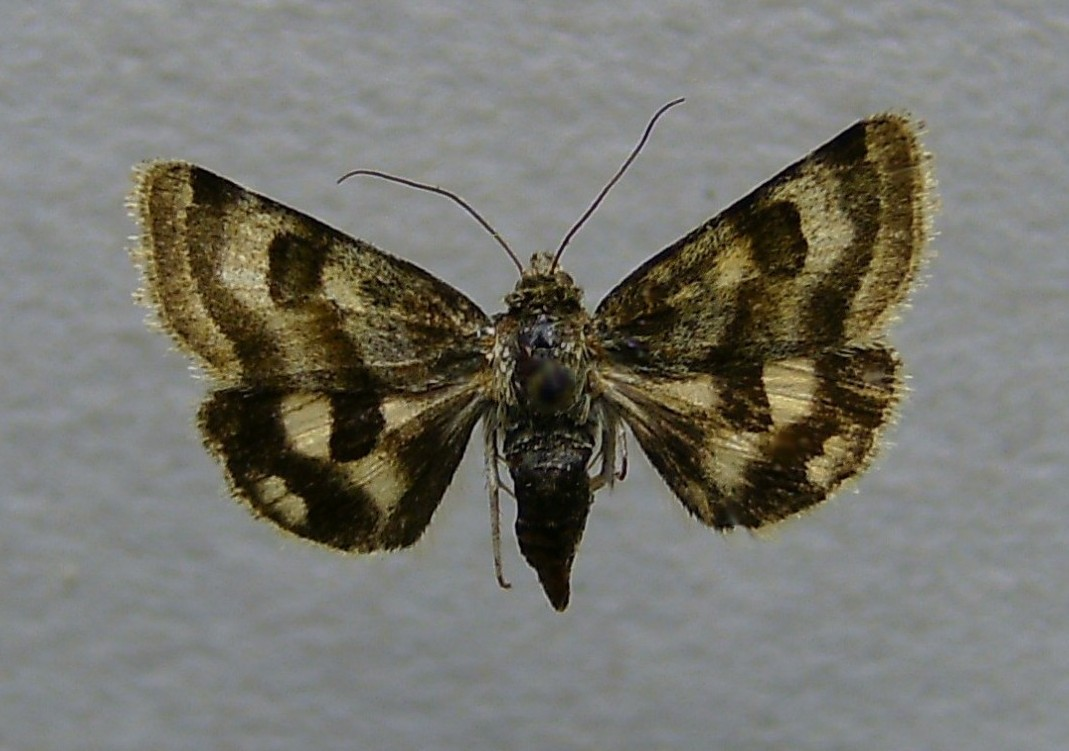

Scientific classification
- Domain: Eukaryota
- Kingdom: Animalia
- Phylum: Arthropoda
- Class: Insecta
- Order: Lepidoptera
- Superfamily: Noctuoidea
- Family: Noctuidae
- Genus: Heliothis
- Species: H. ononis

Binomial name
- Heliothis ononis (Denis & Schiffermüller, 1775)

Synonyms
- Noctua ononis [Denis & Schiffermuller], 1775; Melicleptria septentrionalis H. Edwards, 1775; Heliothis ononidis Guenee, 1775; Heliothis intensiva (Warren, 1911); Heliothis lugubris Klemensiewicz, 1912

= Heliothis ononis =

Species of moth

Heliothis ononis, the flax bollworm, is a moth of the family Noctuidae. The species was first described by Michael Denis and Ignaz Schiffermüller in 1775. It is found in China, Kazakhstan, central Asia, northern Mongolia (Khangai), the Russian Far East (Primorye, the Amur region, the southern Kuriles), the Korean Peninsula, southern European part of Russia, southern and central Europe, southern and eastern Siberia (Transbaikalia, Yakutia) and Turkey. In North America it is found from south-central Manitoba west to British Columbia, north to the Northwest Territories and Yukon and Alaska and south to Colorado.

The wingspan is 24–26 mm. Adults are on the wing from May to July in North America.

The larvae feed on Linum species.
