= Heliothis oregonica =

Scientific classification
- Domain: Eukaryota
- Kingdom: Animalia
- Phylum: Arthropoda
- Class: Insecta
- Order: Lepidoptera
- Superfamily: Noctuoidea
- Family: Noctuidae
- Genus: Heliothis
- Species: H. oregonica

Binomial name
- Heliothis oregonica (H. Edwards, 1875)

Synonyms
- Heliothis oregonicus; Melicleptria oregonica H. Edwards, 1875

Species of moth

Heliothis oregonica, the Oregon gem, is a moth of the family Noctuidae. The species was first described by Henry Edwards in 1875. It is found in North America from the Peace River area of Alberta south and west in the mountains to California and Arizona. There is also a disjunct population in north central Quebec.

The wingspan is 24–30 mm. Adults are on wing from June to August.
