= Hebdomochondra syrticola =

Scientific classification
- Kingdom: Animalia
- Phylum: Arthropoda
- Class: Insecta
- Order: Lepidoptera
- Superfamily: Noctuoidea
- Family: Noctuidae
- Genus: Hebdomochondra
- Species: H. syrticola

Binomial name
- Hebdomochondra syrticola Staudinger, 1879

Synonyms
- Heliocheilus syrticola (Staudinger, 1879)

Species of moth

Hebdomochondra syrticola is a species of moth of the family Noctuidae. It is found in Turkmenistan and southern Russia.
