= Heliothis uncta =

Scientific classification
- Kingdom: Animalia
- Phylum: Arthropoda
- Class: Insecta
- Order: Lepidoptera
- Superfamily: Noctuoidea
- Family: Noctuidae
- Genus: Heliothis
- Species: H. uncta

Binomial name
- Heliothis uncta (Swinhoe, 1885)

Synonyms
- Masalia uncta (Swinhoe, 1885); Adisura uncta Swinhoe, 1885

Species of moth

Heliothis uncta is a species of moth of the family Noctuidae. It is found in India and Pakistan.
