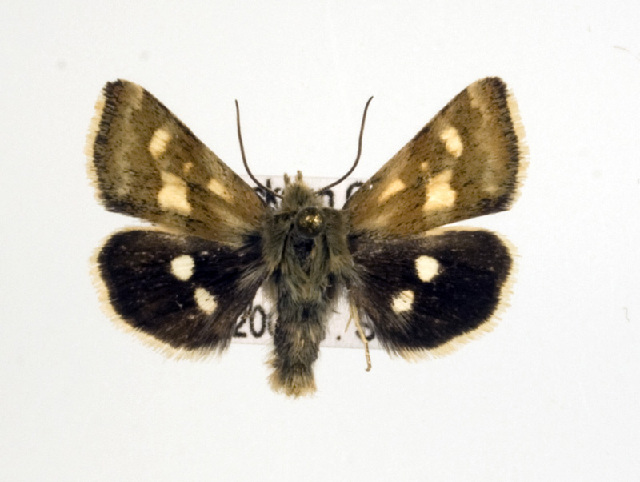
- Heliothodes diminutivus

Scientific classification
- Kingdom: Animalia
- Phylum: Arthropoda
- Class: Insecta
- Order: Lepidoptera
- Superfamily: Noctuoidea
- Family: Noctuidae
- Subfamily: Heliothinae
- Genus: Heliothodes; Hampson, 1910

Species
- See text

= Heliothodes =

Genus of moths

Heliothodes is a genus of moths of the family Noctuidae.

== Species ==
The genus includes the following species:

- Heliothodes diminutivus (Grote, 1873)
- Heliothodes joaquin McDunnough, 1946
