= Heliothis decorata =

Scientific classification
- Kingdom: Animalia
- Phylum: Arthropoda
- Clade: Pancrustacea
- Class: Insecta
- Order: Lepidoptera
- Superfamily: Noctuoidea
- Family: Noctuidae
- Genus: Heliothis
- Species: H. decorata

Binomial name
- Heliothis decorata (Moore, 1881)

Synonyms
- Masalia decorata Moore, 1881; Pradatta decorata Moore, 1881; Timora buchanani Rothschild, 1921

Species of moth

Heliothis decorata is a species of moth of the family Noctuidae. It is found in India.
