= Baptarma =

Scientific classification
- Domain: Eukaryota
- Kingdom: Animalia
- Phylum: Arthropoda
- Class: Insecta
- Order: Lepidoptera
- Superfamily: Noctuoidea
- Family: Noctuidae
- Subfamily: Heliothinae
- Genus: Baptarma; Smith, 1904

Genus of moths

Baptarma is a genus of moths of the family Noctuidae.

== Species ==
- Baptarma felicita Smith, 1904
