= Heliothis cystiphora =

Scientific classification
- Kingdom: Animalia
- Phylum: Arthropoda
- Class: Insecta
- Order: Lepidoptera
- Superfamily: Noctuoidea
- Family: Noctuidae
- Genus: Heliothis
- Species: H. cystiphora

Binomial name
- Heliothis cystiphora (Wallengren, 1860)

Synonyms
- Anthoecia inflata Wallengren, 1860; Anthoecia onca Wallengren, 1860; Anthoecia cystiphora Wallengren, 1860; Heliothis inflata (Wallengren, 1860); Heliothis onca (Wallengren, 1860)

Species of moth

Heliothis cystiphora is a species of moth of the family Noctuidae. It is found in Central America, South America and the Galapagos. It is known to visit the flower Encelia hispida on the island of Isla Santa Fe in the Galapagos.
