= Hebdomochondra =

Scientific classification
- Kingdom: Animalia
- Phylum: Arthropoda
- Class: Insecta
- Order: Lepidoptera
- Superfamily: Noctuoidea
- Family: Noctuidae
- Subfamily: Heliothinae
- Genus: Hebdomochondra; Staudinger, 1879

Genus of moths

Hebdomochondra is a genus of moths of the family Noctuidae.

== Species ==
- Hebdomochondra syrticola Staudinger, 1879
