= Heliothis quilengesi =

Scientific classification
- Kingdom: Animalia
- Phylum: Arthropoda
- Class: Insecta
- Order: Lepidoptera
- Superfamily: Noctuoidea
- Family: Noctuidae
- Genus: Heliothis
- Species: H. quilengesi

Binomial name
- Heliothis quilengesi Seymour, 1972

Synonyms
- Masalia quilengesi (Seymour, 1972)

Species of moth

Heliothis quilengesi is a species of moth of the family Noctuidae first described by P. R. Seymour in 1972. It is found in Africa, including South Africa and Angola.
