= Protadisura =

Scientific classification
- Domain: Eukaryota
- Kingdom: Animalia
- Phylum: Arthropoda
- Class: Insecta
- Order: Lepidoptera
- Superfamily: Noctuoidea
- Family: Noctuidae
- Subfamily: Heliothinae
- Genus: Protadisura; Matthews, 1991

Genus of moths

Protadisura is a genus of moths of the family Noctuidae.

== Species ==
- Protadisura posttriphaena Rothschild, 1924
