= Heliothis borealis =

Scientific classification
- Kingdom: Animalia
- Phylum: Arthropoda
- Class: Insecta
- Order: Lepidoptera
- Superfamily: Noctuoidea
- Family: Noctuidae
- Genus: Heliothis
- Species: H. borealis

Binomial name
- Heliothis borealis (Hampson, 1903)

Synonyms
- Dysocnemis borealis Hampson, 1903

Species of moth

Heliothis borealis, the boreal gem, is a moth of the family Noctuidae. The species was first described by George Hampson in 1903. It is found in North America from Quebec west to Alberta, and south in the mountains to south-western Montana.

The wingspan is 22–25 mm. Adults are on wing from May to June.

The larvae probably feed on the buds, flowers and seeds of various low plants.
