= Heliothis roseivena =

Scientific classification
- Kingdom: Animalia
- Phylum: Arthropoda
- Class: Insecta
- Order: Lepidoptera
- Superfamily: Noctuoidea
- Family: Noctuidae
- Genus: Heliothis
- Species: H. roseivena

Binomial name
- Heliothis roseivena (Walker, 1866)

Synonyms
- Masalia roseivena (Walker, 1866); Leucania roseivena Walker, 1866; Leucania alarioides Butler, A.G. 1886

Species of moth

Heliothis roseivena is a species of moth of the family Noctuidae. It is found in the Northern Territory, Queensland and Western Australia and on Lombok and Flores in Indonesia.

The wingspan is about 25 millimetres (0.98 in).
