= Heliothis sublimis =

Scientific classification
- Domain: Eukaryota
- Kingdom: Animalia
- Phylum: Arthropoda
- Class: Insecta
- Order: Lepidoptera
- Superfamily: Noctuoidea
- Family: Noctuidae
- Genus: Heliothis
- Species: H. sublimis

Binomial name
- Heliothis sublimis (Berio, 1962)

Synonyms
- Masalia sublimis Berio, 1962

Species of moth

Heliothis sublimis is a species of moth of the family Noctuidae first described by Emilio Berio in 1962. It is found in Africa, including South Africa.
