= Heliothis transvaalica =

Scientific classification
- Domain: Eukaryota
- Kingdom: Animalia
- Phylum: Arthropoda
- Class: Insecta
- Order: Lepidoptera
- Superfamily: Noctuoidea
- Family: Noctuidae
- Genus: Heliothis
- Species: H. transvaalica

Binomial name
- Heliothis transvaalica (Distant, 1902)

Synonyms
- Masalia transvaalica (Distant, 1902); Timora transvaalica Distant, 1902; Timora rosea Gaede, 1915; Timora rhodomelaleuca Berio, 1941

Species of moth

Heliothis transvaalica is a species of moth of the family Noctuidae first described by William Lucas Distant in 1902. It is found in Transvaal of South Africa and in Namibia.

This species has a wingspan of 28–30 mm.
