= Stenoecia =

Scientific classification
- Kingdom: Animalia
- Phylum: Arthropoda
- Class: Insecta
- Order: Lepidoptera
- Superfamily: Noctuoidea
- Family: Noctuidae
- Subfamily: Heliothinae
- Genus: Stenoecia; Warren, 1911

Genus of moths

Stenoecia is a genus of moths of the family Noctuidae.

== Species ==
- Stenoecia dos (Freyer, 1838)
