= Heliothis flavescens =

Scientific classification
- Domain: Eukaryota
- Kingdom: Animalia
- Phylum: Arthropoda
- Class: Insecta
- Order: Lepidoptera
- Superfamily: Noctuoidea
- Family: Noctuidae
- Genus: Heliothis
- Species: H. flavescens

Binomial name
- Heliothis flavescens (Janse, 1917)

Synonyms
- Chloridea flavescens Janse, 1917

Species of moth

Heliothis flavescens is a species of moth of the family Noctuidae first described by Anthonie Johannes Theodorus Janse in 1917. It is found in Africa, including South Africa and Eswatini.
