= Heliothis albipuncta =

Scientific classification
- Kingdom: Animalia
- Phylum: Arthropoda
- Class: Insecta
- Order: Lepidoptera
- Superfamily: Noctuoidea
- Family: Noctuidae
- Genus: Heliothis
- Species: H. albipuncta

Binomial name
- Heliothis albipuncta (Hampson, 1910)

Synonyms
- Masalia albipuncta (Hampson, 1910); Timora albipuncta Hampson, 1910

Species of moth

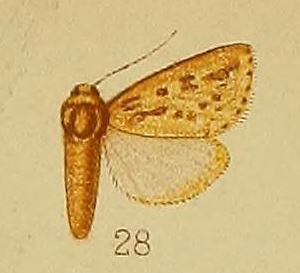
Heliothis albipuncta

Heliothis albipuncta is a species of moth of the family Noctuidae first described by George Hampson in 1910. It is found in Africa, including South Africa.
