= Micriantha =

Scientific classification
- Kingdom: Animalia
- Phylum: Arthropoda
- Class: Insecta
- Order: Lepidoptera
- Superfamily: Noctuoidea
- Family: Noctuidae
- Subfamily: Heliothinae
- Genus: Micriantha; Hampson, 1908

Genus of moths

Micriantha is a genus of moths of the family Noctuidae.

== Species ==
- Micriantha decorata Frivaldsky, 1845
