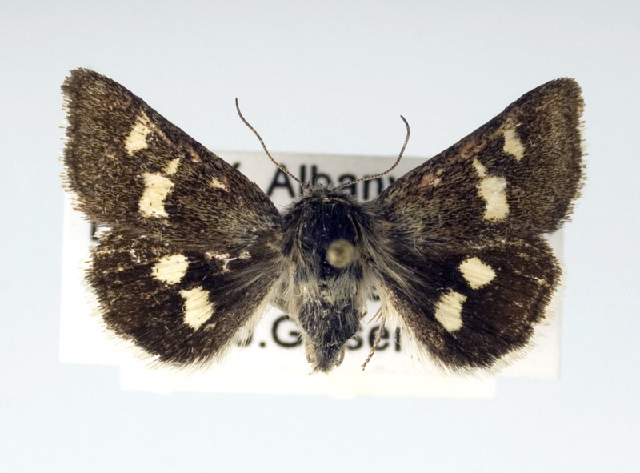
- Eutricopis nexilis

Scientific classification
- Domain: Eukaryota
- Kingdom: Animalia
- Phylum: Arthropoda
- Class: Insecta
- Order: Lepidoptera
- Superfamily: Noctuoidea
- Family: Noctuidae
- Subfamily: Heliothinae
- Genus: Eutricopis; Morrison, 1875

= Eutricopis =

Genus of moths

Eutricopis is a genus of moths of the family Noctuidae.

== Species ==
- Eutricopis nexilis Morrison, 1875
