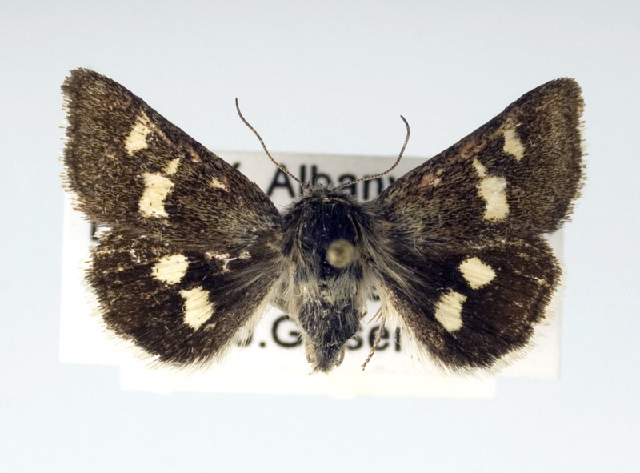

Scientific classification
- Domain: Eukaryota
- Kingdom: Animalia
- Phylum: Arthropoda
- Class: Insecta
- Order: Lepidoptera
- Superfamily: Noctuoidea
- Family: Noctuidae
- Genus: Eutricopis
- Species: E. nexilis

Binomial name
- Eutricopis nexilis Morrison, 1875

Synonyms
- Eutricopis elaborata (H. Edwards, 1881); Eutricopis nexilis subcolorata

= Eutricopis nexilis =

Species of moth

Eutricopis nexilis, the white-spotted midget, is a moth of the family Noctuidae. The species was first described by Herbert Knowles Morrison in 1875. It is found in North America from Nova Scotia and New England west across southern Canada to southern Vancouver Island, north to Yukon and south in the mountains to California and Colorado.

The wingspan is 18–20 mm. Adults are on wing from May to July.

The larvae feed on Antennaria species.
