= Heliothis galatheae =

Scientific classification
- Kingdom: Animalia
- Phylum: Arthropoda
- Class: Insecta
- Order: Lepidoptera
- Superfamily: Noctuoidea
- Family: Noctuidae
- Genus: Heliothis
- Species: H. galatheae

Binomial name
- Heliothis galatheae (Wallengren, 1856)

Synonyms
- Leocyma galatheae Wallengren, 1856; Alaria lanceolata Walker, 1865; Adisura splendens Druce, 1887; Adisura imitata Druce, 1889; Curubasa depicta Swinhoe, 1891; Timora nigrolineata Aurivillius, 1925; Timora lancea Berio, 1953; Masalia galatheae bechuana Seymour, 1972; Masalia galatheae (Wallengren, 1856); Thria galatheae (Wallengren, 1856)

Species of moth

Heliothis galatheae is a species of moth of the family Noctuidae first described by Hans Daniel Johan Wallengren in 1856. It is found all over Africa, including South Africa to Ethiopia and the Gambia.
