= Heliothis xanthiata =

Scientific classification
- Kingdom: Animalia
- Phylum: Arthropoda
- Class: Insecta
- Order: Lepidoptera
- Superfamily: Noctuoidea
- Family: Noctuidae
- Genus: Heliothis
- Species: H. xanthiata

Binomial name
- Heliothis xanthiata Walker, 1865

Species of moth

Heliothis xanthiata is a species of moth of the family Noctuidae first described by Francis Walker in 1865. It is found in Africa, including and possibly limited to South Africa and Lesotho.
