= Timora daphoena =

Scientific classification
- Kingdom: Animalia
- Phylum: Arthropoda
- Class: Insecta
- Order: Lepidoptera
- Superfamily: Noctuoidea
- Family: Noctuidae
- Genus: Timora
- Species: T. daphoena

Binomial name
- Timora daphoena Hampson, 1910

Synonyms
- Heliothis daphoena (Hampson, 1910)

Species of moth

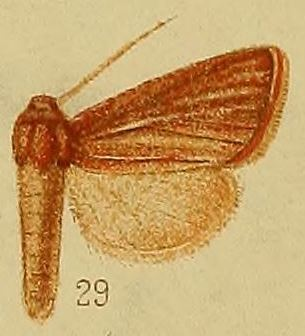
Timora daphoena

Timora daphoena is a species of moth of the family Noctuidae first described by George Hampson in 1910. It is found in Africa, including South Africa.
