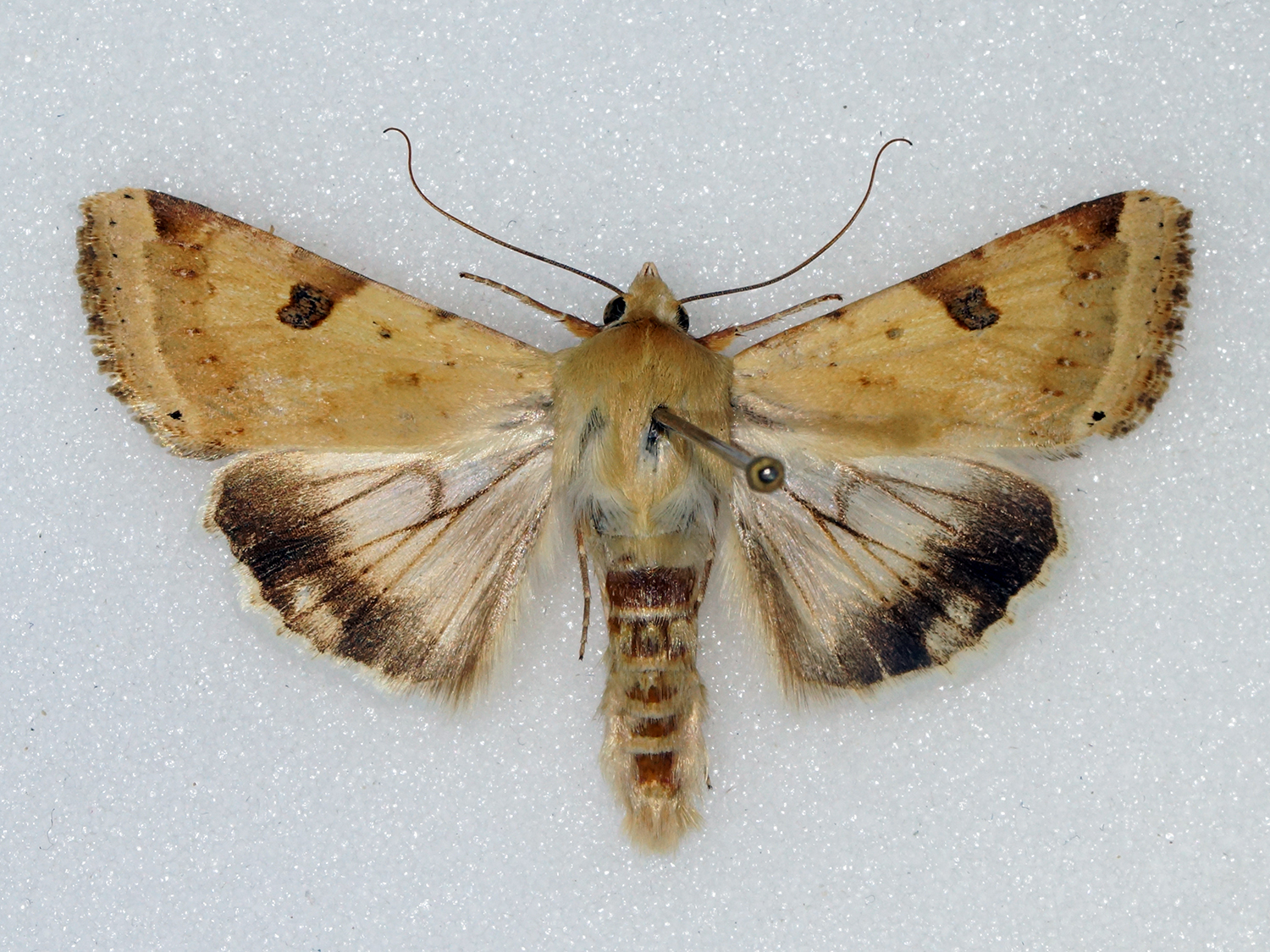
- Heliothis peltigera

Scientific classification
- Kingdom: Animalia
- Phylum: Arthropoda
- Clade: Pancrustacea
- Class: Insecta
- Order: Lepidoptera
- Superfamily: Noctuoidea
- Family: Noctuidae
- Subfamily: Heliothinae; Boisduval, 1828

Genera
- See text

= Heliothinae =

Subfamily of moths

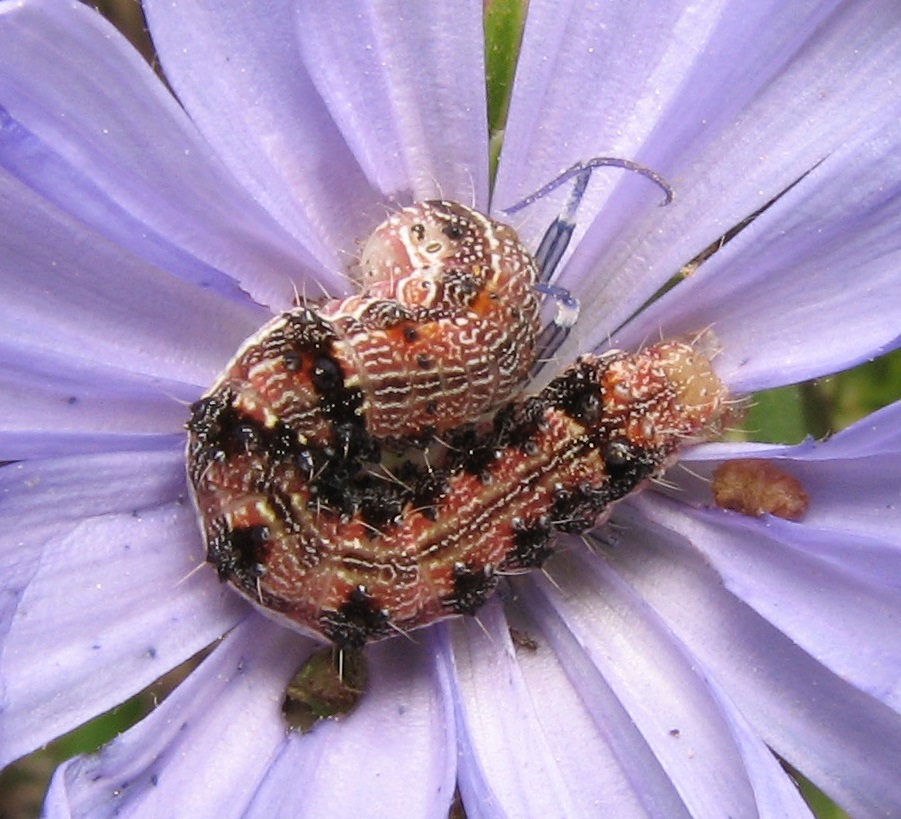
Chloridea virescens larva

Heliothinae is a small, cosmopolitan subfamily of moths in the family Noctuidae, with about 400 described species worldwide. It includes a number of economically significant agricultural pest species, such as Helicoverpa armigera and Helicoverpa zea.

== Taxonomy ==
The subfamily has been studied extensively. Important works include studies by Hardwick (1965 and 1970) and Matthews (1988).

== Distribution and diversity ==
Heliothinae is a cosmopolitan subfamily of around 400 species. Its species thrive in hot, dry regions of the world, and the subfamily has its highest species diversity in seasonally-arid tropics and subtropics, such as those found Australia, sections of Asia, the southwest region of the United States, and Africa.

== Larvae ==
The subfamily includes both specialist species, of which the larvae feed on only a limited range of plants, and polyphagous generalist species.

The subfamily contains several agricultural pests, including Helicoverpa armigera, Helicoverpa assulta, Helicoverpa zea, Helicoverpa punctigera and Heliothis virescens.

== Genera ==
The subfamily includes the following genera:

- Adisura Moore, 1881
- Aedophron Lederer, 1857
- Australothis Matthews, 1991
- Baptarma Smith, 1904
- Chloridea Duncan & Westwood, 1841
- Chazaria Moore, 1881
- Derrima Walker, 1858
- Eutricopis Morrison, 1875
- Hebdomochondra Staudinger, 1879
- Helicoverpa Hardwick, 1965
- Heliocheilus Grote, 1865
- Heliolonche Grote, 1873
- Heliothis Ochsenheimer, 1816
- Heliothodes Hampson, 1910
- Melaporphyria Grote, 1874
- Micriantha Hampson, 1908
- Microhelia Hampson, 1910
- Periphanes Hübner, 1821
- Protadisura Matthews, 1991
- Psectrotarsia Dognin, 1907
- Pyrocleptria Hampson, 1903
- Pyrrhia Hübner, 1821
- Rhodoecia Hampson, 1910
- Schinia Hübner, 1818
- Stenoecia Warren, 1911
- Timora Walker, 1856

== Selected former genera ==
- Erythroecia Hampson, 1910
- Masalia Moore, 1881 (now included in Heliocheilus)
- Thyreion Smith, 1891
