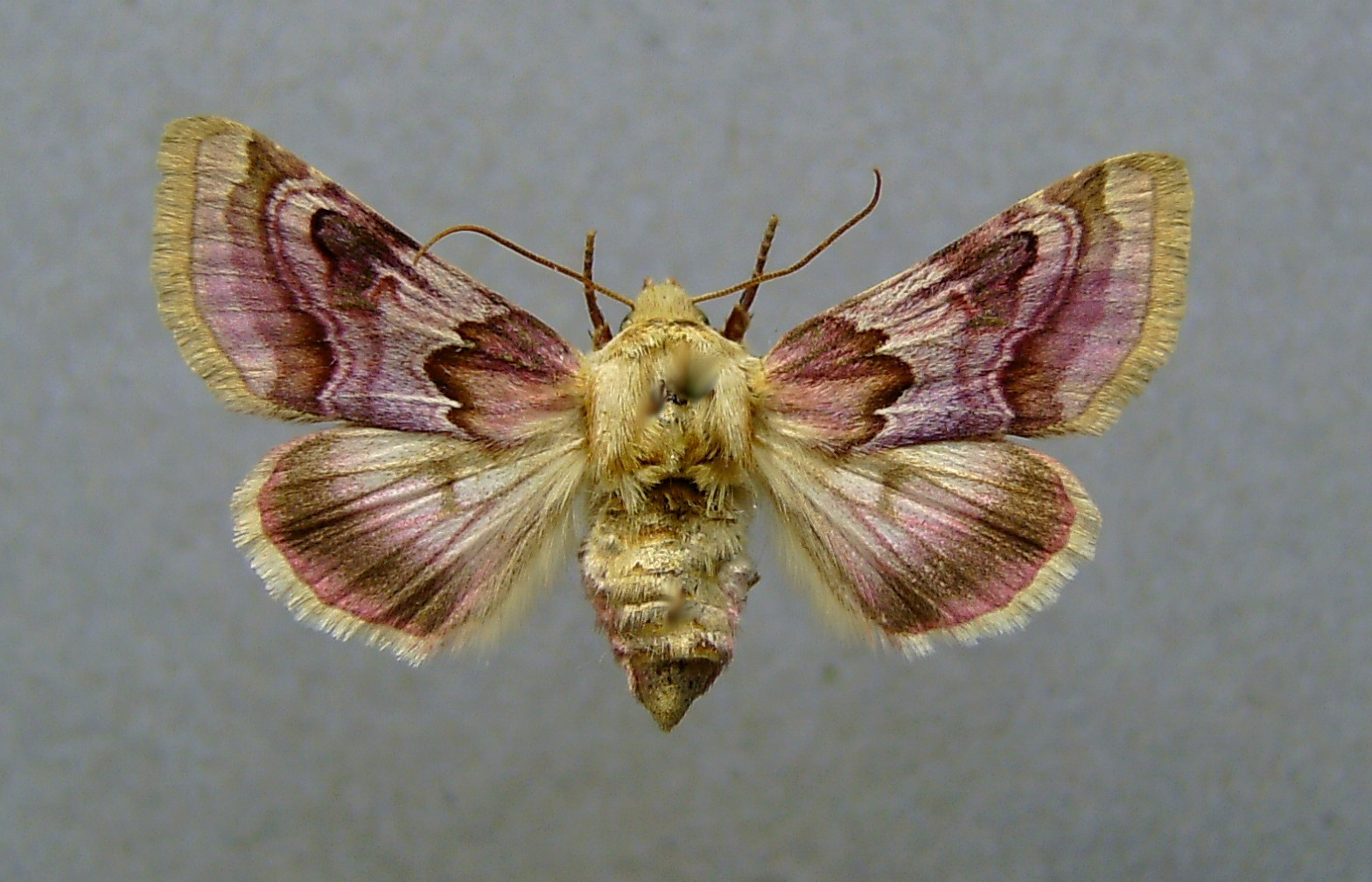

Scientific classification
- Kingdom: Animalia
- Phylum: Arthropoda
- Clade: Pancrustacea
- Class: Insecta
- Order: Lepidoptera
- Superfamily: Noctuoidea
- Family: Noctuidae
- Subfamily: Heliothinae
- Genus: Periphanes; Hübner, 1821
- Species: P. delphinii

Binomial name
- Periphanes delphinii (Linnaeus, 1758)

Synonyms
- Chariclea

= Periphanes =

Genus of moths

Periphanes is a monotypic genus of moth in the family Noctuidae first described by Jacob Hübner in 1821. Its only species, Periphanes delphinii, the pease blossom, was first described by Carl Linnaeus in his 1758 10th edition of Systema Naturae. It can be found from Afghanistan and the steppe areas of Central Asia and Anatolia up to the area surrounding the Mediterranean Sea and north-western Africa.

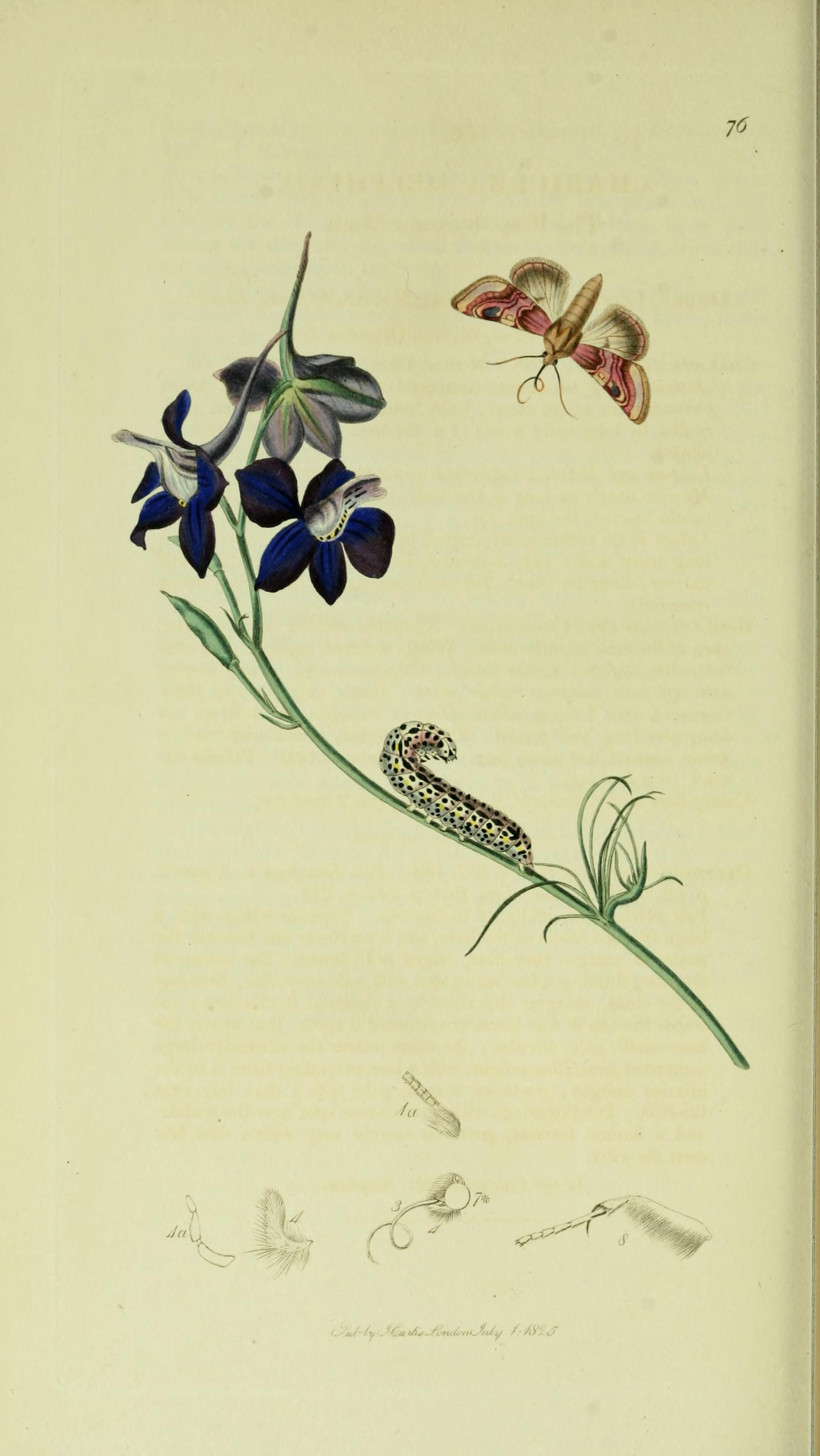
Illustration from John Curtis's British Entomology Volume 5

== Description ==
Pair of spines on tibia stout and more crooked, where the inner very long. Mid and hind tibia spineless. Forewings with more or less acute apex.

== Technical description and variation ==
Chariclea delphinii L. (501). Male forewing purplish pink, paler along outer margin and fringe, deepest in basal area and beyond middle; basal area edged by a pale and pink trilobed line; orbicular stigma ochreous, obscure; reniform large, irregular, edged with brownish purple, attached to the median shade, which with the double postmedian line and space beyond forms an irregular darker band; hindwing dirty ochreous, with fuscous veins and border, the extreme margin pink. Female darker, with a grey suffusion over both wings. — the form darollesi Oberth. (50 .) found in Algeria, Armenia, and W. Turkestan is much paler. — Larva violet grey; dorsal line black edged with yellow; sublateral bands broadly yellow; thoracic plate black, anal plate yellow; the whole body studded with black tubercles. The wingspan is 30–36 millimetres (1.2–1.4 in).

== Biology ==
The moths fly from May to June.

The larvae primarily feed on Delphinium consolida and Aconitum napellus.
