= Heliothis albida =

Scientific classification
- Kingdom: Animalia
- Phylum: Arthropoda
- Class: Insecta
- Order: Lepidoptera
- Superfamily: Noctuoidea
- Family: Noctuidae
- Genus: Heliothis
- Species: H. albida

Binomial name
- Heliothis albida (Hampson, 1905)

Synonyms
- Timora albida Hampson, 1905; Masalia albida (Hampson, 1905)

Species of moth

Heliothis albida is a moth of the family Noctuidae. It is found in North Africa, the Arabian Peninsula, the Levant (recorded only from Jordan and Israel) and the deserts of Iran.

Adults are on wing in April. There is one generation per year.
