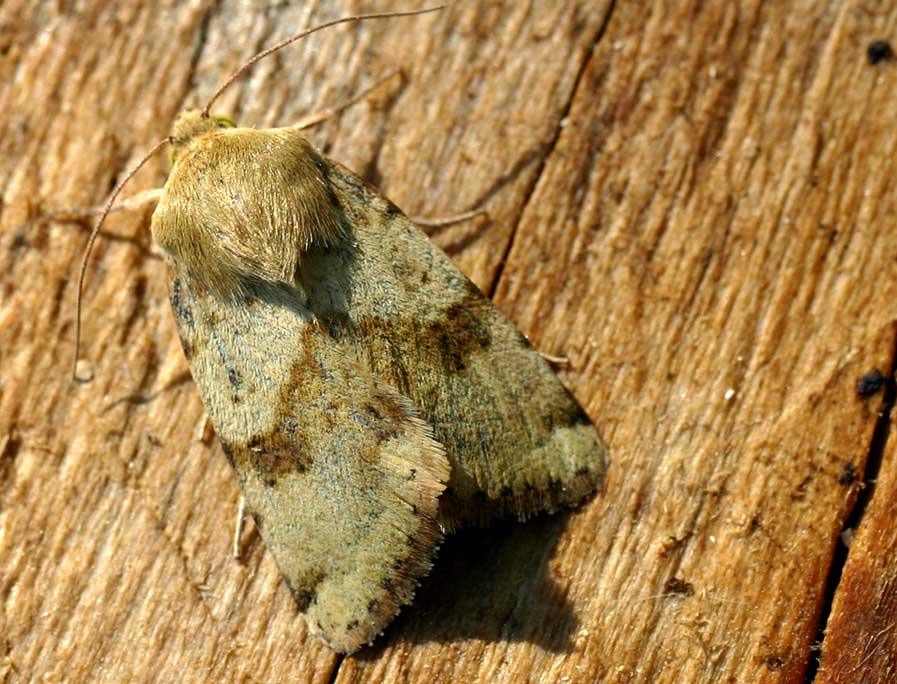

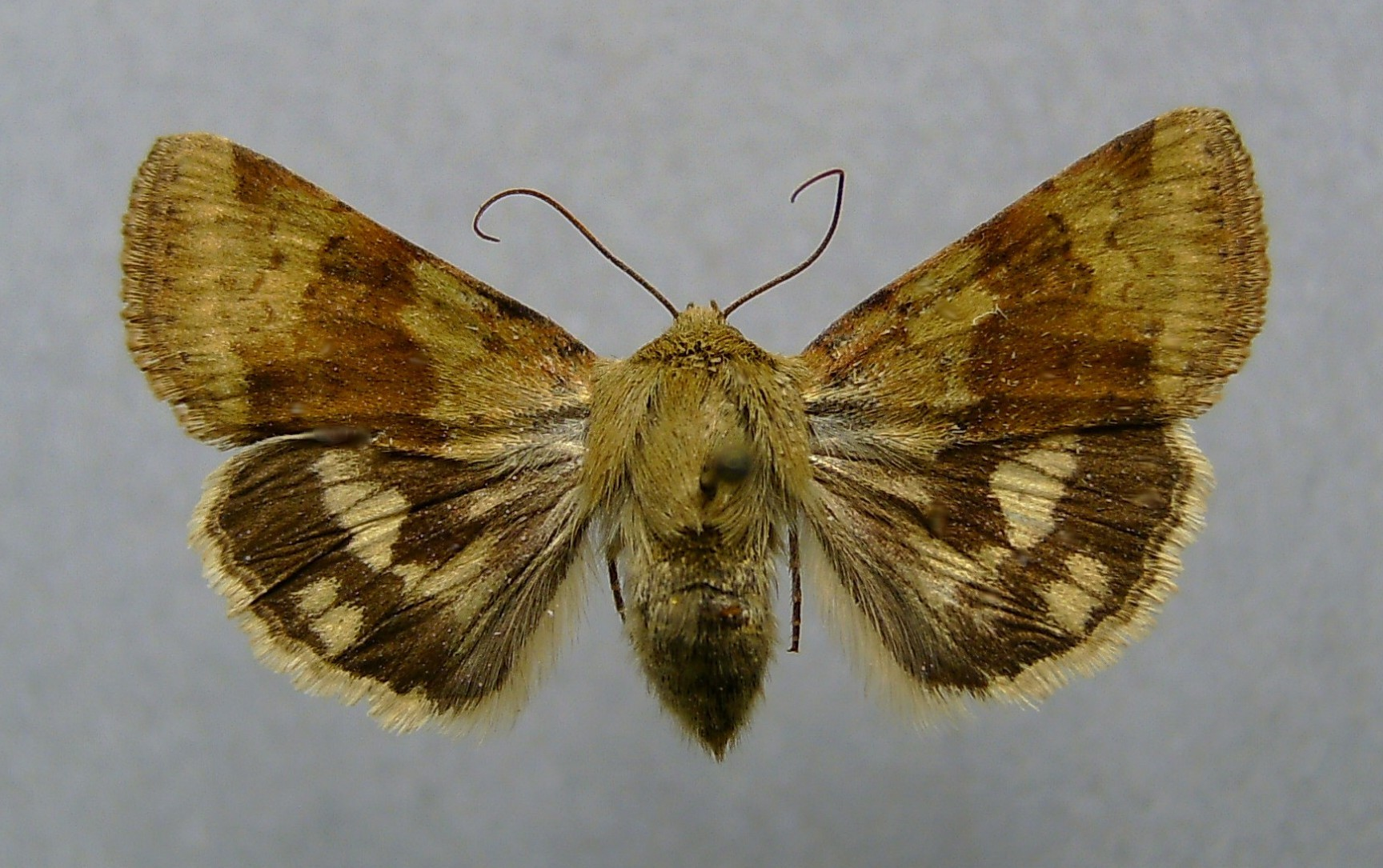

Scientific classification
- Kingdom: Animalia
- Phylum: Arthropoda
- Clade: Pancrustacea
- Class: Insecta
- Order: Lepidoptera
- Superfamily: Noctuoidea
- Family: Noctuidae
- Genus: Heliothis
- Species: H. viriplaca

Binomial name
- Heliothis viriplaca (Hufnagel, 1766)

Synonyms
- Heliothis dipsacea (Linnaeus, 1767)

= Heliothis viriplaca =

Species of moth

Heliothis viriplaca, the marbled clover, is a moth of the family Noctuoidea. It is found in Europe and across the Palearctic to Central Asia then to Japan, Korea and Sakhalin. In the south, it penetrates to Kashmir and Myanmar. As a migratory moth, it also reaches areas in northern Fennoscandia in some years. North of the Alps, both indigenous and immigrant individuals occur in certain areas. The heat-loving species occurs mainly on dry grasslands, fallow land, heathlands and sunny slopes and slopes and the edges of sand and gravel pits.

The wingspan is 25–30 mm. Meyrick describes it thus- Forewings greyish-ochreous, slightly greenish -tinged, paler before and beyond reniform; first and second lines indistinct; median shade rather dark fuscous, confluent with large dark fuscous reniform; subterminal line rather paler, preceded by a darker or fuscous fascia, darkest at extremities. Hindwings ochreous-whitish, towards base suffused with blackish; a large discal spot, and terminal band including an ochreous-whitish spot blackish. Larva green to purplish-brown; dorsal line darker-edged; subdorsal whitish, dark-edged beneath; spiracular green or yellowish; subspiracular white; head green, pink, or yellowish, brown -speckled.

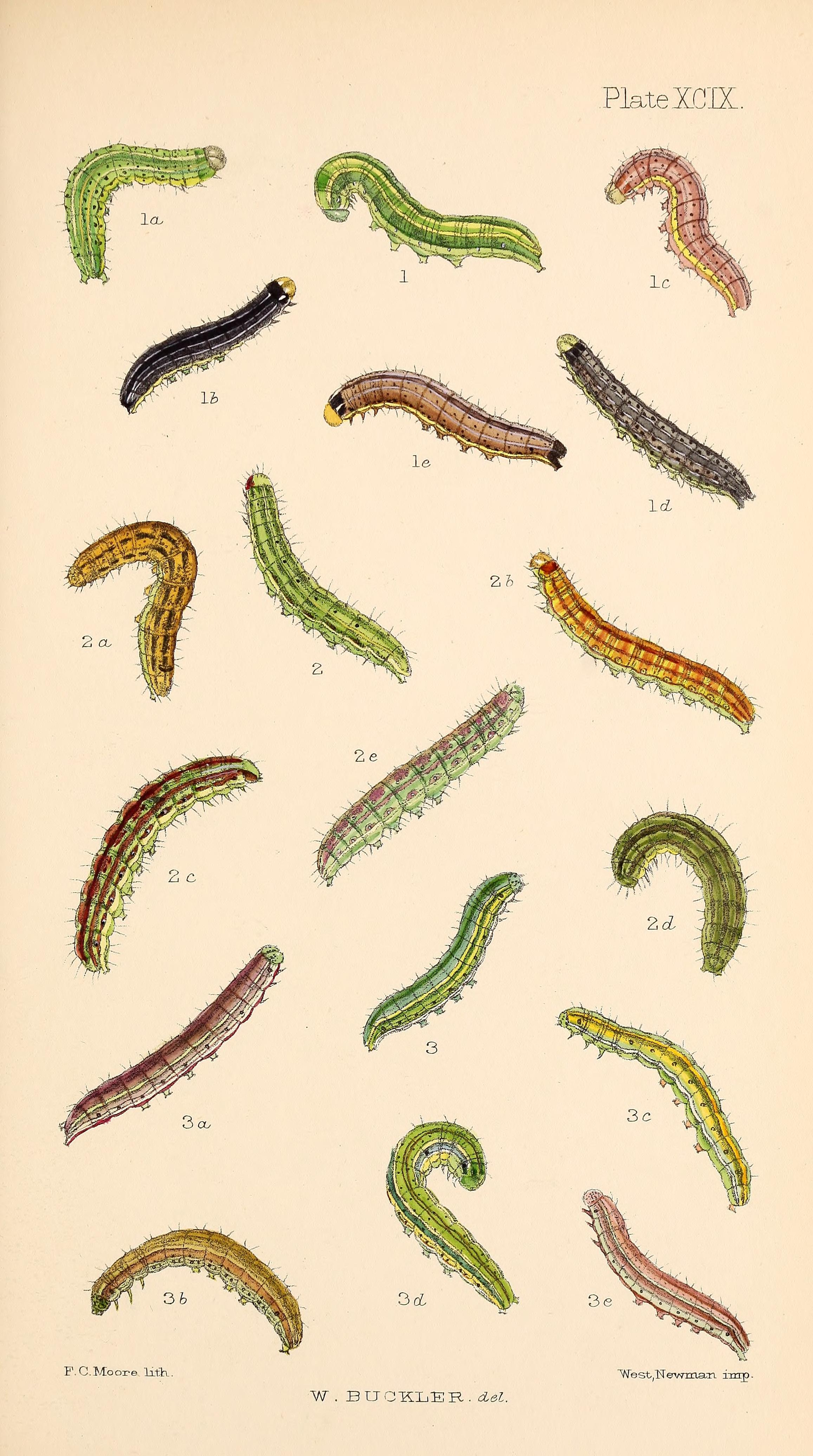
larvae in various stages

The moth flies in two to three generations from May to August..

The larvae feed on species from the genera Crepis, Trifolium, Silene, Ononis and Centaurea.

== Notes ==
1. The flight season refers to Belgium and the Netherlands. This may vary in other parts of the range.
