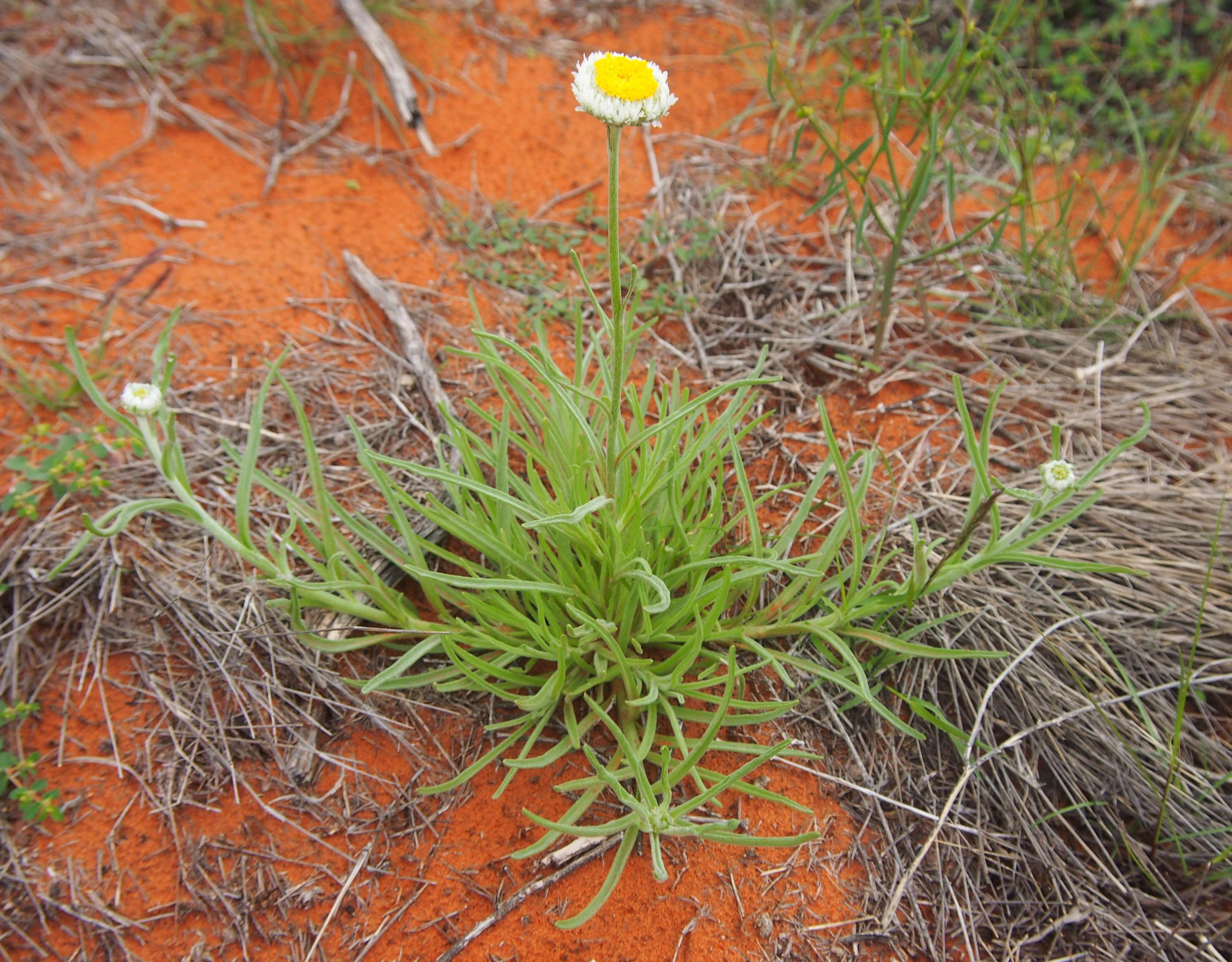

Scientific classification
- Kingdom: Plantae
- Clade: Embryophytes
- Clade: Tracheophytes
- Clade: Angiosperms
- Clade: Eudicots
- Clade: Asterids
- Order: Asterales
- Family: Asteraceae
- Subfamily: Asteroideae
- Tribe: Gnaphalieae
- Genus: Polycalymma; F.Muell. & Sond.
- Species: P. stuartii

Binomial name
- Polycalymma stuartii F.Muell. & Sond.

Synonyms
- Myriocephalus stuartii (F.Muell. & Sond. ex F.Muell. & Sond.) Benth.

= Polycalymma =

Genus of plants

Polycalymma stuartii, the poached egg daisy, is an Australian daisy found abundantly on sand plains and dunefields. Its common name is derived from the poached egg-like appearance of its white flower and yellow centre. It is the only known species of the genus Polycalymma; a member of the tribe Gnaphalieae within the family Asteraceae.

== Origin ==
The poached egg daisy was named after McDouall Stuart and is Indigenous to a large area of Central Australia. The first scientific description was written in 1853.

== Alternative names ==
- ham and eggs daisy
- fried egg plant
- bachelors' buttons

== Habitat ==
The poached egg daisy is found abundantly during good seasons in open communities on sand plans and dune fields in Western Australia, Northern Territory, South Australia, Queensland, New South Wales and Victoria. This annual daisy thrives in light to medium soil, open sunny communities and is resistant to drought and frost.

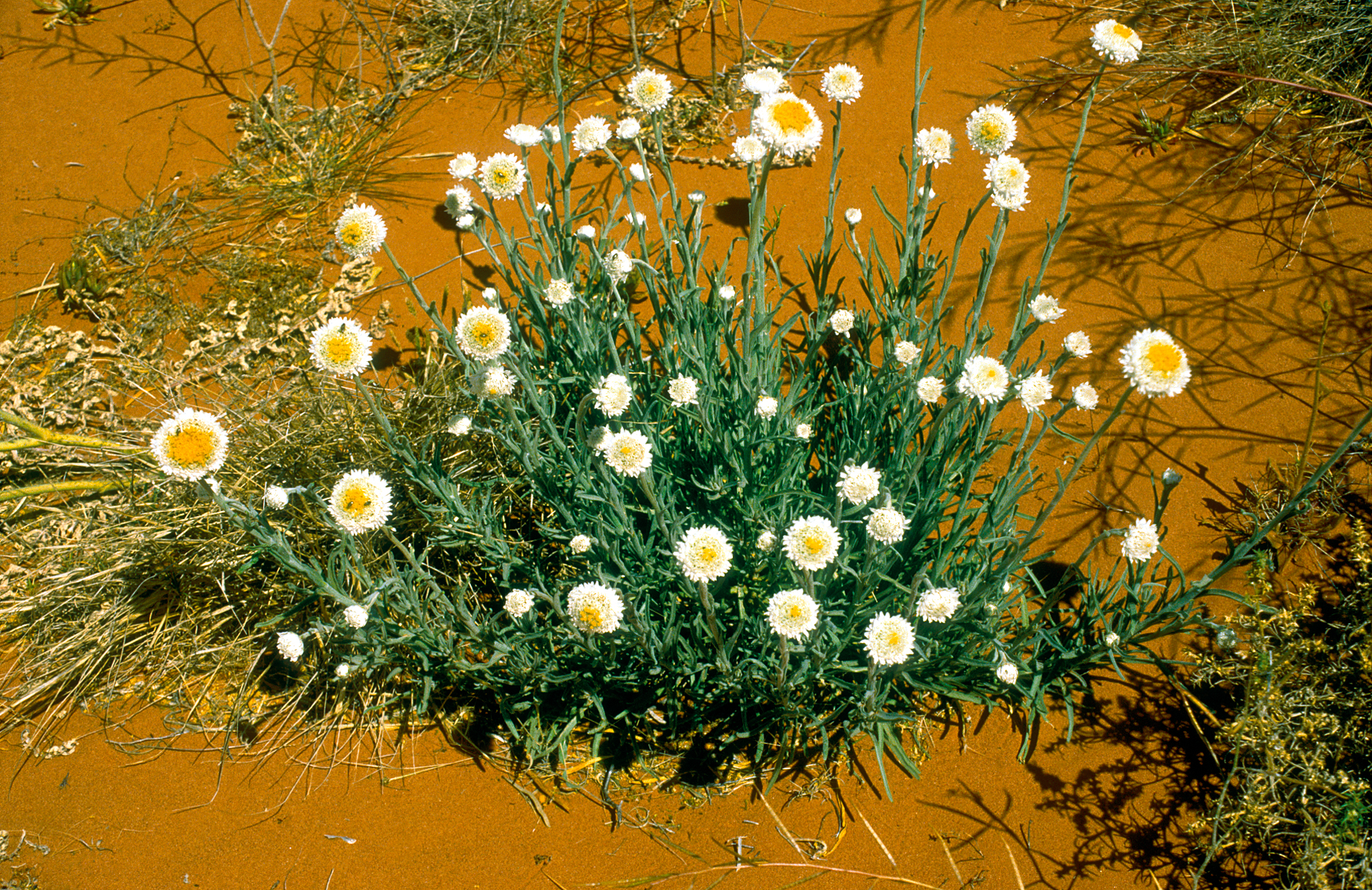
Poached Egg daises

== Description ==
=== Cotyledons ===
Two (dicot) narrow lance shaped cotyledon with a tapered base, pointed tips, edges that convex to parallel and a hairless surface.

=== First leaves ===
Narrow lance shaped first leaves with pointed tips and covered in dense short hair.

=== Leaves ===
Alternating leaves with no petiole. leaves are a light green colour, measure 20-70mm long with narrow parallel sides to lance shape with pointed tip, present woolly hairs on upper side and sticky hairs on underside and have smooth edges.

=== Stems ===
Stem is erect and stout, standing 100-500mm tall, somewhat tufted ad is woolly or very sticky with glandular hairs.

=== Flower head ===
Flower heads are compound, hemispherical and white with a yellow centre resembling a poached egg and measure 20-40mm in diameter.

=== Flowers ===
Flowers are tubular, bisexual and yellow with white 5-7mm long petals.

=== Fruit ===
Black cylindrical achene that are woolly or silky with long white hairs.

=== Roots ===
Taproot system.

== Ecology ==
8 week lifecycle
