= Chloridea metachrisea =

Timora metachrisea

Scientific classification
- Kingdom: Animalia
- Phylum: Arthropoda
- Class: Insecta
- Order: Lepidoptera
- Superfamily: Noctuoidea
- Family: Noctuidae
- Genus: Timora
- Species: T. metachrisea

Binomial name
- Timora metachrisea (Hampson, 1903)

Synonyms
- Chloridea metachrisea; Heliothis metachrisea; Heliocheilus metachrisea (Hampson, 1903)

Species of moth

Timora metachrisea is a species of moth of the family Noctuidae. It is found on Madagascar.
