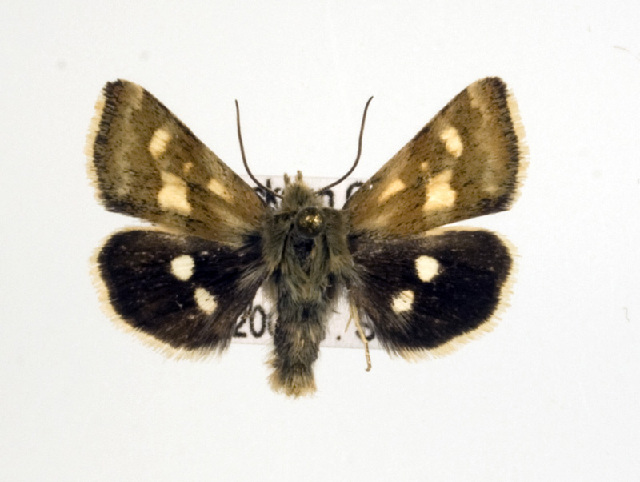

Scientific classification
- Kingdom: Animalia
- Phylum: Arthropoda
- Class: Insecta
- Order: Lepidoptera
- Superfamily: Noctuoidea
- Family: Noctuidae
- Genus: Heliothodes
- Species: H. diminutivus

Binomial name
- Heliothodes diminutivus (Grote, 1873)

Synonyms
- Heliothis diminutivus Grote, 1873; Heliothodes suffusana Strand, 1912; Heliothodes macromacula Strand, 1912; Heliothodes bifida Strand, 1912; Heliothodes fasciatus (H. Edwards, 1875); Melicleptria fasciatus H. Edwards, 1875; Heliothodes sabulosa (Smith, 1908)

= Heliothodes diminutivus =

Species of moth

Heliothodes diminutivus, the small heliothodes moth, is a moth of the family Noctuidae. The species was first described by Augustus Radcliffe Grote in 1873. It is found in the western US from California, through Oregon to Washington.

The wingspan is 15–19 mm.
