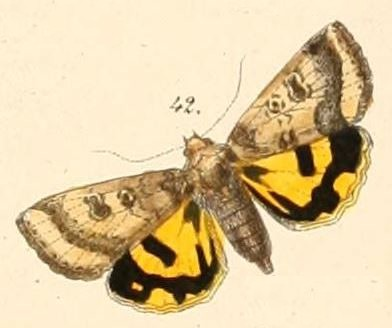

Scientific classification
- Domain: Eukaryota
- Kingdom: Animalia
- Phylum: Arthropoda
- Class: Insecta
- Order: Lepidoptera
- Superfamily: Noctuoidea
- Family: Noctuidae
- Genus: Heliothis
- Species: H. acesias

Binomial name
- Heliothis acesias Felder & Rogenhofer, 1872

Synonyms
- Heliothis luteitinctus Grote 1875

= Heliothis acesias =

Species of moth

Heliothis acesias is a species of moth of the family Noctuidae. It is found from north-eastern Nevada and southern Idaho, northward to southern Alberta, then eastward to southern and eastern Ontario. Adults are on from June to September.

It was previously considered to be Heliothis phloxiphaga. H. acesias has yellower and broader fore-wings than H. phloxiphaga.
