= Heliothis perstriata =

Scientific classification
- Kingdom: Animalia
- Phylum: Arthropoda
- Class: Insecta
- Order: Lepidoptera
- Superfamily: Noctuoidea
- Family: Noctuidae
- Genus: Heliothis
- Species: H. perstriata

Binomial name
- Heliothis perstriata (Hampson, 1903)

Synonyms
- Raghuva perstriata Hampson, 1903; Masalia perstriata (Hampson, 1903)

Species of moth

Heliothis perstriata is a species of moth of the family Noctuidae. It has been recorded from Iran and Punjab in India.

== Subspecies ==
- Heliothis perstriata perstriata
- Heliothis perstriata fuscostriata (Iran)
