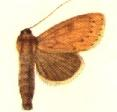
- Timora sinuata

Scientific classification
- Kingdom: Animalia
- Phylum: Arthropoda
- Class: Insecta
- Order: Lepidoptera
- Superfamily: Noctuoidea
- Family: Noctuidae
- Subfamily: Heliothinae
- Genus: Timora; Walker, 1856

Synonyms
- Dorika Moore, 1881; Sophaga Moore, 1881

= Timora =

Genus of moths

Timora is a genus of moths of the family Noctuidae. Some authors consider it to be a subgenus of Heliothis.

== Species ==
- Timora adamsoni Pinhey, 1956
- Timora albisticta Janse, 1917
- Timora bivittata Walker, 1856
- Timora crofti Pinhey, 1956
- Timora daphoena Hampson, 1910
- Timora diarhoda Hampson, 1909
- Timora feildi Erschoff, 1874
- Timora ignea Hampson, 1891
- Timora margarita Le Cerf, 1911
- Timora metachrisea Hampson, 1903
- Timora pauliani Viette, 1961
- Timora perrosea de Joannis, 1910
- Timora senegalensis Guenée, 1852
- Timora showaki Pinhey, 1956
- Timora sinuata Moore, 1881
- Timora turtur Berio, 1939
- Timora umbrifascia Hampson, 1913
- Timora unifascia Bethune-Baker, 1911
- Timora uniformis Warren, 1913
- Timora zavattarii Berio, 1944
