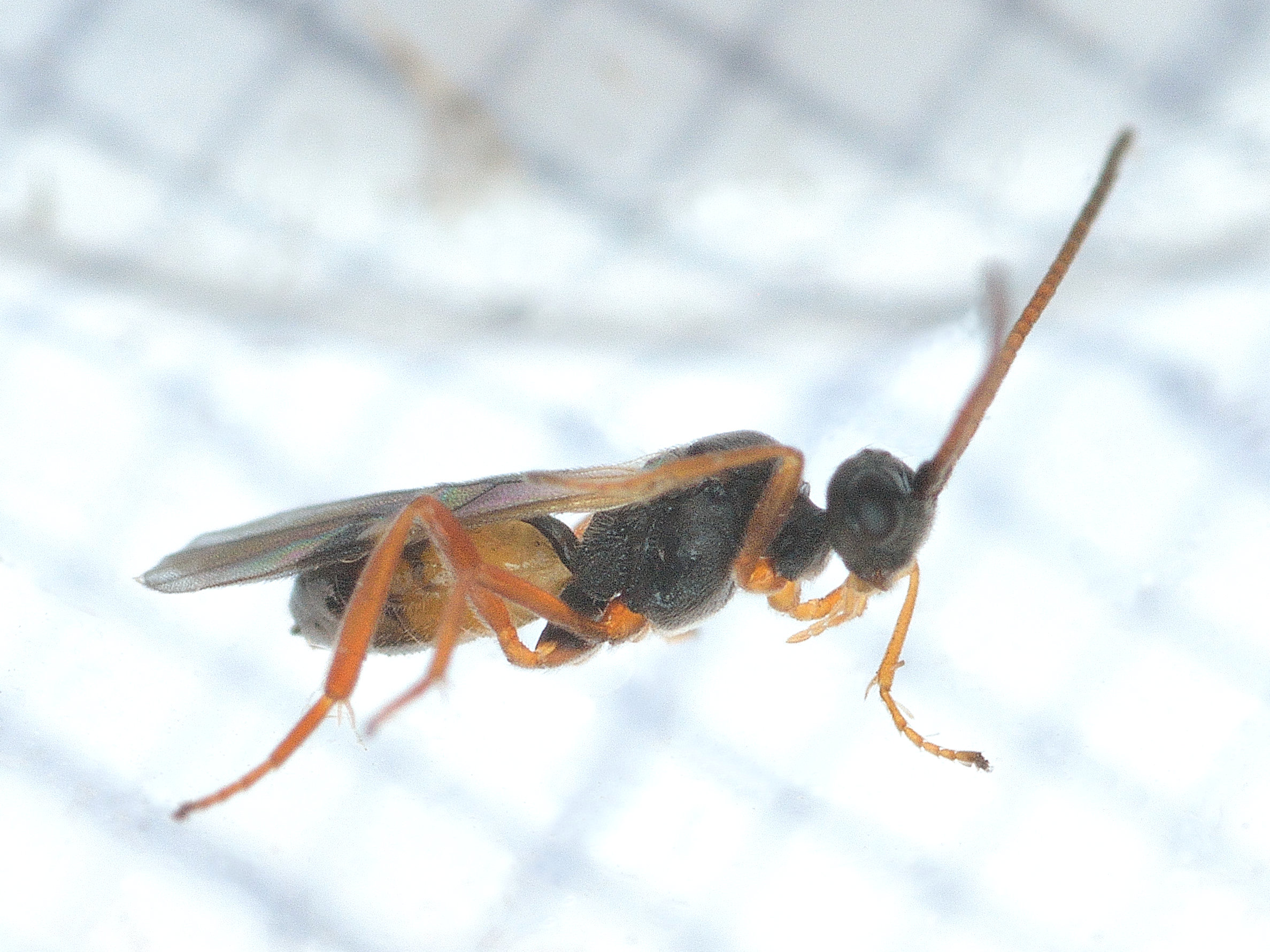

Scientific classification
- Domain: Eukaryota
- Kingdom: Animalia
- Phylum: Arthropoda
- Class: Insecta
- Order: Hymenoptera
- Family: Braconidae
- Genus: Microplitis
- Species: M. mandibularis

Binomial name
- Microplitis mandibularis (Thomson, 1895)

= Microplitis mandibularis =

Species of wasp

Microplitis mandibularis (Thomson 1985) (formerly Microgaster mandibularis Thomson, 1895) is a gregarious parasitoid wasp in the family Braconidae (Hymenoptera).

Several eggs are laid in lepidopteran larvae and erupt to spin their cocoons when the caterpillar is in the final instar. Hosts are moths of the family Noctuidae. Those reported by Güçlü & Özbek include: Conistra vaccinii, Jodia croceago, Lithophane ornitopus, Noctua fimbriata, Xanthia ocellaris, with additional records of host species Lasionycta proxima, and Xylena vetusta.

van Achterberg gives a key for identification of Braconidae from Greenland that includes a description of M. mandibularis, which can be distinguished from related species by its colouration.

Fernandez-Triana et al. report M. mandibularis from: Greenland, Armenia, Azerbaijan, Croatia, Finland, Georgia, Germany, Hungary, Macedonia, Mongolia, Netherlands, Russia (PRI, SAK), Serbia, Slovakia, Spain, Sweden, Switzerland, Tunisia, Turkey, United Kingdom. It has additionally been recorded from Romania, Iran, and from Belgium and the Czech Republic.

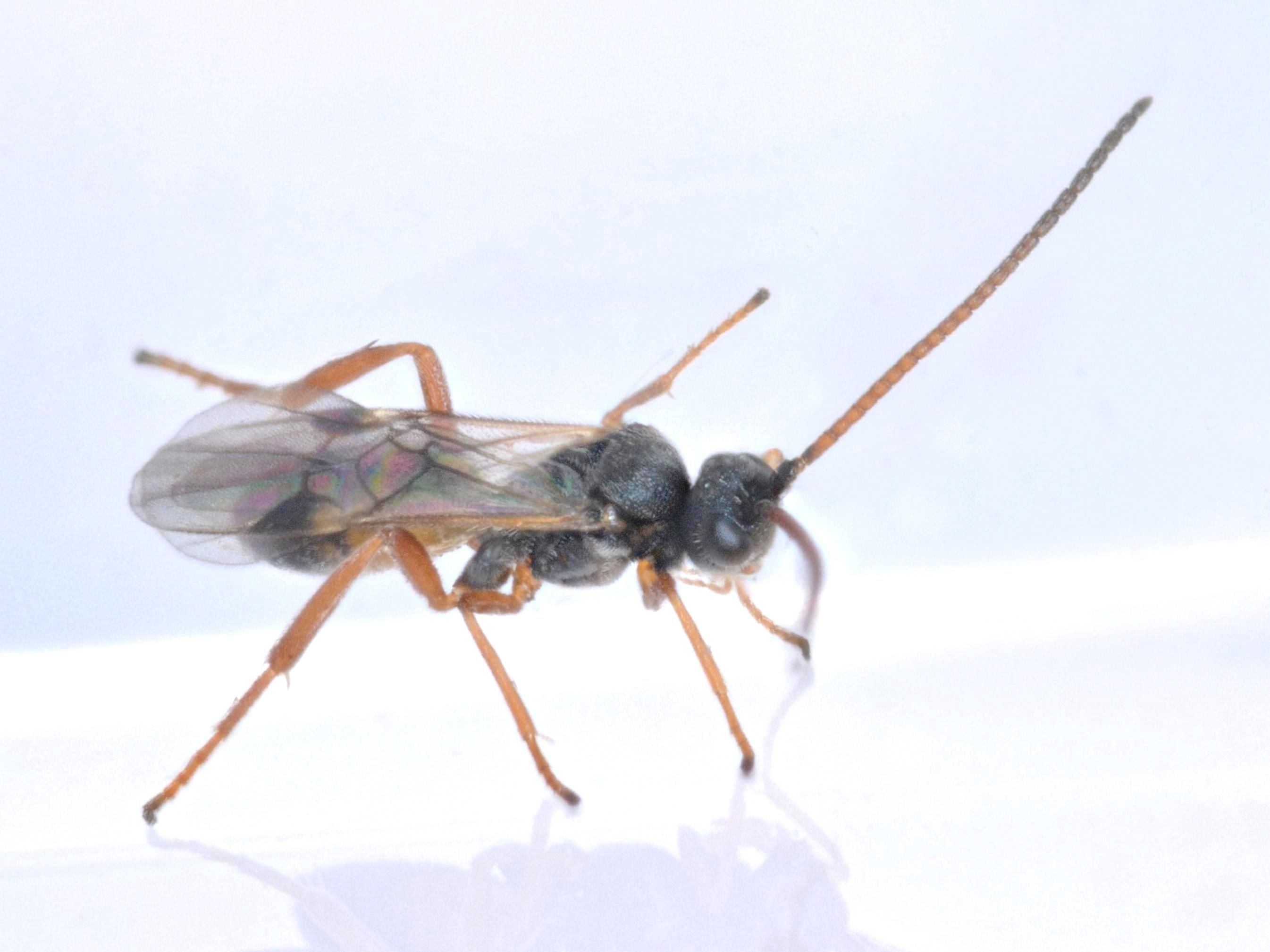
Microplitis mandibularis

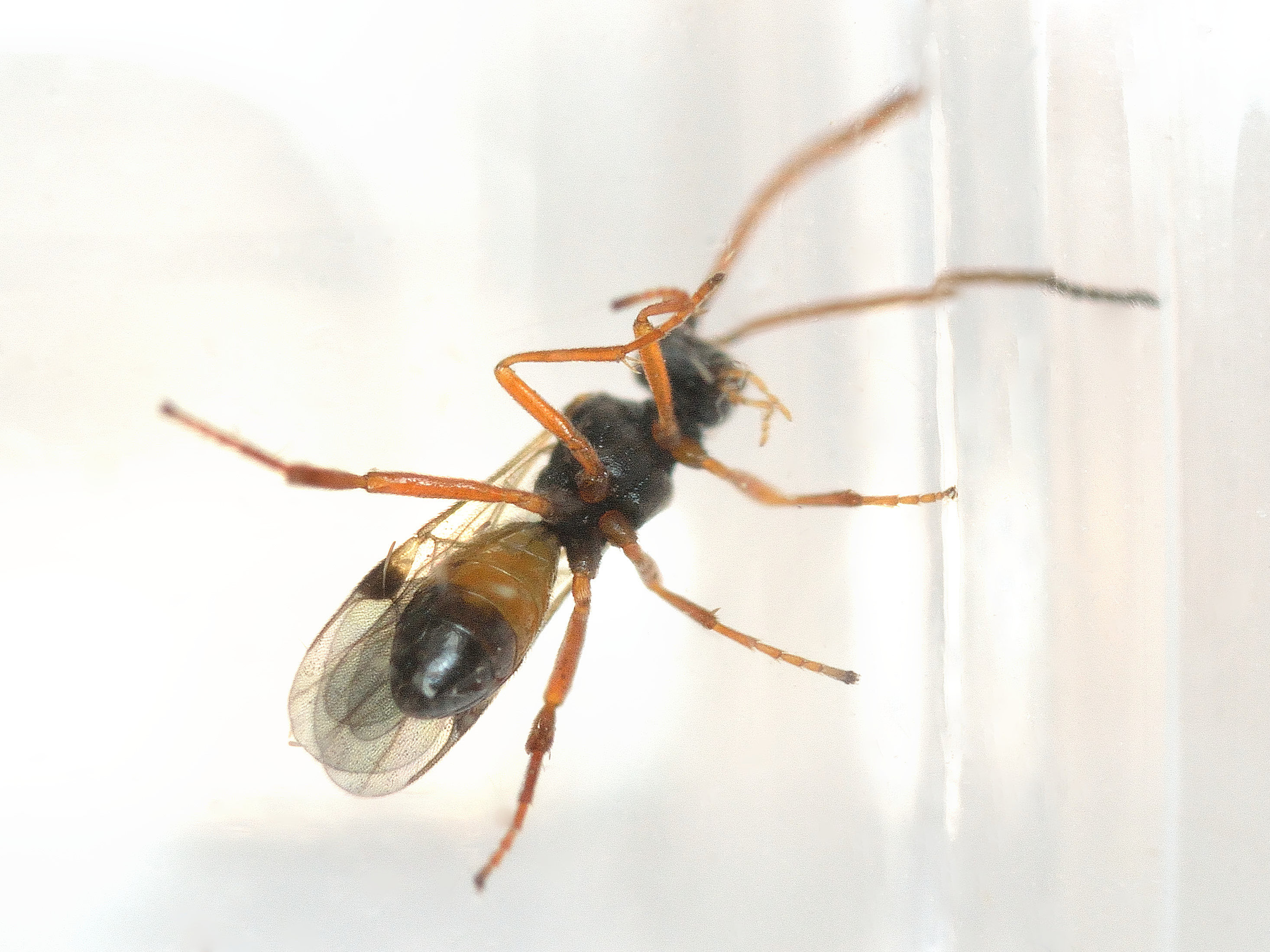
Microplitis mandibularis

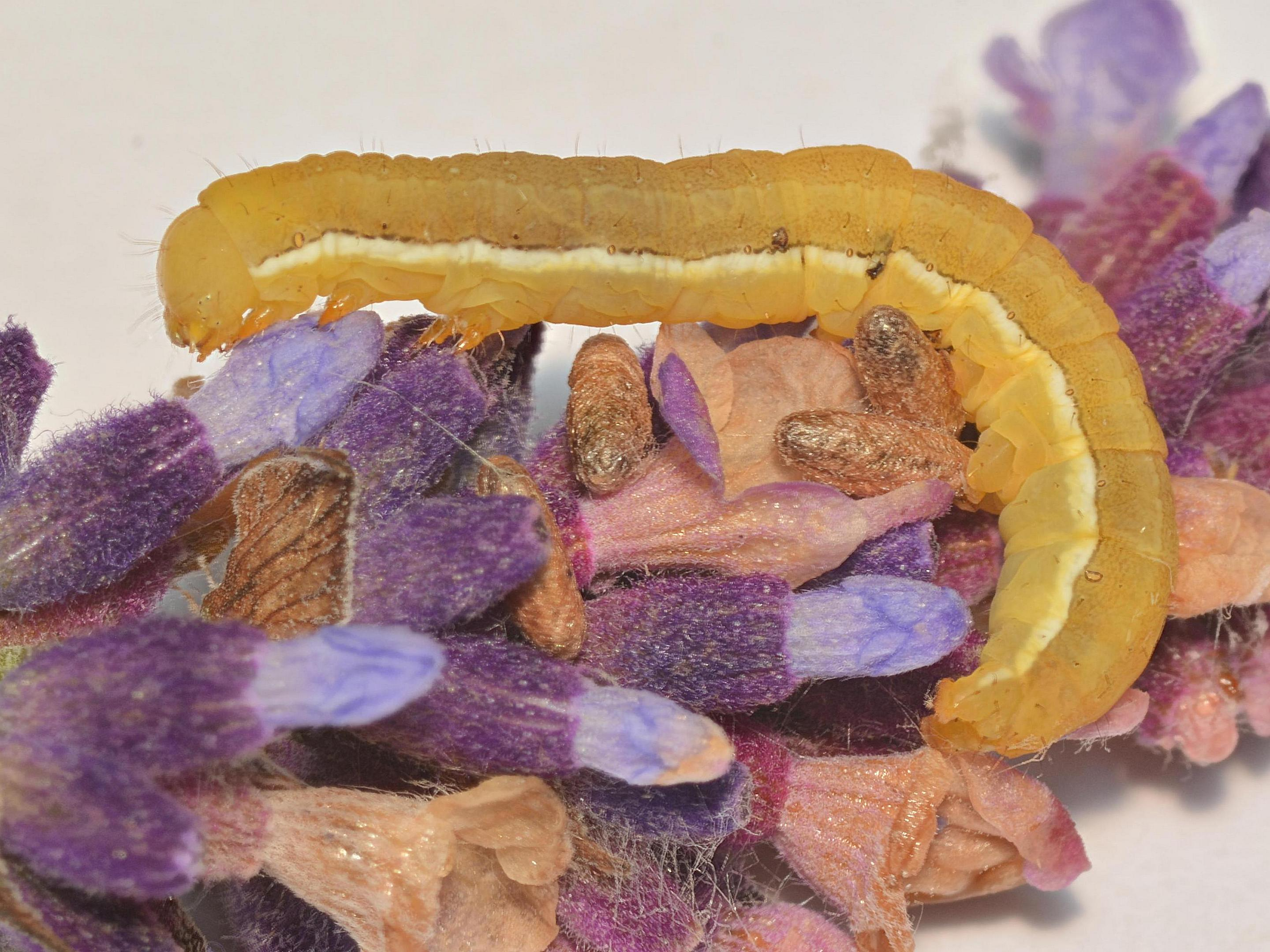
Cocoons of Microplitis mandibularis shortly after emerging from the larva of the Xylena vetusta (Red Sword-grass moth)

== See also ==
- List of Microplitis species
