= List of Microplitis species =

These 195 species belong to the genus Microplitis, braconid wasps.

== Microplitis species ==
- Microplitis abrs Austin & Dangerfield, 1993
- Microplitis adelaidensis Austin & Dangerfield, 1993
- Microplitis adisurae (Subba Rao & Sharma, 1960)
- Microplitis adrianguadamuzi Fernandez-Triana & Whitfield, 2015
- Microplitis aduncus (Ruthe, 1860)
- Microplitis ajmerensis Rao & Kurian, 1950
- Microplitis alajensis Telenga, 1955
- Microplitis alaskensis Ashmead, 1902
- Microplitis albipennis Abdinbekova, 1969
- Microplitis albotibialis Telenga, 1955
- Microplitis alexanderrojasi Fernandez-Triana & Whitfield, 2015
- Microplitis altissimus Fernandez-Triana, 2018
- Microplitis amplitergius Xu & He, 2002
- Microplitis aprilae Austin & Dangerfield, 1993
- Microplitis areyongensis Austin & Dangerfield, 1993
- Microplitis ariatus Papp, 1979
- Microplitis atamiensis Ashmead, 1906
- Microplitis autographae Muesebeck, 1922
- Microplitis bamagensis Austin & Dangerfield, 1993
- Microplitis basalis (Bingham, 1906)
- Microplitis basipallescentis Song & Chen, 2008
- Microplitis beyarslani Inanç, 2002
- Microplitis bicoloratus Xu & He, 2003
- Microplitis blascoi Papp & Shaw, 2001
- Microplitis bomiensis Zhang, 2019
- Microplitis borealis Xu & He, 2000
- Microplitis bradleyi Muesebeck, 1922
- Microplitis brassicae Muesebeck, 1922
- Microplitis brevispina Song & Chen, 2008
- Microplitis capeki Nixon, 1970
- Microplitis carinatus Song & Chen, 2008
- Microplitis carinicollis (Cameron, 1905)
- Microplitis carteri Walley, 1932
- Microplitis cebes Nixon, 1970
- Microplitis ceratomiae Riley, 1881
- Microplitis chacoensis (Cameron, 1908)
- Microplitis changbaishanus Song & Chen, 2008
- Microplitis chivensis Telenga, 1955
- Microplitis choui Xu & He, 2000
- Microplitis chrysostigma Tobias, 1964
- Microplitis chui Xu & He, 2002
- Microplitis coactus (Lundbeck, 1896)
- Microplitis combinatus (Papp, 1984)
- Microplitis confusus Muesebeck, 1922
- Microplitis crassiantenna Song & Chen, 2008
- Microplitis crassifemoralis Alexeev, 1971
- Microplitis crenulatus (Provancher, 1888)
- Microplitis croceipes (Cresson, 1872)
- Microplitis cubitellanus Xu & He, 2000
- Microplitis daitojimensis Sonan, 1940
- Microplitis decens Tobias, 1964
- Microplitis decipiens Prell, 1925
- Microplitis demolitor Wilkinson, 1934
- Microplitis deprimator (Fabricius, 1798)
- Microplitis desertorum Telenga, 1955
- Microplitis desertus Alexeev, 1977
- Microplitis docilis Nixon, 1970
- Microplitis dornator (Papp, 1987)
- Microplitis eminius (Papp, 1987)
- Microplitis eremitus Reinhard, 1880
- Microplitis erythrogaster Abdinbekova, 1969
- Microplitis espinachi Walker, 2003
- Microplitis excisus Telenga, 1955
- Microplitis feltiae Muesebeck, 1922
- Microplitis figueresi Walker, 2003
- Microplitis flavipalpis (Brullé, 1832)
- Microplitis fordi Nixon, 1970
- Microplitis francopupulini Fernandez-Triana & Whitfield, 2015
- Microplitis fraudulentus (Papp, 1984)
- Microplitis fujianicus Song & Zhang, 2017
- Microplitis fulvicornis (Wesmael, 1837)
- Microplitis galinarius Kotenko, 2007
- Microplitis gerulus Papp, 1980
- Microplitis gidjus Austin & Dangerfield, 1993
- Microplitis glabrior Alexeev, 1971
- Microplitis gortynae Riley, 1881
- Microplitis goughi Austin & Dangerfield, 1993
- Microplitis hebertbakeri Fernandez-Triana & Whitfield, 2015
- Microplitis helicoverpae Xu & He, 2000
- Microplitis heterocerus (Ruthe, 1860)
- Microplitis hirtifacialis Song & You, 2008
- Microplitis hispalensis Marshall, 1898
- Microplitis hova Granger, 1949
- Microplitis hyalinipennis Alexeev, 1971
- Microplitis hyphantriae Ashmead, 1898
- Microplitis idia Nixon, 1970
- Microplitis impressus (Wesmael, 1837)
- Microplitis improvisus (Papp, 1984)
- Microplitis incurvatus Xu & He, 2002
- Microplitis indicus Marsh, 1978
- Microplitis infula (Kotenko, 1994)
- Microplitis jamesi Austin & Dangerfield, 1993
- Microplitis jiangsuensis Xu & He, 2000
- Microplitis jorgehernandezi Fernandez-Triana & Whitfield, 2015
- Microplitis jorgeluisi Fernandez-Triana, 2018
- Microplitis juanmanueli Fernandez-Triana, 2018
- Microplitis julioalbertoi Fernandez-Triana, 2018
- Microplitis karakurti Rossikov, 1904
- Microplitis kaszabi Papp, 1980
- Microplitis kewleyi Muesebeck, 1922
- Microplitis kurandensis Austin & Dangerfield, 1993
- Microplitis lacteus Austin & Dangerfield, 1993
- Microplitis laticinctus Muesebeck, 1922
- Microplitis latistigmus Muesebeck, 1922
- Microplitis leoniae Niezabitowski, 1910
- Microplitis leucaniae Xu & He, 2002
- Microplitis lineatus Austin & Dangerfield, 1993
- Microplitis longicaudus Muesebeck, 1922
- Microplitis longiradiusis Xu & He, 2003
- Microplitis longwangshanus Xu & He, 2000
- Microplitis lugubris (Ruthe, 1860)
- Microplitis lugubroides van Achterberg, 2006
- Microplitis mahunkai (Papp, 1979)
- Microplitis malimba (Papp, 1984)
- Microplitis mamestrae Weed, 1887
- Microplitis mandibularis (Thomson, 1895)
- Microplitis manilae Ashmead, 1904
- Microplitis mariamargaritae Fernandez-Triana, 2018
- Microplitis marini Whitfield, 2003
- Microplitis marshallii Kokujev, 1898
- Microplitis masneri Austin & Dangerfield, 1993
- Microplitis maturus Weed, 1888
- Microplitis mediator (Haliday, 1834)
- Microplitis melianae Viereck, 1911
- Microplitis mencianus Xu & He, 1999
- Microplitis mexicanus (Cameron, 1887)
- Microplitis minutus Alexeev, 1977
- Microplitis moestus (Ratzeburg, 1852)
- Microplitis mongolicus Papp, 1967
- Microplitis montanus Muesebeck, 1922
- Microplitis murkyi Gupta, 2013
- Microplitis murrayi Austin & Dangerfield, 1993
- Microplitis naenia Nixon, 1970
- Microplitis narendrani Ranjith & Nasser, 2015
- Microplitis necopinatus (Papp, 1984)
- Microplitis newguineaensis Austin & Dangerfield, 1993
- Microplitis nielseni Austin & Dangerfield, 1993
- Microplitis nigrifemur Xu & He, 2006
- Microplitis nigritus Muesebeck, 1922
- Microplitis obscuripennatus Xu & He, 1999
- Microplitis ocellatae (Bouché, 1834)
- Microplitis ochraceus Szépligeti, 1896
- Microplitis paizhensis Zhang, 2019
- Microplitis pallidipennis Tobias, 1964
- Microplitis pallidipes Szépligeti, 1902
- Microplitis pellucidus Telenga, 1955
- Microplitis pennatulae Ranjith & Nasser, 2015
- Microplitis perelegans (Bingham, 1906)
- Microplitis pipus Austin & Dangerfield, 1993
- Microplitis plutellae Muesebeck, 1922
- Microplitis prodeniae Rao & Kurian, 1950
- Microplitis pseudomurinus Abdinbekova, 1969
- Microplitis pseudoochraceus Alexeev, 1977
- Microplitis quadridentatus (Provancher, 1886)
- Microplitis quintilis Viereck, 1917
- Microplitis ratzeburgii (Ruthe, 1858)
- Microplitis retentus (Papp, 1984)
- Microplitis rufipes Dutu-Lacatusu, 1961
- Microplitis rufiventris Kokujev, 1914
- Microplitis schmidti Austin & Dangerfield, 1993
- Microplitis scrophulariae Szépligeti, 1898
- Microplitis scutellatus Muesebeck, 1922
- Microplitis semicircularis (Ratzeburg, 1844)
- Microplitis similis Lyle, 1921
- Microplitis sofron Nixon, 1970
- Microplitis sordipes (Ziegler, 1834)
- Microplitis spectabilis (Haliday, 1834)
- Microplitis spinolae (Nees, 1834)
- Microplitis spodopterae Rao & Kurian, 1950
- Microplitis steinbergi Tobias, 1964
- Microplitis stigmaticus (Ratzeburg, 1844)
- Microplitis storeyi Austin & Dangerfield, 1993
- Microplitis strenuus Reinhard, 1880
- Microplitis suavis Alexeev, 1971
- Microplitis subsulcatus Granger, 1949
- Microplitis tadzhicus Telenga, 1949
- Microplitis taptor (Papp, 1987)
- Microplitis tasmaniensis Austin & Dangerfield, 1993
- Microplitis taylori Austin & Dangerfield, 1993
- Microplitis teba (Kotenko, 1994)
- Microplitis testaceicornis Niezabitowski, 1910
- Microplitis tobiasi Kotenko, 2007
- Microplitis tristis (Nees, 1834)
- Microplitis tuberculatus (Bouché, 1834)
- Microplitis tuberculifer (Wesmael, 1837)
- Microplitis tunetensis Marshall, 1901
- Microplitis varicolor Viereck, 1917
- Microplitis varipes (Ruthe, 1860)
- Microplitis viduus (Ruthe, 1860)
- Microplitis vitobiasi Fernandez-Triana, 2019
- Microplitis xanthopus (Ruthe, 1860)
- Microplitis zhaoi Xu & He, 2000
- † Microplitis elegans Timon-David, 1944
- † Microplitis primordialis (Brues, 1906)
- † Microplitis vesperus Brues, 1910
