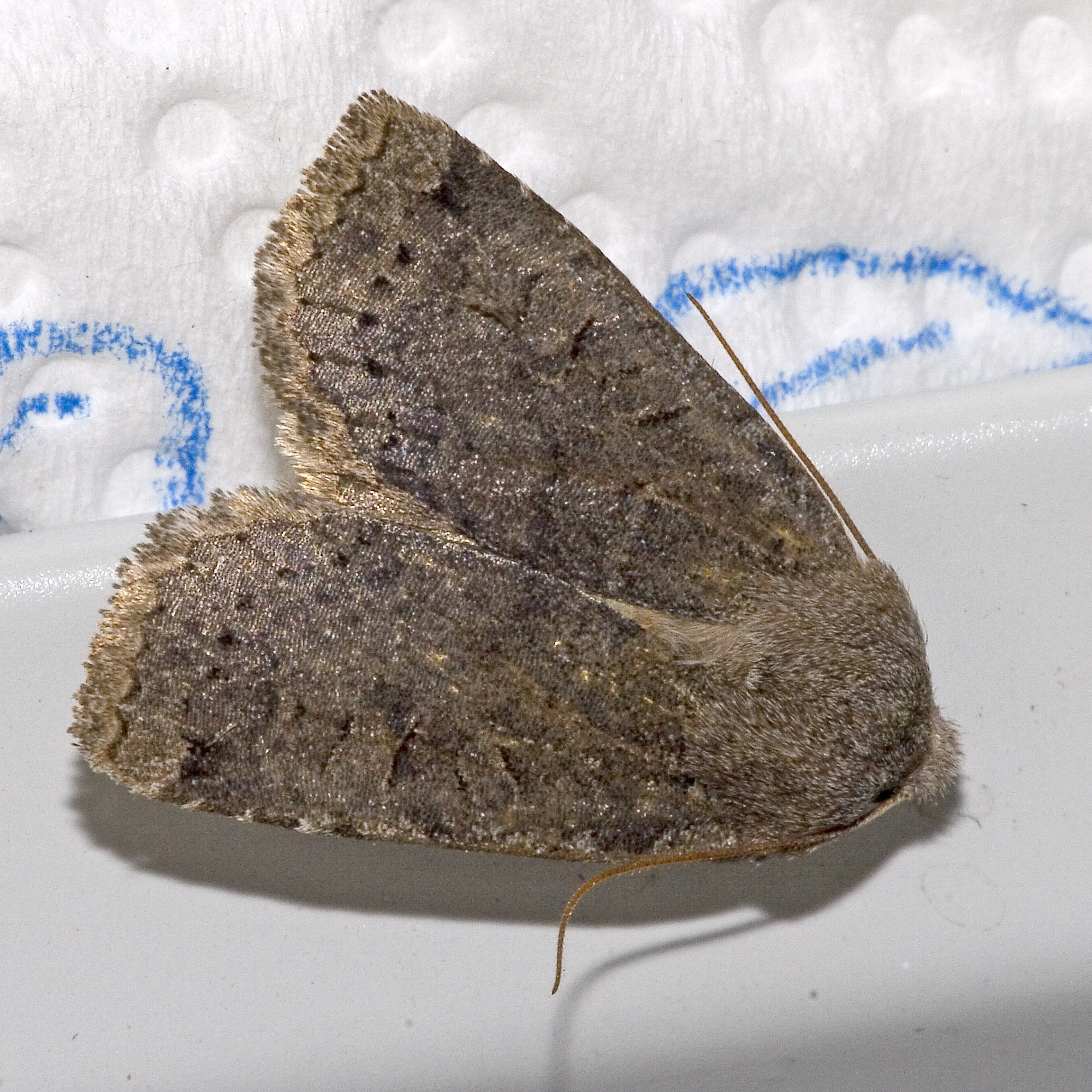

Scientific classification
- Domain: Eukaryota
- Kingdom: Animalia
- Phylum: Arthropoda
- Class: Insecta
- Order: Lepidoptera
- Superfamily: Noctuoidea
- Family: Noctuidae
- Genus: Conistra
- Species: C. ligula

Binomial name
- Conistra ligula (Esper, 1791)

Synonyms
- Phalaena (Noctua) ligula Esper, 1791; Phalaena (Noctua) ligula Esper, 1804; Noctua subnigra Haworth, 1809; Cerastis vaccinii var. brigensis Boisduval, 1840; Orrhodia jullieni Culot, 1913

= Conistra ligula =

Species of moth

Conistra ligula, the dark chestnut, is a moth of the family Noctuidae. The species was first described by Eugenius Johann Christoph Esper in 1791 and it is found in the Palearctic.

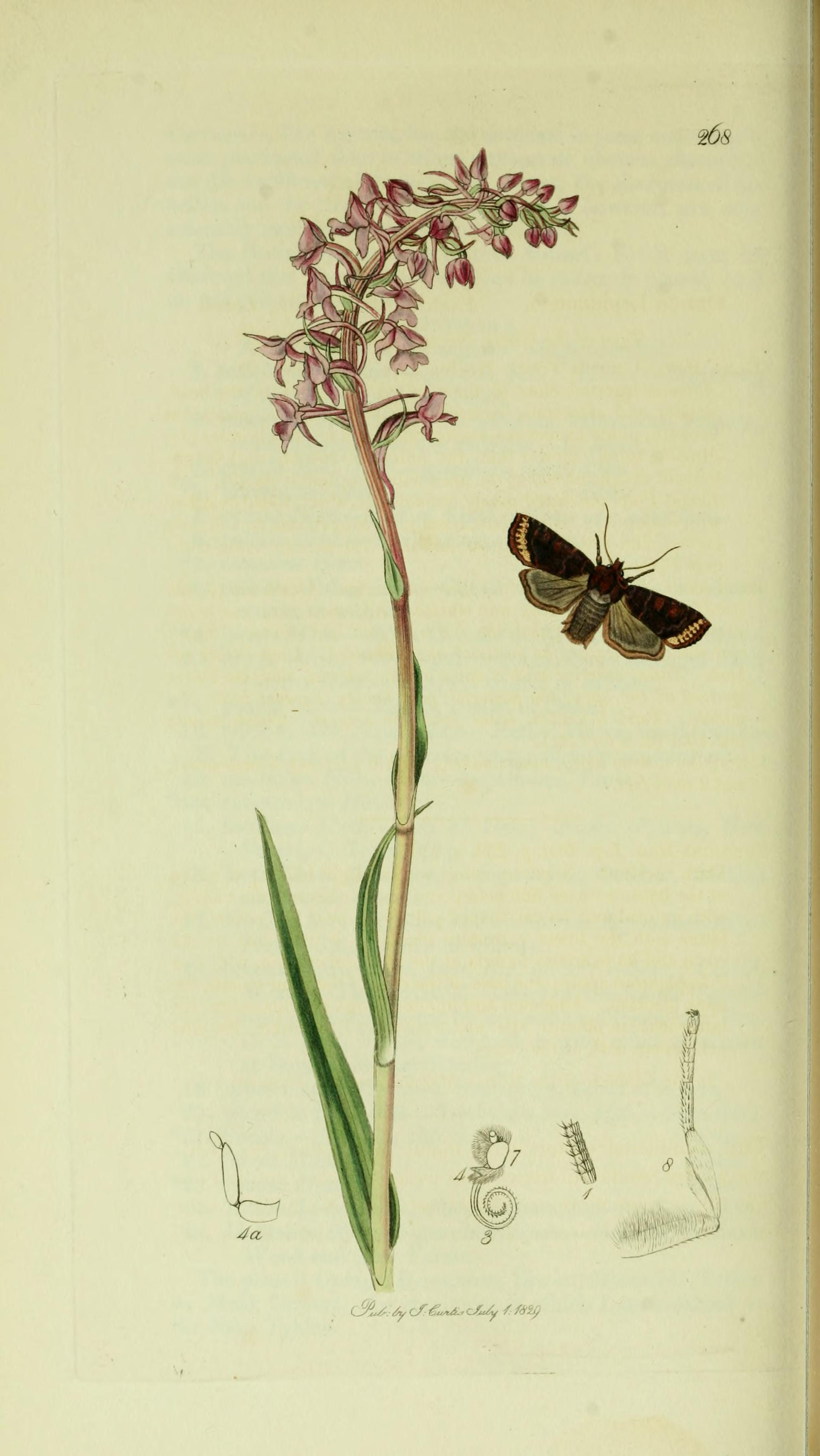
Illustration from John Curtis's British Entomology Volume 5

== Distribution ==
It is found in western, central and southern Europe. In western Europe, it is missing in many parts of Scotland and the western part of Ireland. In central Europe it is missing on the German North Sea coast, in Denmark, the entirety of Fennoscandia wooded, the northern Baltic countries and the central and northern Russia. The species also does not occur on many islands of the Mediterranean. In North Africa, it is found in Morocco. Further east, its range extends into northern Iraq, Turkey and Armenia.

== Description ==
The length of the forewings is 13–15 mm. "Forewing deep red brown or purplish brown, darker than vaccinii; a pale submarginal band, grey or brownish grey, on which stand the spots forming the submarginal line; the lines and edges of the stigmata, and often the veins pale; hindwing brownish fuscous." Differential characters: dark brown or red-brown base colour of the forewings. Pale subterminal fascia. brown fuscous hindwings.

== Biology ==
It overwinters partially as an egg and partially as imago. Mainly females overwinter as imago.

Larva yellowish brown; the lines pale, but obscure; spiracular line pinkish ochreous, dark edged above; spiracles black. The larvae feed on Salix, Quercus, Prunus spinosa and Crataegus. Later instars feed on various herbaceous plants, such as Rumex and Taraxacum officinale.

== Subspecies ==
- Conistra ligula ligula
- Conistra ligula gemella Rungs, 1972 (Morocco)
