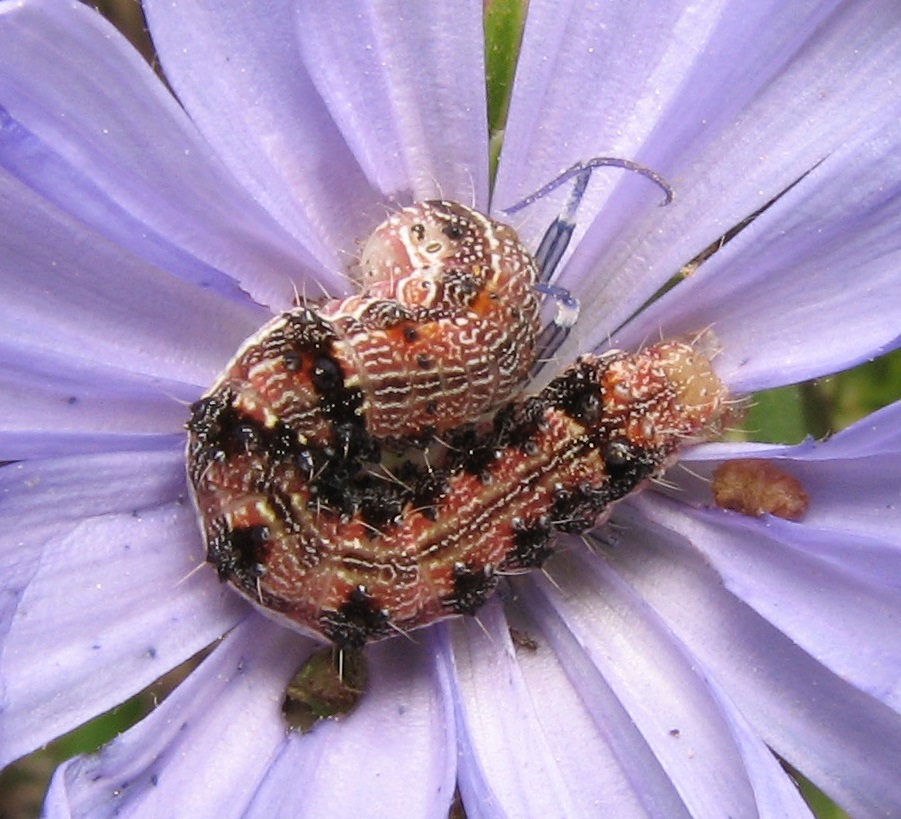
- Chloridea virescens larva

Scientific classification
- Kingdom: Animalia
- Phylum: Arthropoda
- Class: Insecta
- Order: Lepidoptera
- Superfamily: Noctuoidea
- Family: Noctuidae
- Subfamily: Heliothinae
- Genus: Chloridea; Duncan & Westwood, 1841

= Chloridea =

Genus of moths

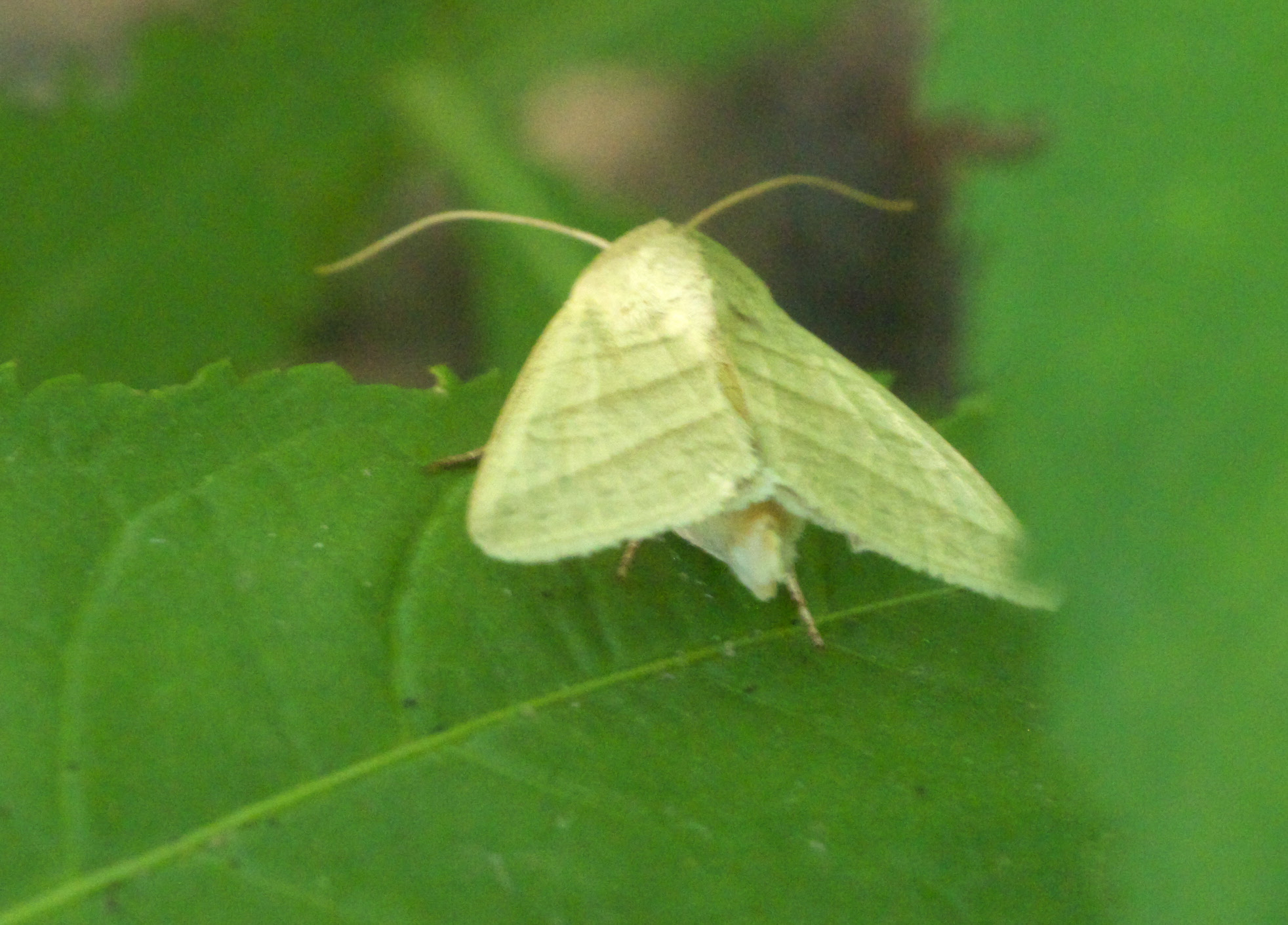
Chloridea subflexa

Chloridea is a genus of owlet moths in the family Noctuidae. There are at least three described species in Chloridea.

The species of Chloridea were formerly members of the genus Heliothis, but were moved to Chloridea when it was reinstated as valid genus as a result of research published in 2013.

== Species ==
These species belong to the genus Chloridea:

- Chloridea subflexa (Guenée, 1852) (subflexus straw moth)
- Chloridea tergemina (Felder & Rogenhofer, 1874)
- Chloridea virescens (Fabricius, 1777) (tobacco budworm moth)
