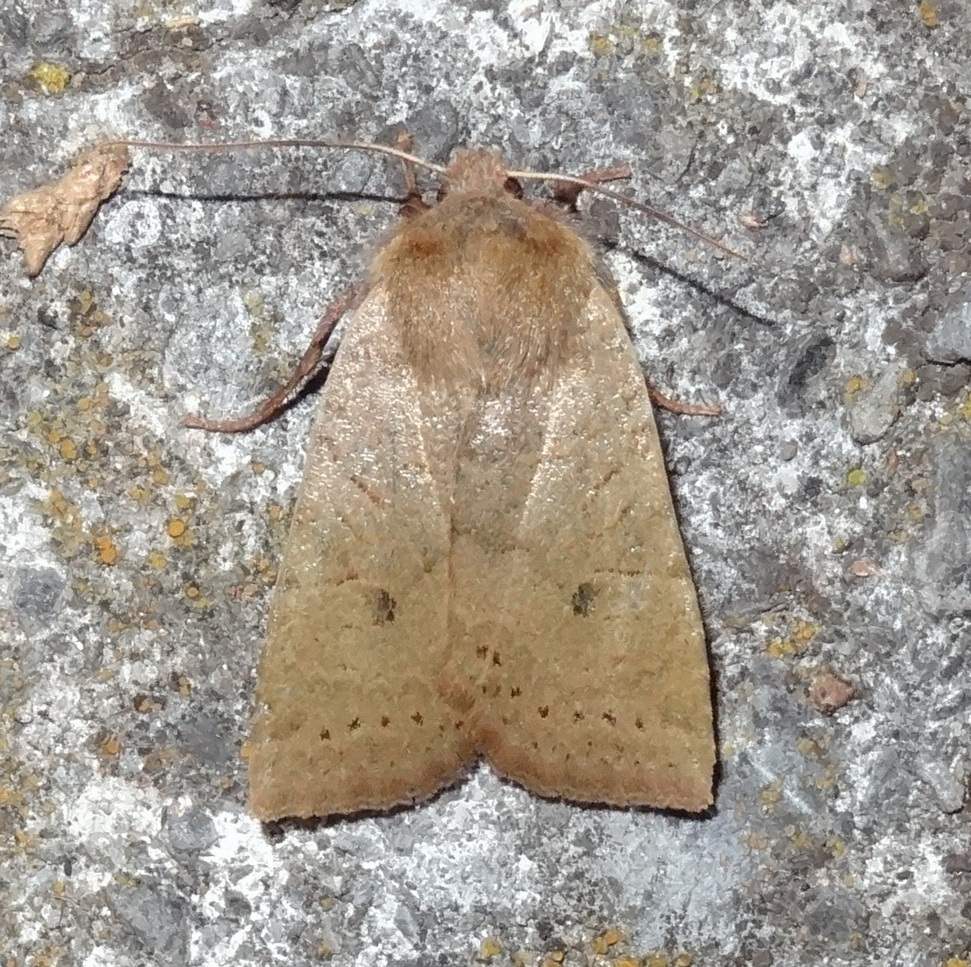
- Conistra anonyma at 300 m in Wangxiang, Xinyi, Nantou City, Taiwan

Scientific classification
- Domain: Eukaryota
- Kingdom: Animalia
- Phylum: Arthropoda
- Class: Insecta
- Order: Lepidoptera
- Superfamily: Noctuoidea
- Family: Noctuidae
- Subtribe: Xylenina
- Genus: Conistra; Hübner, [1821]

Synonyms
- Orrhodia Hübner, 1821; Gloia Hübner, 1822; Glaea Stephens, 1829; Heteromorpha Failla-Tedaldi, 1890; Orrhodiella Spuler, 1907

= Conistra =

Genus of moths

Conistra is a genus of moths of the family Noctuidae. The genus was erected by Jacob Hübner in 1821. There are three subgenera, Orrhodiella, Dasycampa and Peperina.

== Species ==
- Conistra acutula (Staudinger, 1891)
- Conistra albipuncta (Leech, 1889)
- Conistra alicia Lajonquiére, 1939
- Conistra anonyma Hreblay & Ronkay, 1998
- Conistra ardescens (Butler, 1879)
- Conistra ardescentina Hreblay & Ronkay, 1998
- Conistra asiatica Pinker, 1980
- Conistra aulombardi Hreblay, 1992
- Conistra castaneofasciata (Motschulsky, 1860)
- Conistra chaijami Hacker & Weigert, 1986
- Conistra daubei (Duponchel, [1839])
- Conistra dora Hreblay, 1992
- Conistra elegans Hörhammer, 1936
- Conistra eriophora (Püngeler, 1901)
- Conistra erythrocephala (Denis & Schiffermüller, 1775) – red-headed chestnut
- Conistra filipjevi Kononenko, 1978
- Conistra fletcheri Sugi, 1958
- Conistra gabori Hreblay, 1992
- Conistra gallica (Lederer, 1857)
- Conistra grisescens Draudt, 1950
- Conistra intricata (Boisduval, 1829)
- Conistra kasyi Boursin, 1963
- Conistra ligula (Esper, 1791) – dark chestnut
- Conistra metallica Hreblay & Ronkay, 1998
- Conistra metria Boursin, 1940
- Conistra nawae Matsumura, 1926
- Conistra plantei Rungs, 1972
- Conistra politina (Staudinger, 1888)
- Conistra ragusae (Failla-Tedaldi, 1890)
- Conistra rubiginea (Denis & Schiffermüller, 1775) – dotted chestnut
- Conistra rubiginosa (Scopoli, 1763) – black-spot chestnut
- Conistra rubricans Fibiger, 1997
- Conistra staudingeri (Graslin, 1863)
- Conistra takasago Kishida & Yoshimoto, 1979
- Conistra torrida (Lederer, 1857)
- Conistra vaccinii (Linnaeus, 1761) – chestnut
- Conistra veronicae (Hübner, [1813])
