= Hymenoptera training =

Bees or wasps trained to detect dangerous substances

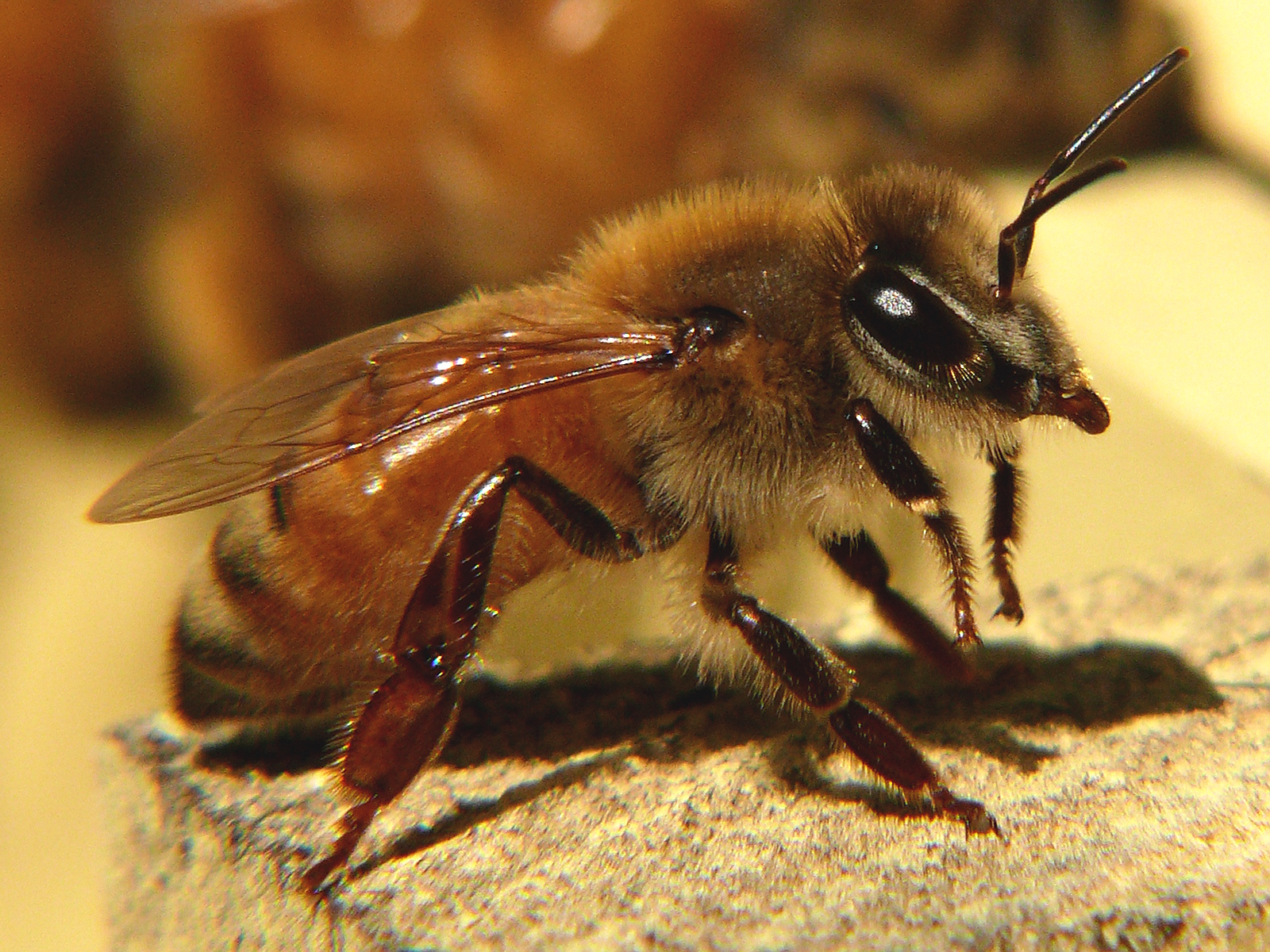
The Italian bee has been used for pollination for over 150 years.

Sniffer bees or sniffer wasps are insects in the order Hymenoptera that can be trained to perform a variety of tasks to detect substances such as explosive materials or illegal drugs, as well as some human and plant diseases. The sensitivity of the olfactory senses of bees and wasps in particular has been shown to rival the abilities of sniffer dogs, though they can only be trained to detect a single scent each.

== Intelligence ==
Ethologist Karl von Frisch dedicated much of his career to the study of the sensory perceptions of the honey bee and was one of the first people to translate the meaning of the waggle dance. His studies show that bees can count to five and have the capacity to be trained to visit specific feeding stations at certain times of day.

== Odour detection ==
Bees and wasps are trained using classical conditioning, being exposed to a particular odour and then rewarded with a sugar solution. Within five minutes they learn to associate the smell with an impending supply of food and this triggers the proboscis extension reflex (sticking out their tongues).

Trained hymenopterans have been shown to successfully detect explosive materials including TNT, Semtex, and C-4 as well as gunpowder and propellants. Wasps can be trained to detect the early signs of fungal disease on crops and may have medicinal value, identifying people with cancer just by being exposed to their breath. Bees have been shown to detect and respond to more than 60 different odours including methamphetamine, uranium, and tuberculosis. They have been used to detect lung and skin cancers, diabetes, and to confirm pregnancy. It is not known if they can detect potential seizures in humans.

Researchers at the University of Georgia have built a device named the "Wasp Hound" which contains the parasitic wasp species Microplitis croceipes. The insects normally walk around the PVC pipe in which they are housed but begin to migrate towards the source of an odour when it is the one that they were trained to recognise. These movements are tracked by a computer, with small cameras inside the device sending images for processing. Within 30 seconds of the wasps beginning to congregate near an odour source an alarm is sounded.
