= Peperina (moth) =

Scientific classification
- Kingdom: Animalia
- Phylum: Arthropoda
- Clade: Pancrustacea
- Class: Insecta
- Order: Lepidoptera
- Superfamily: Noctuoidea
- Family: Noctuidae
- Genus: Conistra
- Subgenus: Peperina; Hreblay, 1992

Subgenus of moths

Peperina is a subgenus of moths of the family Noctuidae.
