= Microplitis croceipes =

Scientific classification
- Kingdom: Animalia
- Phylum: Arthropoda
- Clade: Pancrustacea
- Class: Insecta
- Order: Hymenoptera
- Family: Braconidae
- Genus: Microplitis
- Species: M. croceipes

Binomial name
- Microplitis croceipes (Cresson, 1872)

Species of wasp

Microplitis croceipes is a braconid wasp native to the US state of Georgia. It is an important parasitoid of caterpillars, including those of major agricultural pests Helicoverpa zea (formerly called Heliothis zea) and Heliothis virescens.

Microplitis croceipes uses its antennae to detect the odor of caterpillar frass, or feces. The wasp deposits a single egg inside the caterpillar; as the wasp larvae mature they feed on the caterpillar, which weakens and dies after the larvae emerge and pupate. The wasp larvae then spin cocoons and pupate inside them. Adult wasps emerge after a week.

Because the olfactory system of M. croceipes is linked to its taste receptors, wasps can be trained to respond to the smell of an arbitrary chemical if the smell is repeatedly presented in association with food (sugar water or caterpillars). The smell of "food" triggers a characteristic pattern of activity, a short-range host-seeking response. Researchers have said that M. croceipes has great potential for use as a biological sensor "due to its ability to be conditioned, respond and discriminate target odors from background odors." The Wasp Hound "portable nose" device depends on trained M. croceipes as its biosensor.
