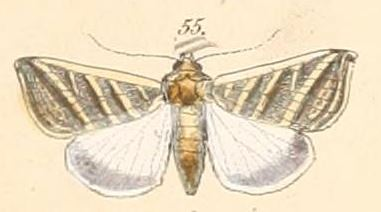

Scientific classification
- Kingdom: Animalia
- Phylum: Arthropoda
- Class: Insecta
- Order: Lepidoptera
- Superfamily: Noctuoidea
- Family: Noctuidae
- Subfamily: Heliothinae
- Genus: Chloridea
- Species: C. tergemina

Binomial name
- Chloridea tergemina (Felder & Rogenhofer, 1874)

= Chloridea tergemina =

Species of moth

Chloridea tergemina is a species of moth of the family Noctuidae. It is found in South America, including Brazil.

The larvae feed on various solanaceaeous plants.

The species was formerly a member of the genus Heliothis, but was moved to the reinstated genus Chloridea as a result of genetic and morphological research published in 2013.
