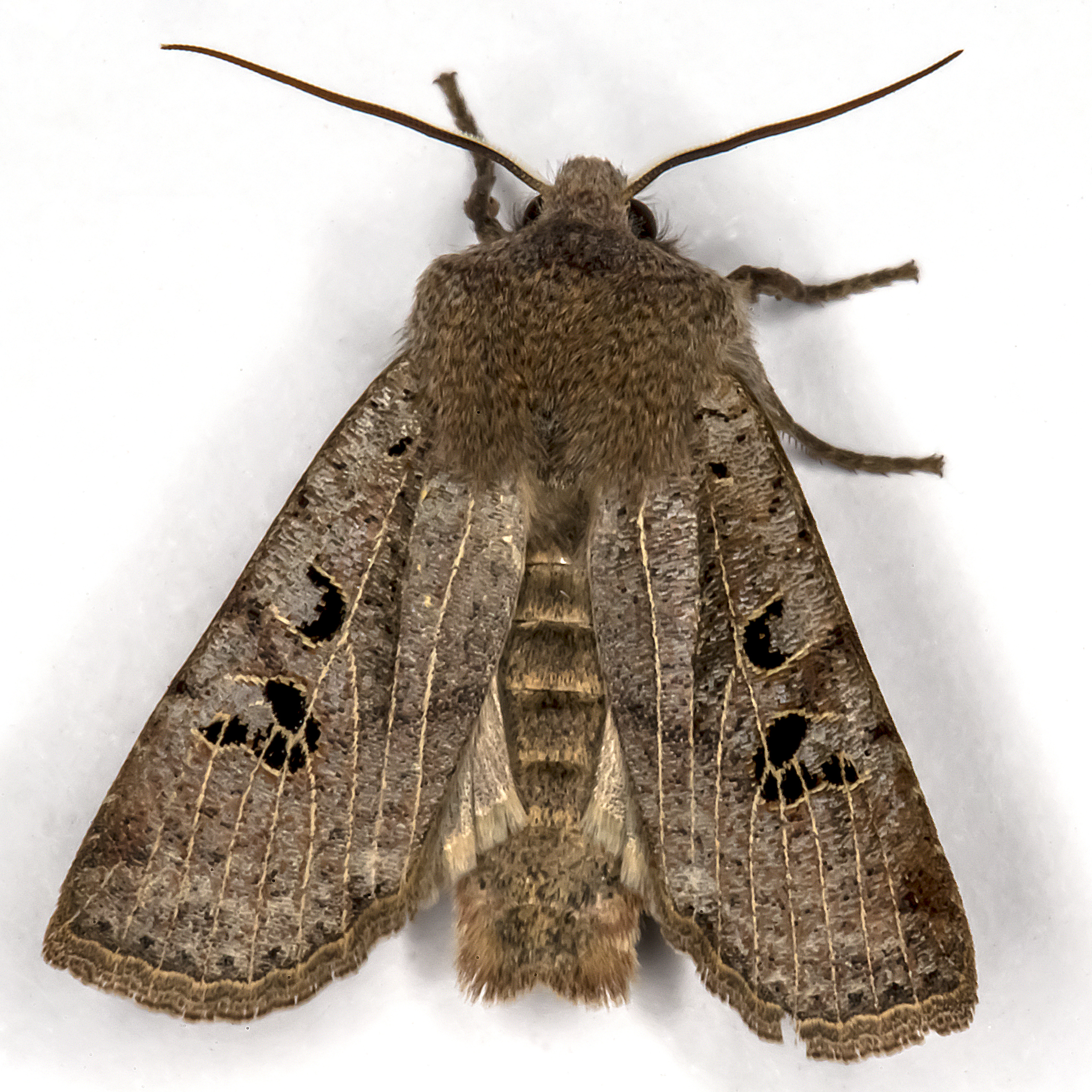
- Male
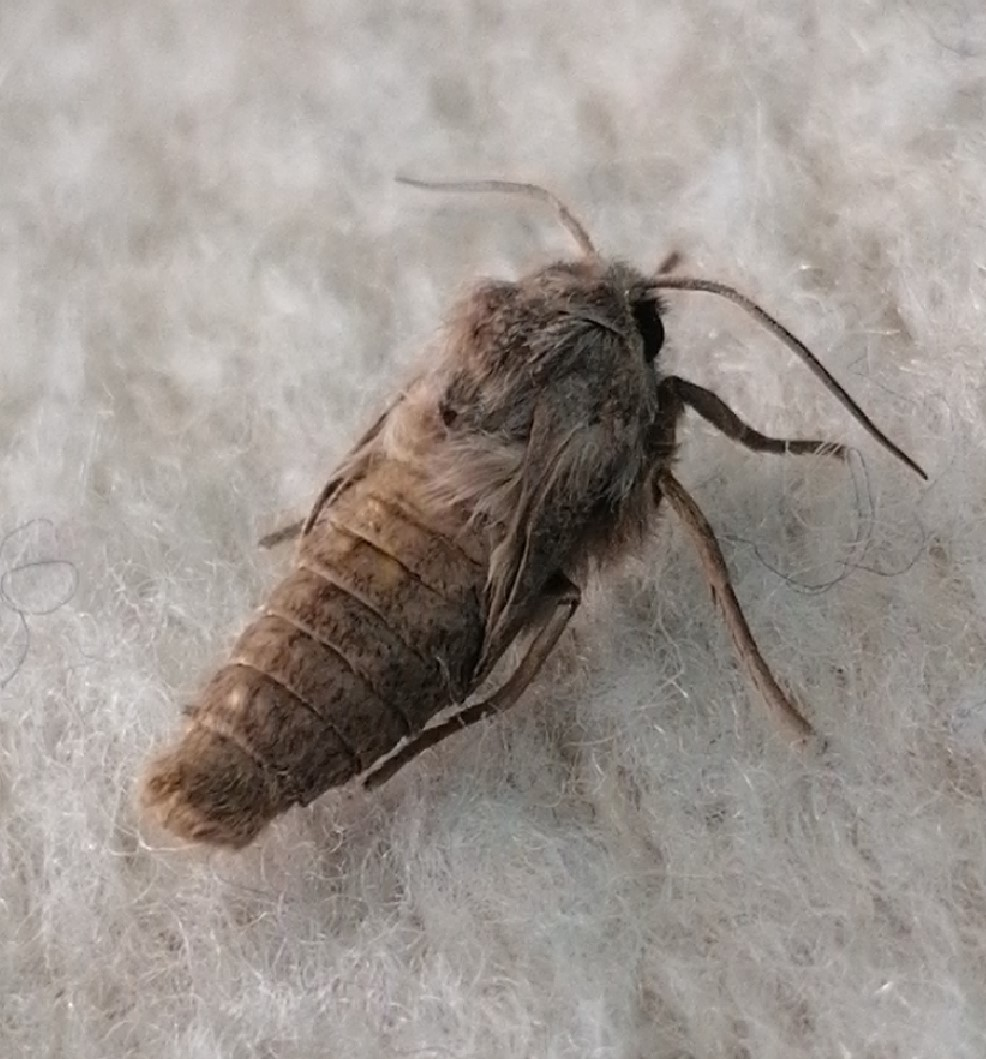
- Female

Scientific classification
- Kingdom: Animalia
- Phylum: Arthropoda
- Class: Insecta
- Order: Lepidoptera
- Superfamily: Noctuoidea
- Family: Noctuidae
- Genus: Conistra
- Species: C. rubiginosa

Binomial name
- Conistra rubiginosa (Scopoli, 1763)

= Conistra rubiginosa =

Species of moth

Conistra rubiginosa, the Black-spotted chestnut, is a moth of the family Noctuidae. The species was first described by Giovanni Antonio Scopoli in his 1763 Entomologia Carniolica. It is found in Europe.

== Description ==
The length of the forewings is 15–16 mm. Warren (1914) states vau-punctatum Esp. (= silene F.) (35 h). Forewing rufous or dull purplish, overlaid with grey; the veins finely pale; lines indistinct, paler, with slightly darker edges; submarginal with a rufous cloud before it on costa; some dark marginal lunules; stigmata pale grey, the orbicular with a black crescent in lower half, the reniform with black spots, separated by the pale veins, on lower and outer edges; a small dark spot at base of cell; the costa and base of wing with lilac grey striations; hindwing pale fuscous, with large dull cellspot; fringe pale, sometimes rufous-tinged; — immaculata Stgr. is a rare form in which the stigmata are without the black spots on their margins; — gallica Led. [ now species Conistra gallica (Lederer, 1857) (35 h), from France and the Pyrenees, is a local form in which the purplish ground colour is less obscured by the grey suffusion; the area beyond outer line being dark with the submarginal line well-marked across it; and the bent median shade is also purplish; at the same time the grey suffusion, especially at base and along costa, is more strongly expressed. Larva brown, the dorsal and subdorsal lines pale yellowish; oblique mottled lines meeting to form V-shaped marks on dorsum; spiracles black;head red brown; venter grey; living at first on Prunus, afterwards polyphagous on low plants. Generally distributed in Europe, except Britain.

== Biology ==
The moth flies in one generation from October to late April.

The larvae feed on various shrubs, deciduous trees and herbaceous plants, including common lilac, apple, rose and Prunus spinosa.

== Distribution ==
It is found in central and southern Europe. In the north, the distribution area extends to southern Fennoscandia, Lithuania and Latvia; in the east it extends to Ukraine and western Turkey. In England records suggesting established breeding populations are scattered in the south where it was first seen in 2011.

== Notes ==
1. The flight season refers to the Netherlands. This may vary in other parts of the range.
