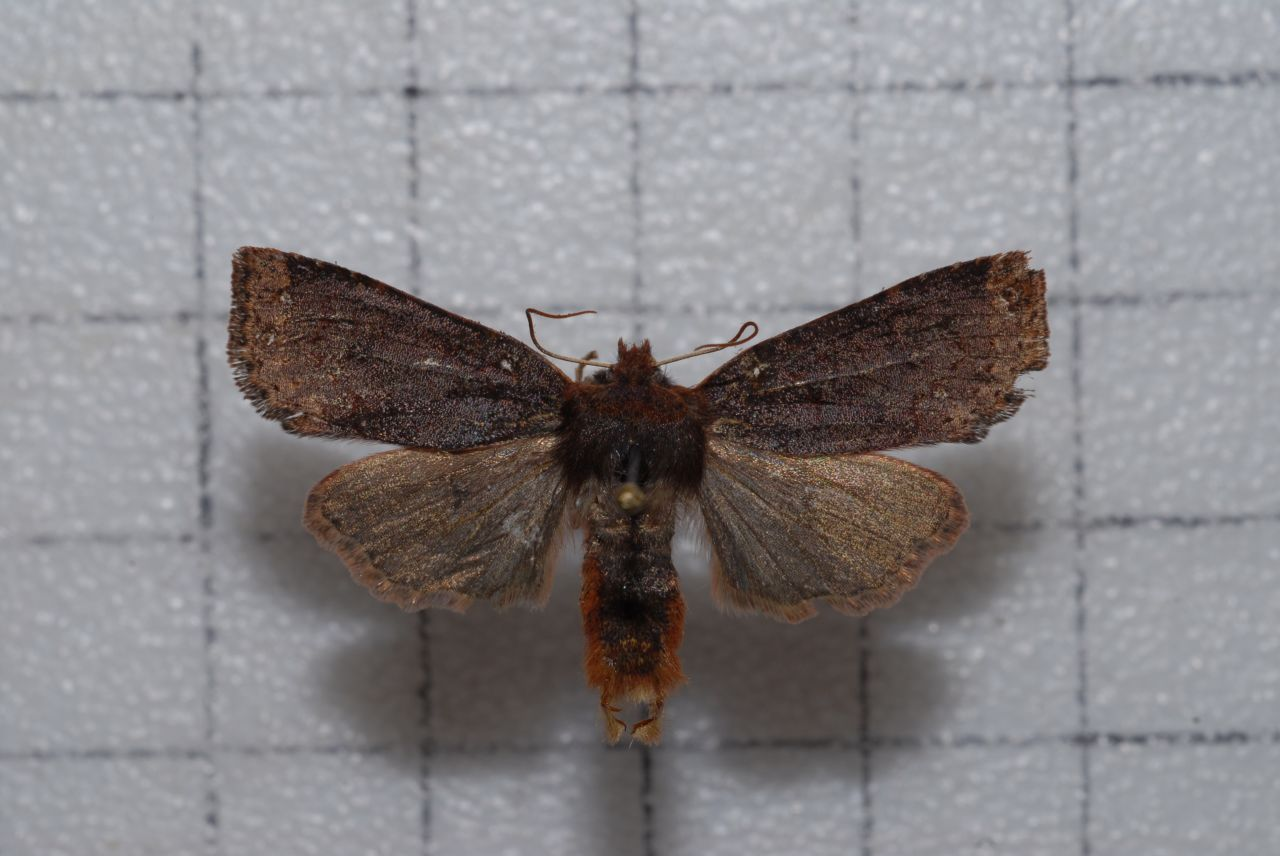

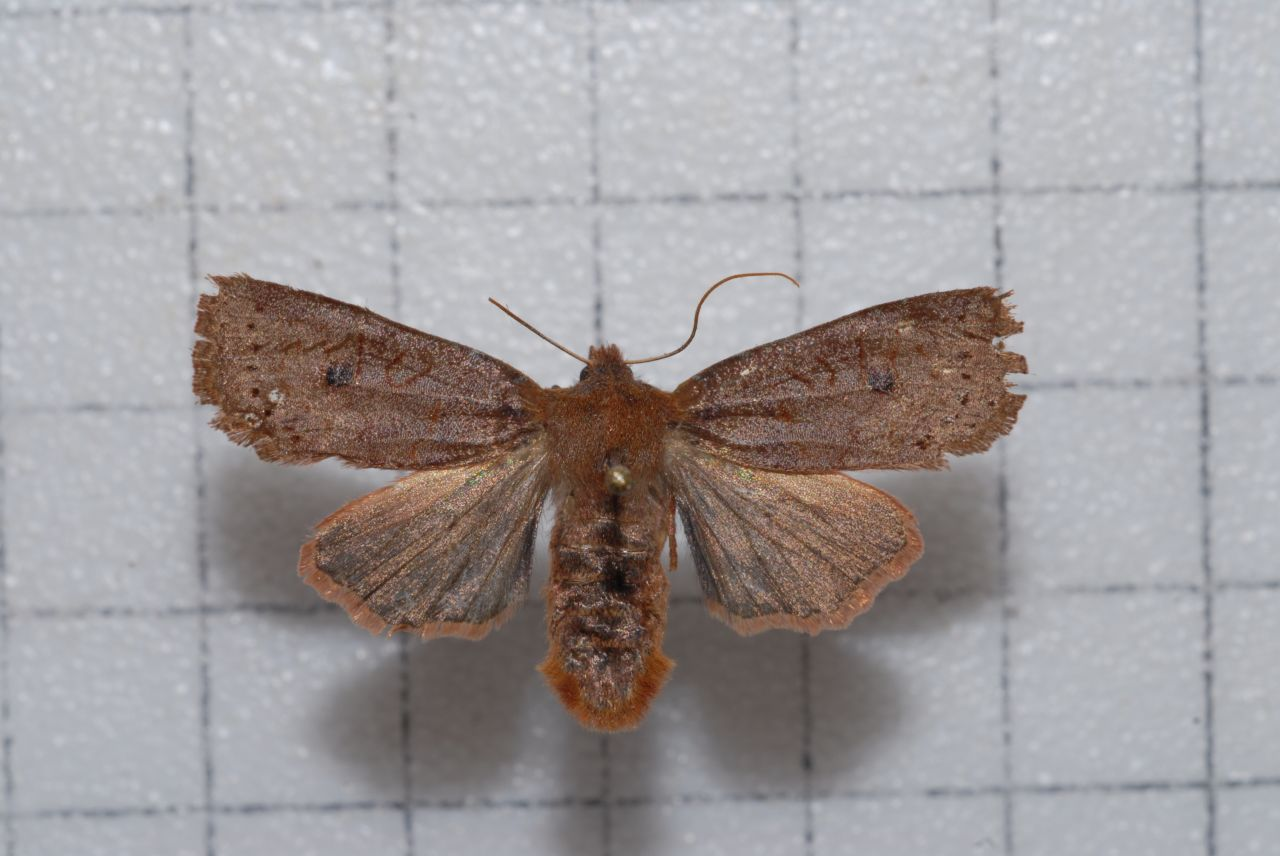

Scientific classification
- Domain: Eukaryota
- Kingdom: Animalia
- Phylum: Arthropoda
- Class: Insecta
- Order: Lepidoptera
- Superfamily: Noctuoidea
- Family: Noctuidae
- Genus: Conistra
- Species: C. takasago

Binomial name
- Conistra takasago Kishida & Yoshimoto, 1979

= Conistra takasago =

Species of moth

Conistra takasago is a moth of the family Noctuidae. The species was first described by Yasunori Kishida and Hiroshi Yoshimoto in 1979. It is found in Taiwan.
