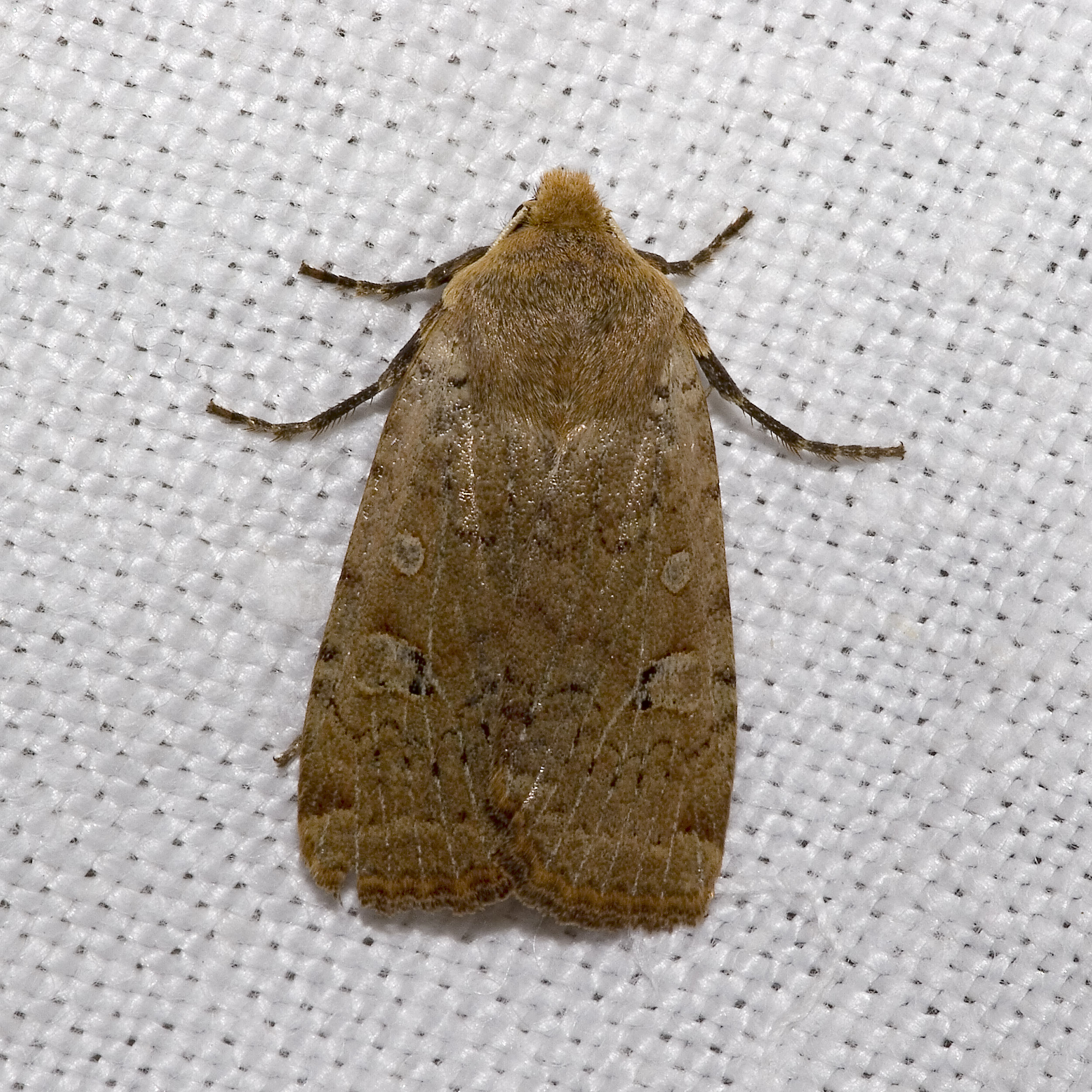

Scientific classification
- Kingdom: Animalia
- Phylum: Arthropoda
- Clade: Pancrustacea
- Class: Insecta
- Order: Lepidoptera
- Superfamily: Noctuoidea
- Family: Noctuidae
- Genus: Conistra
- Subgenus: Conistra (Dasycampa)
- Species: C. erythrocephala

Binomial name
- Conistra erythrocephala (Denis & Schiffermüller, 1775)

= Conistra erythrocephala =

Species of moth

Conistra erythrocephala, the red-headed chestnut, is a moth of the family Noctuidae. It is distributed in central and southern Europe and is recorded from Asia Minor, (Amasia).

== Technical description and variation ==
C. erythrocephala F. (35 g). Forewing dull red-brown, suffused to a greater or less degree with grey; lines obscure, indistinctly double; the submarginal with a darker blotch before it on costa; upper stigmata generally filled up with grey, with paler brown-edged annuli, often obscure and unicolorous : the reniform generally with black spots round its lower end; hindwing greyish fuscous; the fringe pale ochreous; in ab. glabra Hbn. (35 g) the ground colour is darker, more purplish-brown, with the costal streak, the two stigmata, and a submarginal fascia pale grey; the lines are also generally paler and more evident; — ab. impunctata Spul. (35 g) has the reniform stigma unmarked by black points, the other markings being often in these cases more obscure, and the ground colour striated with dark; in pallida Tutt (35 g) the dark ground colour is overlaid and hidden by pale grey suffusion. Larva grey brown or yellowish-brown; dorsal and subdorsal lines fine and pale, the latter sometimes obsolete; the dorsum dotted with white; spiracles black. The wingspan is around 38 mm (1.5 in).

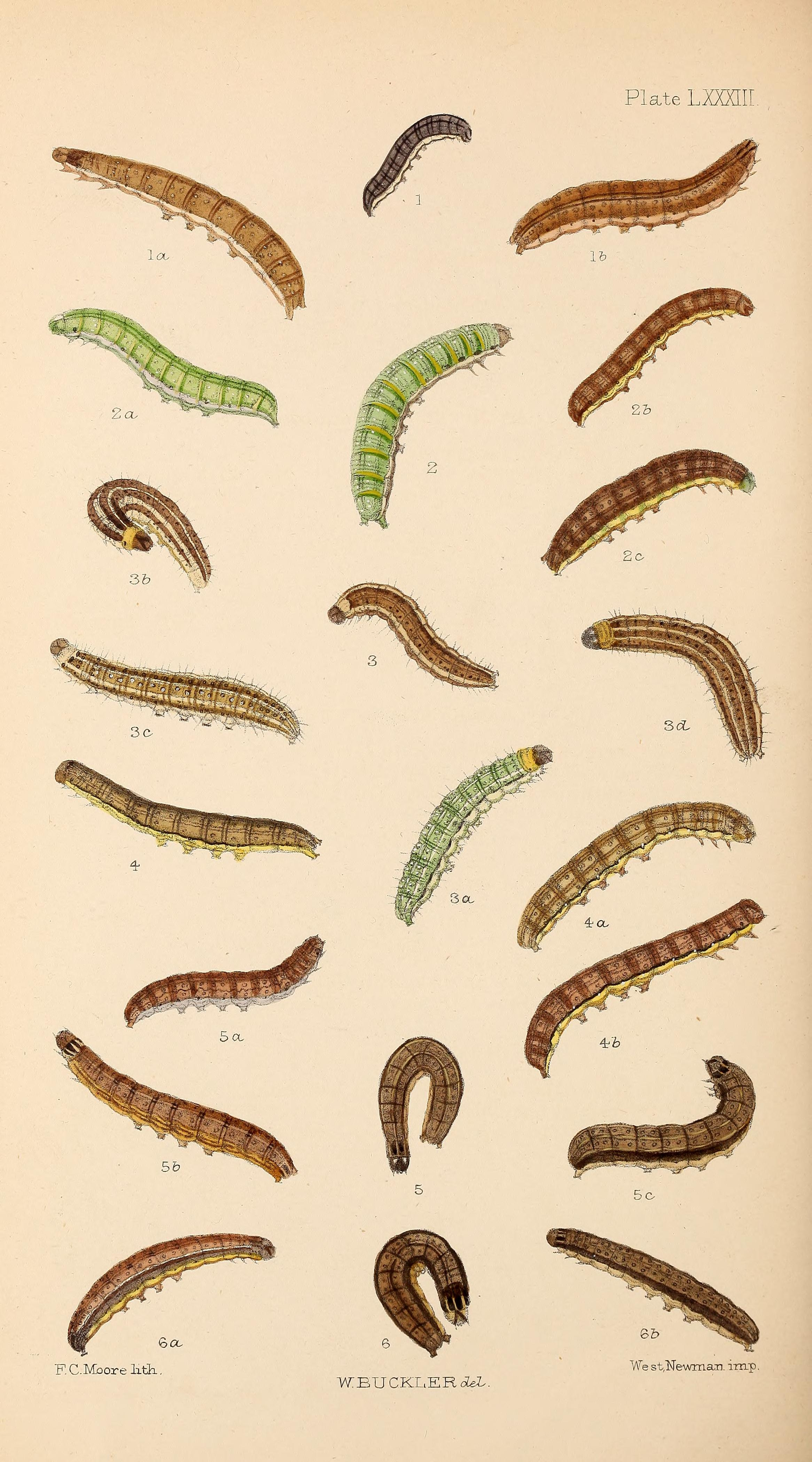
Figs 6, 6a, 6b larvae after final moult

== Biology ==
The moths fly from August/September to early May (it is active in Winter). The caterpillars live from mid-April to June.

== Recorded food plants ==
The larvae feed on young leaves of oak (Quercus species) and elm (Ulmus species) before descending to feed on herbaceous plants.
