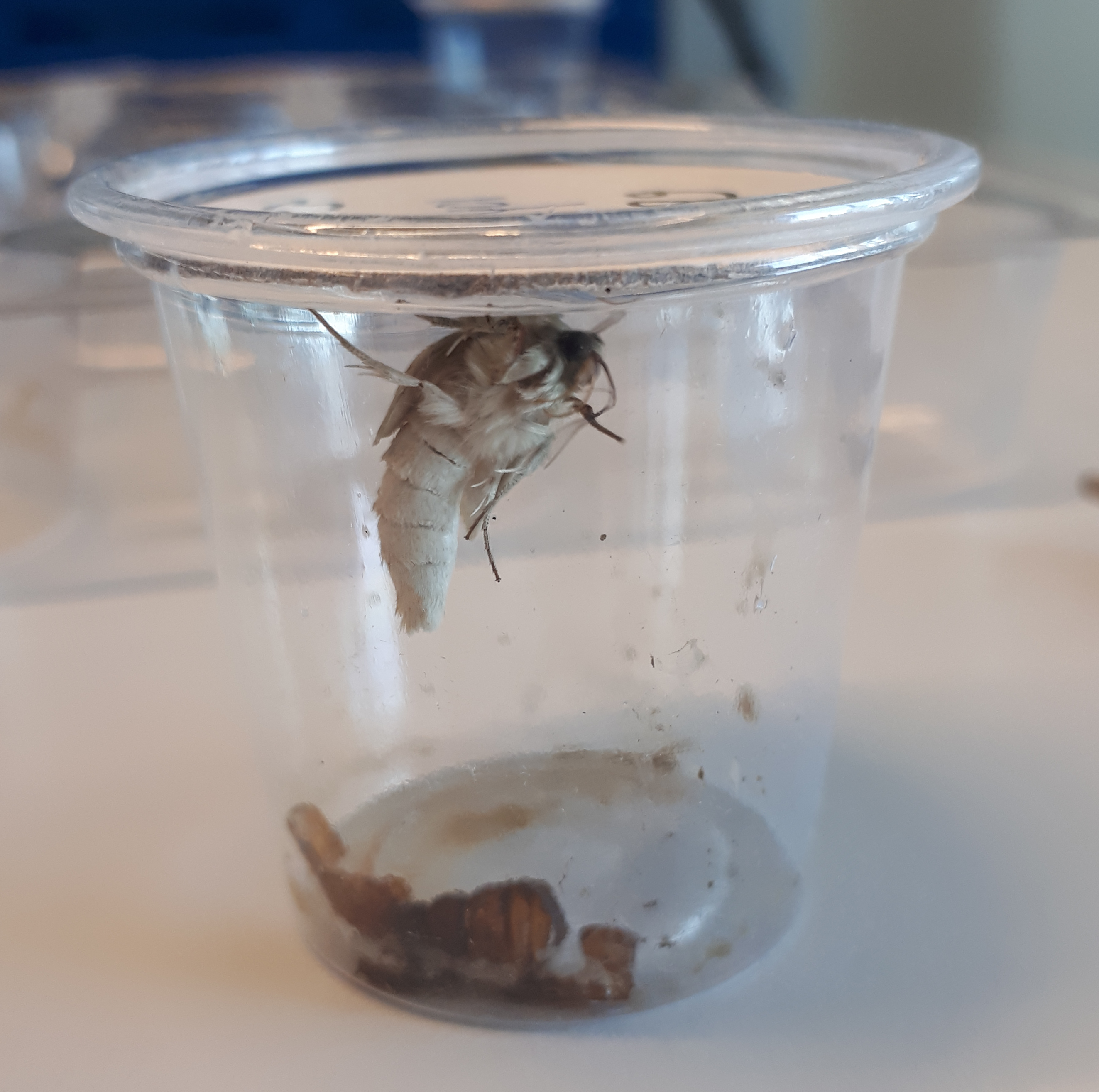
- Chloridea subflexa seconds after hatching

Scientific classification
- Domain: Eukaryota
- Kingdom: Animalia
- Phylum: Arthropoda
- Class: Insecta
- Order: Lepidoptera
- Superfamily: Noctuoidea
- Family: Noctuidae
- Subfamily: Heliothinae
- Genus: Chloridea (Guenée, 1852)
- Species: C. subflexa

Binomial name
- Chloridea subflexa (Guenée, 1852)

Synonyms
- Aspila subflexa Guenée, 1852

= Chloridea subflexa =

Species of moth

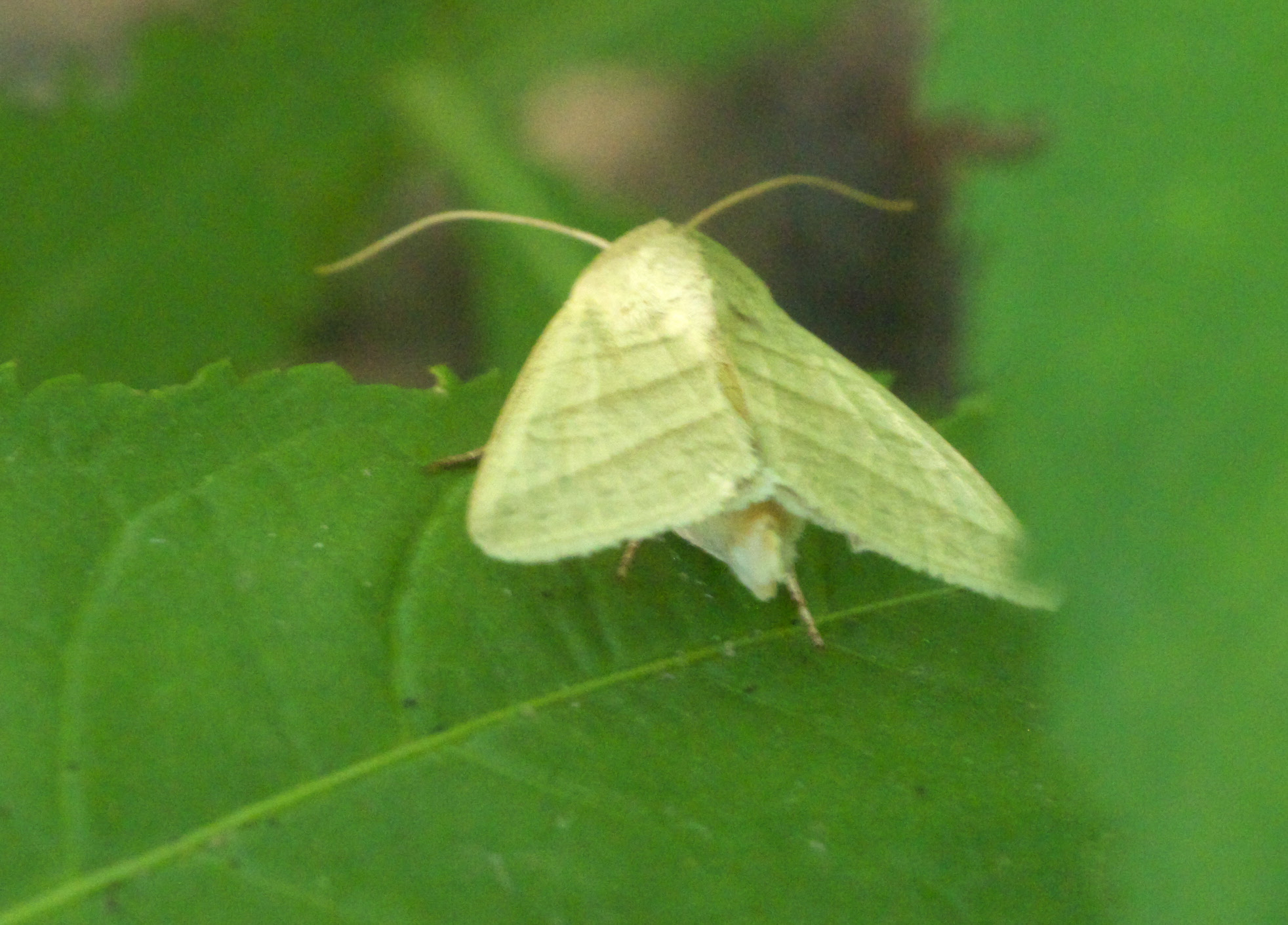
Chloridea subflexa

Chloridea subflexa is a moth of the family Noctuidae first described by Achille Guenée in 1852. It is found from most of the United States, throughout the Antilles, and south to Argentina.

The MONA or Hodges number for Chloridea subflexa is 11070.
