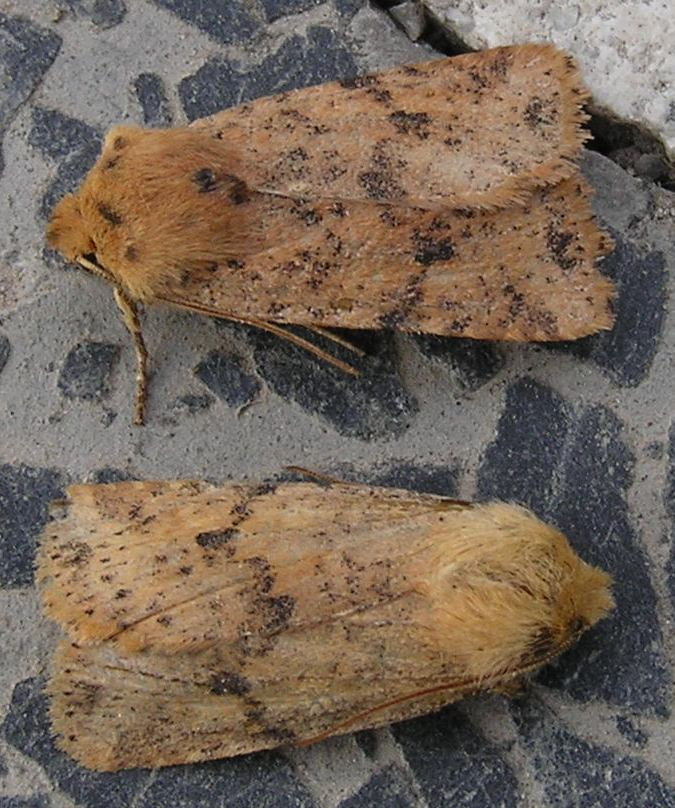

Scientific classification
- Kingdom: Animalia
- Phylum: Arthropoda
- Clade: Pancrustacea
- Class: Insecta
- Order: Lepidoptera
- Superfamily: Noctuoidea
- Family: Noctuidae
- Genus: Conistra
- Species: C. rubiginea

Binomial name
- Conistra rubiginea (Denis & Schiffermüller, 1775)

= Conistra rubiginea =

Species of moth

Conistra rubiginea, the dotted chestnut, is a moth of the family Noctuidae. The species was first described by Michael Denis and Ignaz Schiffermüller in 1775. It is distributed in Europe and, according to William Warren, Armenia and Asia Minor.

== Technical description and variation ==
C. rubiginea F. ( pulverea Hbn., neurodes Hbn., rubigo Rmb.) (36 e). Forewing fulvous yellow; the lines fulvous brown, marked by black spots on veins; the basal, inner, and outer lines double; median shade often broad and diffuse, rarely swollen so as to darken the central area on inner margin; orbicular and reniform of the pale ground colour, undefined, the former with a black centre, the latter with lower lobe black, the lateral margin on each side of it pale yellow; terminal area narrowly brown; hindwing blackish fuscous, the fringe rufous; —. specimens suffused with fulvous brown form the ab. tigerina Esp. (36 e);— unicolor Tutt has body and forewing brick-red, the black points few, restricted to base of submedian fold, the centre of orbicular stigma, the submarginal and marginal points, and the lower part of the reniform; hindwing reddish ochreous with dark brown suffusion; — ab. modesta Hmps. has the thorax and forewing deep fulvous, except the basal area and the lines of the stigmata, which remain yellow; — ab. completa Hmps. (36 e) has the thorax and forewing uniformly deep fulvous. Larva dark brown, with a black blotch on each segment on the dorsum; lines obscurely paler; a dark line above the feet; feeds on numerous low plants. The larva, which is anomalously protected by brownish-yellow hairs, is said to be found, as well as the pupa, in ants' nests. The wingspan is 30–35 mm.

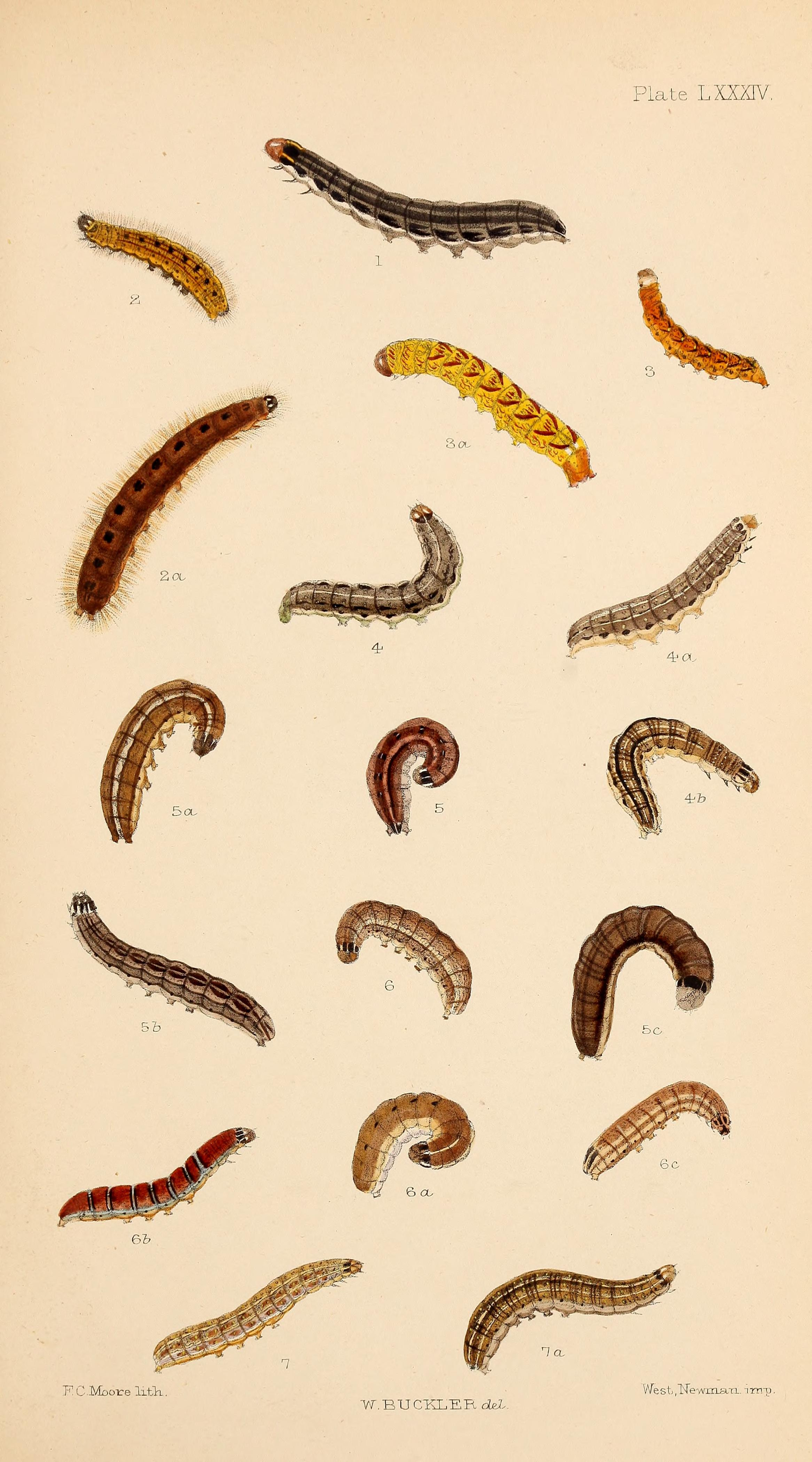
Figs 2, 2a, larvae after final moult

.

== Biology ==
The moth flies from October to November and from February to May depending on the location.

== Recorded food plants ==
The larvae feed on various deciduous trees including Quercus, Salix and Ulmus, it has also been observed herbaceous plants including Plantago.
