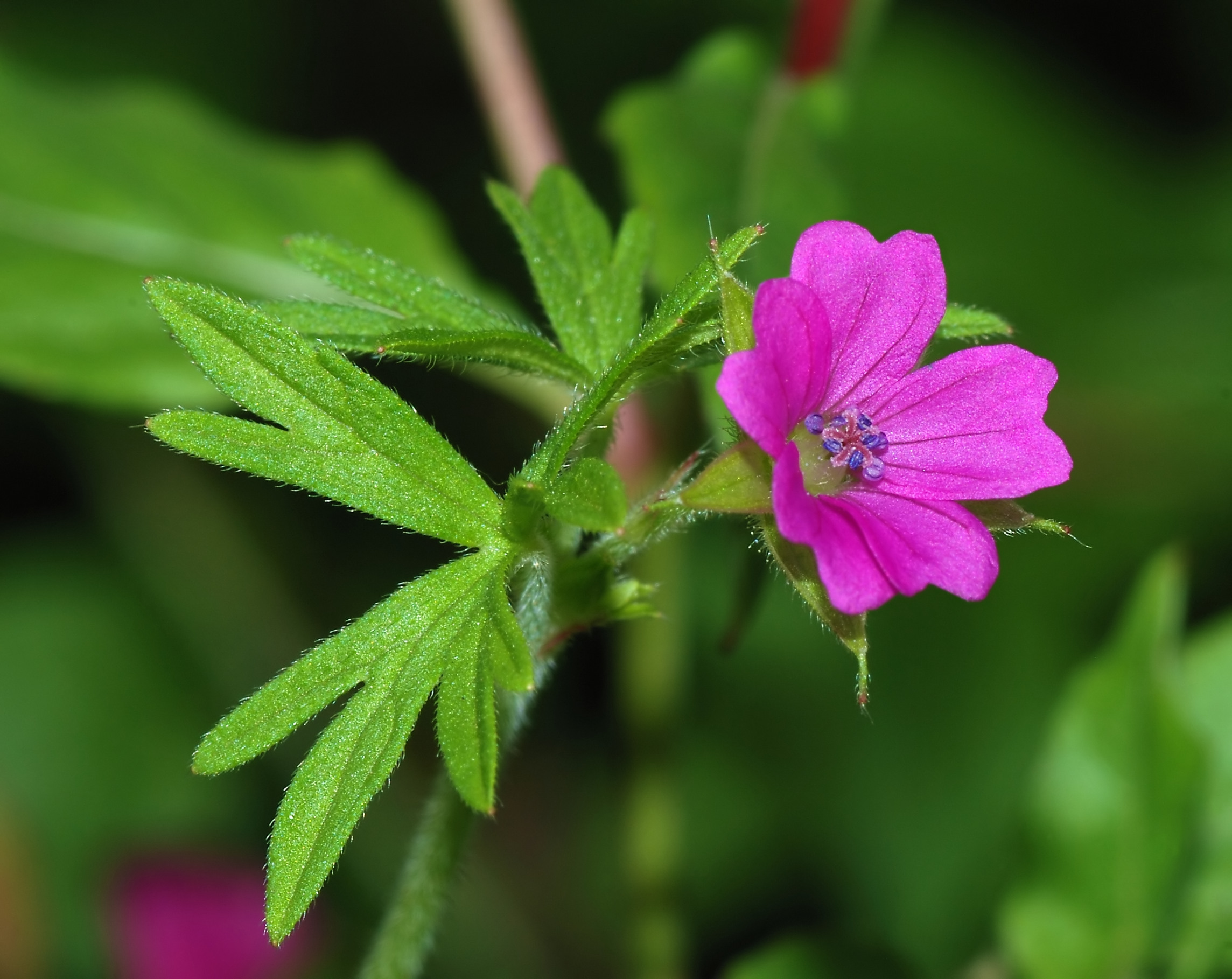

Scientific classification
- Kingdom: Plantae
- Clade: Tracheophytes
- Clade: Angiosperms
- Clade: Eudicots
- Clade: Rosids
- Order: Geraniales
- Family: Geraniaceae
- Genus: Geranium
- Species: G. dissectum

Binomial name
- Geranium dissectum L.

Synonyms
- Geranium laxum

= Geranium dissectum =

Species of flowering plant

Geranium dissectum or cut-leaved crane's-bill is a plant species of the genus Geranium. It is native to Europe.

It can be found on other continents as well, in some instances as an introduced species. It can be found in North America, where it is known as the cutleaf geranium.

Extracts of Geranium dissectum are reported to improve germination rates of Hemp seeds.

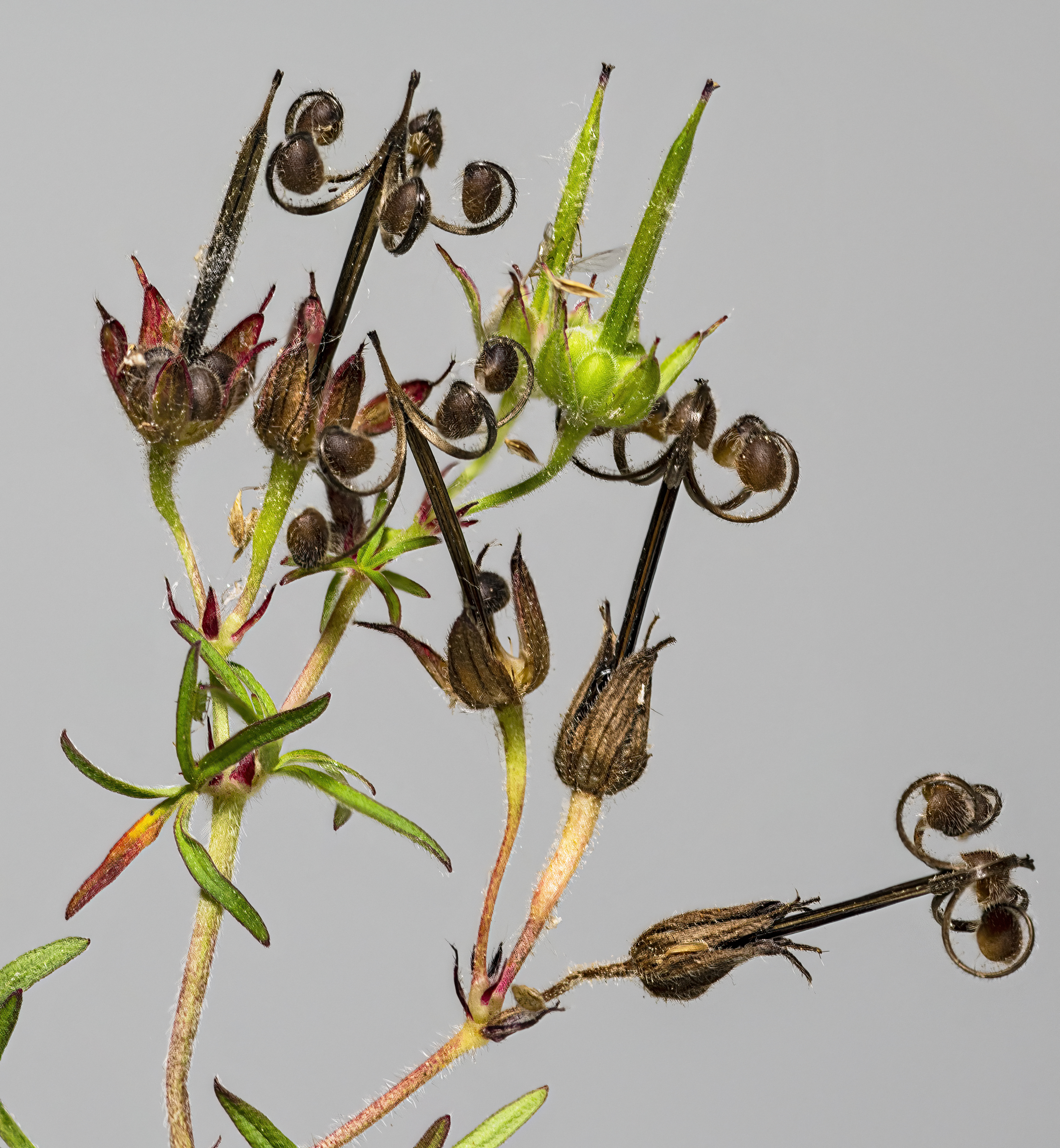
Geranium dissectum fruits, one undischarged, two of which have discharged their seed-bearing carpels by flinging out the seed as the awns dry, shrink, and split off elastically.

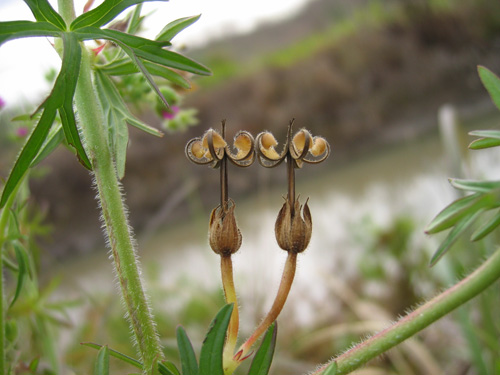
Leaves are deeply cut
