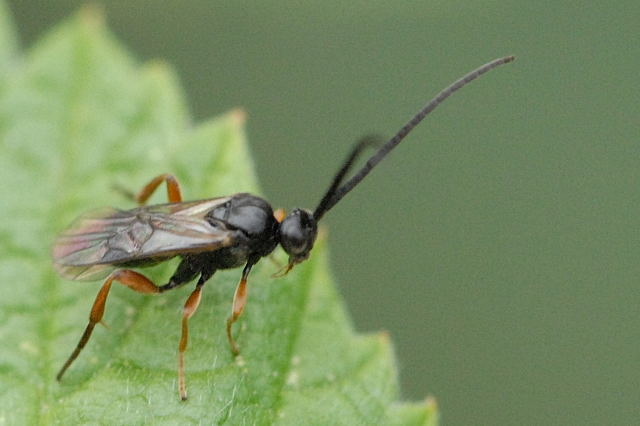
- Microplitis

Scientific classification
- Kingdom: Animalia
- Phylum: Arthropoda
- Clade: Pancrustacea
- Class: Insecta
- Order: Hymenoptera
- Family: Braconidae
- Subfamily: Microgastrinae
- Genus: Microplitis; Förster, 1862

Diversity
- more than 190 species

= Microplitis =

Genus of wasps

Microplitis is a genus of wasp in the parasitoid family Braconidae. There are more than 190 described species in Microplitis, found throughout the world.

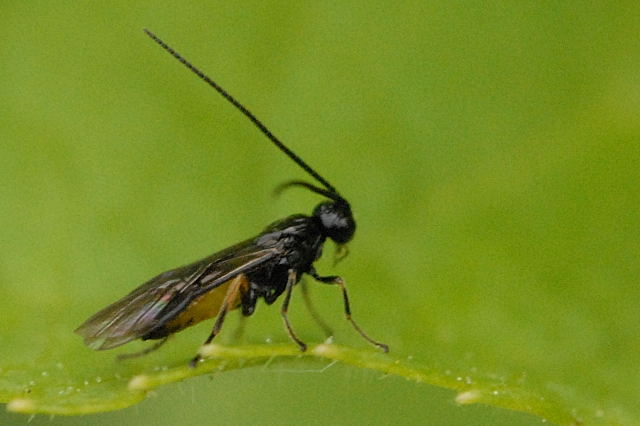
Microplitis

== See also ==
- List of Microplitis species
