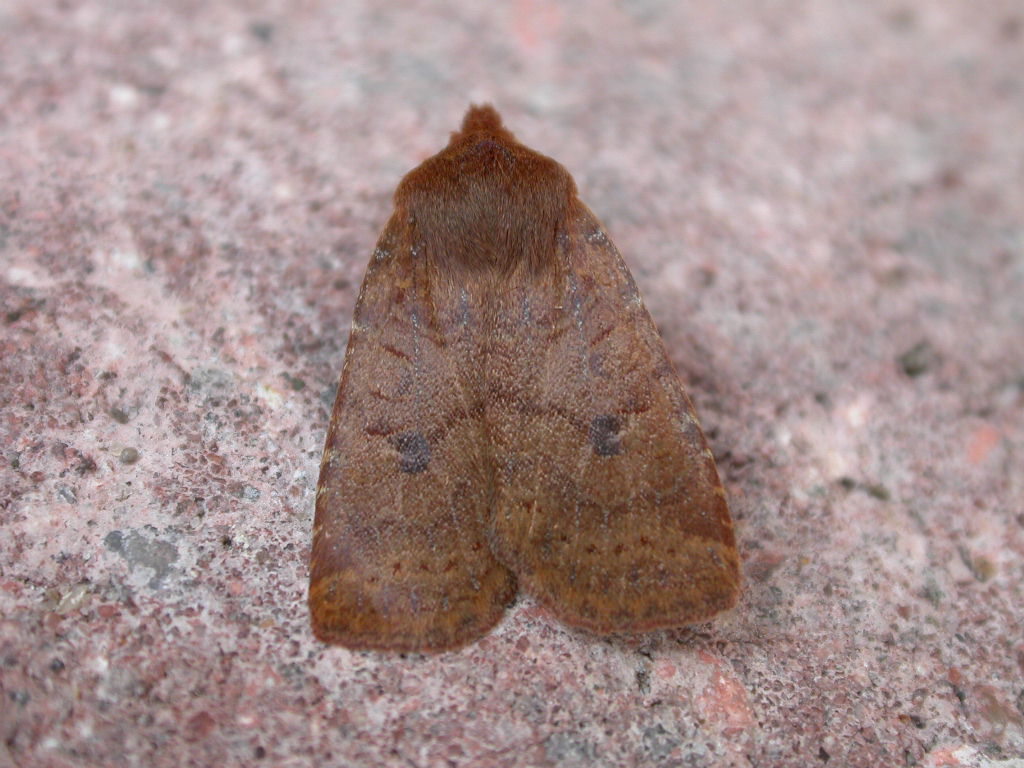

Scientific classification
- Kingdom: Animalia
- Phylum: Arthropoda
- Clade: Pancrustacea
- Class: Insecta
- Order: Lepidoptera
- Superfamily: Noctuoidea
- Family: Noctuidae
- Genus: Conistra
- Species: C. vaccinii

Binomial name
- Conistra vaccinii (Linnaeus, 1761)

= Conistra vaccinii =

Chestnut

Species of moth

Conistra vaccinii, the chestnut, is a moth of the family Noctuidae. The species was first described by Carl Linnaeus in 1761. It is distributed throughout Europe, North Africa and east through the Palearctic to Siberia.

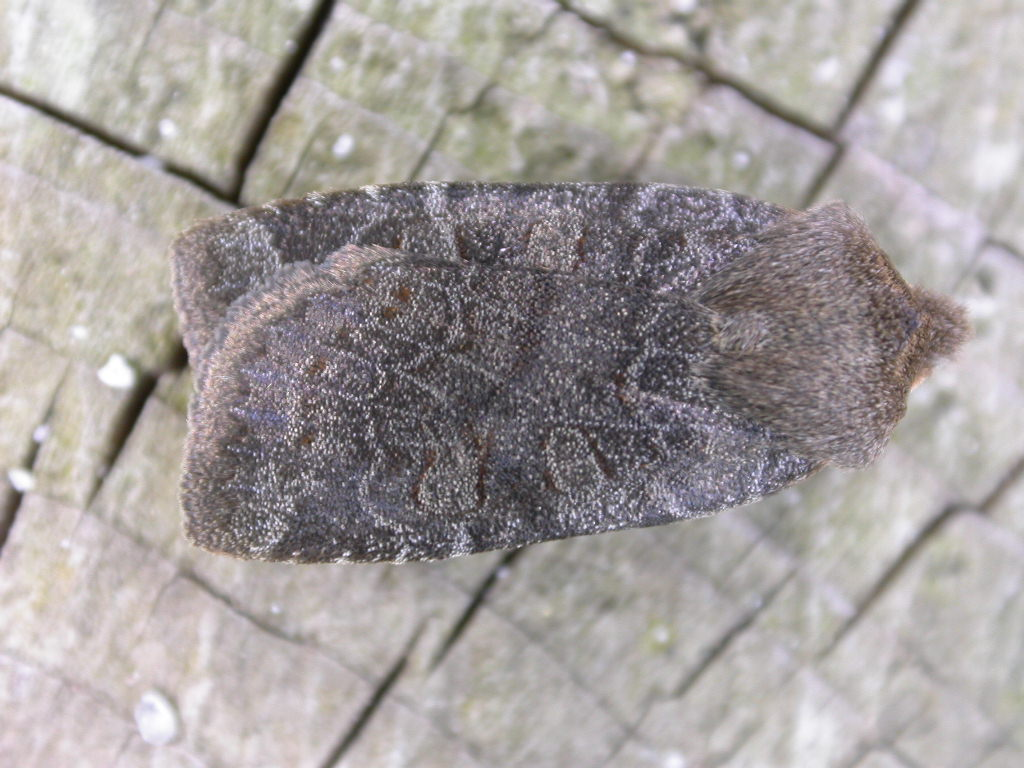

== Distribution ==
The species occurs on some Mediterranean islands (Balearics, Corsica, and Sardinia), in Northern Fennoscandia, and most of Europe except for southern Spain. The range extends south from Morocco in the west to Mediterranean North Africa, through Anatolia to Turkestan and Western and Central Siberia. In the German central uplands, it rises to about 1200 meters.

== Description ==
The wingspan is 28–36 mm. Pattern and colouring are extremely variable. The colour varies from dove grey to dark grey brown, with light brown, light red, reddish-brown to black-brown markings. This has led to the distinction of formae (forms). The apex of the front wing is slightly concave. The head and thorax are coloured mostly according to the wing colour; the abdomen is partially or completely reddish brown. The inner and outer, serrated crossbars are usually darker than the colour and more or less clearly defined. These are often white lined specimens with much darker crossbars. Reniform and orbicular and stains can be as well shown, but also sometimes almost absent. There is always a black dot in the lower part of the reniform. The more or less significant medium shade is darker than the colour and has a strong median bulge. The wavy line is often a series of black dots.

== Biology ==
The moth flies from September to May depending on the location. The larva is reddish brown above, and greenish beneath, sometimes the upper surface is tinged with green also; the dorsum is freckled with pale brown, and the three lines along it are faintly paler, the raised dots are whitish. The head is glossy pale brown, freckled with reddish-brown, and lined with darker brown.

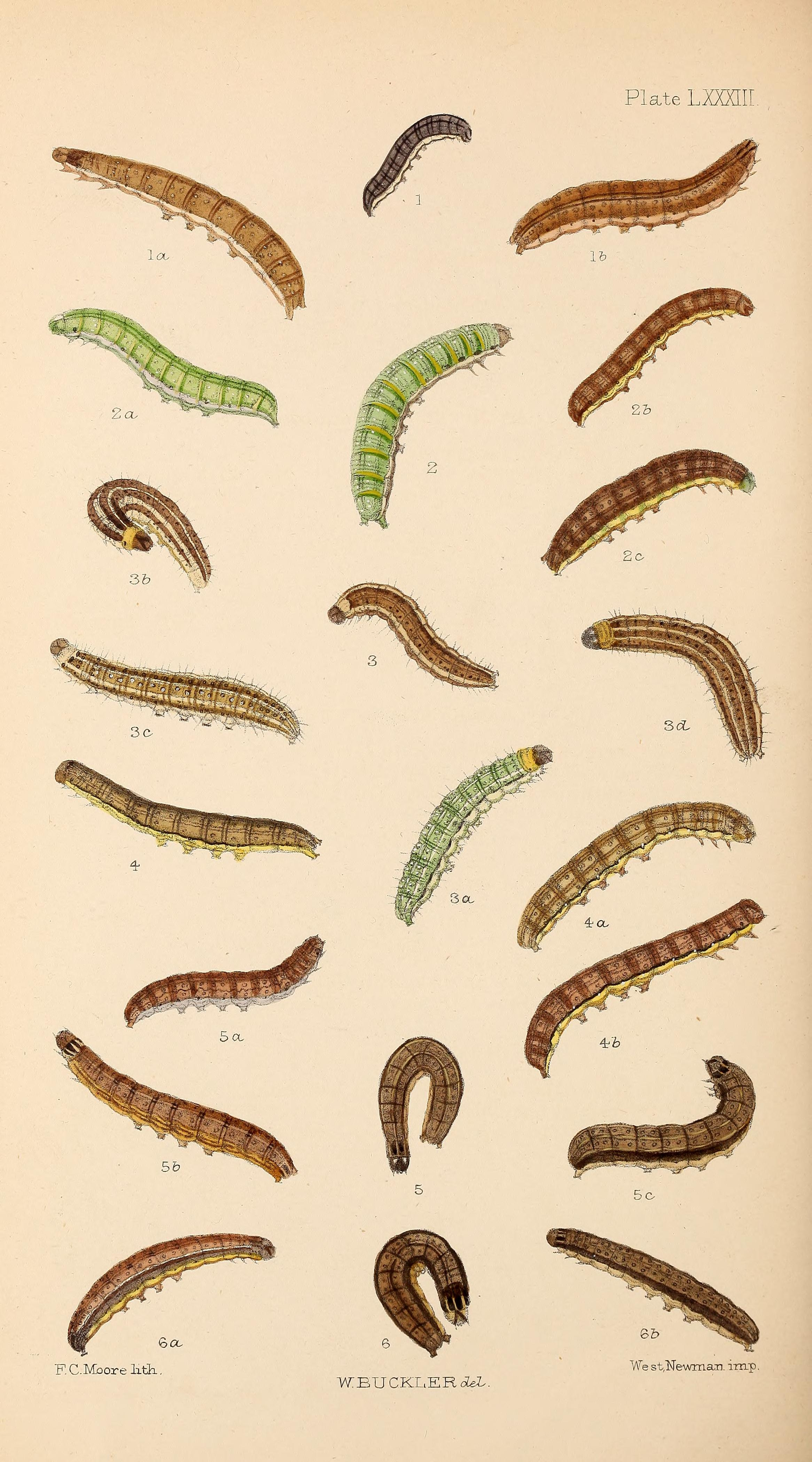
Figs 5, 5a, 5b, 5c larvae in various stages

== Recorded food plants ==
The larva feeds on various deciduous trees and shrubs and in later stages also herbaceous plants.

The species occurs in a wide range of habitats, from open forests, scrubland, downs, gardens, and parkland to shrub-rich open country. The habitats can be dry or wet, cool, or warm.
