= List of moths of Botswana =

Location of Botswana

Botswana moths represent about 115 known moth species. The moths (mostly nocturnal) and butterflies (mostly diurnal) together make up the taxonomic order Lepidoptera.

This is a list of moth species which have been recorded in Botswana.

== Arctiidae ==
- Acantharctia vittata Aurivillius, 1900
- Metarctia lateritia Herrich-Schäffer, 1855
- Micralarctia punctulatum (Wallengren, 1860)
- Paralacydes destrictus Kühne, 2010
- Paralacydes jeskei (Grünberg, 1911)
- Teracotona rhodophaea (Walker, 1865)

== Cossidae ==
- Aethalopteryx atrireta (Hampson, 1910)

== Crambidae ==
- Ischnurges lancinalis (Guenée, 1854)

== Geometridae ==
- Chiasmia diarmodia (Prout, 1925)
- Chiasmia punctilinea (Prout, 1917)
- Drepanogynis cambogiaria (Guenée, 1858)
- Drepanogynis tripartita (Warren, 1898)
- Isturgia deerraria (Walker, 1861)
- Melinoessa aemonia (Swinhoe, 1904)
- Rhodophthitus atacta Prout, 1922
- Zamarada ascaphes Prout, 1925
- Zamarada deceptrix Warren, 1914
- Zamarada ilma Prout, 1922
- Zamarada pulverosa Warren, 1895
- Zeuctoboarmia sabinei (Prout, 1915)

== Gracillariidae ==
- Phyllonorycter anchistea (Vári, 1961)
- Phyllonorycter grewiella (Vári, 1961)

== Lasiocampidae ==
- Pachytrina verba Zolotuhin & Gurkovich, 2009

== Limacodidae ==
- Crothaema sericea Butler, 1880

== Lymantriidae ==
- Rhypopteryx lugardi (Swinhoe, 1903)

== Metarbelidae ==
- Arbelodes sebelensis Lehmann, 2010
- Kroonia fumealis (Janse, 1925)

== Noctuidae ==
- Achaea catella Guenée, 1852
- Acontia antica Walker, 1862
- Acontia aurelia Hacker, Legrain & Fibiger, 2008
- Acontia bechuana Hacker, Legrain & Fibiger, 2010
- Acontia chrysoproctis (Hampson, 1902)
- Acontia conifrons (Aurivillius, 1879)
- Acontia discoidea Hopffer, 1857
- Acontia dispar (Walker, [1858])
- Acontia dorothea Hacker, Legrain & Fibiger, 2008
- Acontia gratiosa Wallengren, 1856
- Acontia insocia (Walker, 1857)
- Acontia melaphora (Hampson, 1910)
- Acontia natalis (Guenée, 1852)
- Acontia porphyrea (Butler, 1898)
- Acontia simo Wallengren, 1860
- Acontia transfigurata Wallengren, 1856
- Acontia trimaculata Aurivillius, 1879
- Acontia wahlbergi Wallengren, 1856
- Adisura straminea Hampson, 1902
- Amyna punctum (Fabricius, 1794)
- Anedhella rectiradiata (Hampson, 1902)
- Asplenia melanodonta (Hampson, 1896)
- Athetis albirena (Hampson, 1902)
- Athetis melanephra Hampson, 1909
- Athetis singula (Möschler, 1883)
- Audea humeralis Hampson, 1902
- Audea melanoplaga Hampson, 1902
- Autoba admota (Felder & Rogenhofer, 1874)
- Brevipecten wolframmeyi Hacker & Fibiger, 2007
- Catamecia connectens (Hampson, 1902)
- Cerocala vermiculosa Herrich-Schäffer, [1858]
- Chalciope delta (Boisduval, 1833)
- Chrysodeixis acuta (Walker, [1858])
- Cretonia ethiopica Hampson, 1910
- Ctenusa pallida (Hampson, 1902)
- Ctenusa varians (Wallengren, 1863)
- Cyclopera bucephalidia (Hampson, 1902)
- Cyligramma latona (Cramer, 1775)
- Eublemma rivula (Moore, 1882)
- Euphiusa harmonica (Hampson, 1902)
- Eutelia polychorda Hampson, 1902
- Feliniopsis hosplitoides (Laporte, 1979)
- Grammodes geometrica (Fabricius, 1775)
- Grammodes stolida (Fabricius, 1775)
- Heteropalpia vetusta (Walker, 1865)
- Hypopyra carneotincta (Hampson, 1913)
- Masalia galatheae (Wallengren, 1856)
- Masalia leucosticta (Hampson, 1902)
- Namangana adela (Hampson, 1902)
- Ozarba consanguis (Hampson, 1902)
- Ozarba subterminalis Hampson, 1910
- Paracroria griseotincta (Hampson, 1902)
- Pericyma atrifusa (Hampson, 1902)
- Plecopterodes moderata (Wallengren, 1860)
- Thiacidas duplicata (Grünberg, 1910)
- Thiacidas fasciata (Fawcett, 1917)
- Ulotrichopus primulina (Hampson, 1902)
- Ulotrichopus tinctipennis (Hampson, 1902)

== Nolidae ==
- Arcyophora longivalvis Guenée, 1852
- Arcyophora stalii (Wallengren, 1863)
- Blenina squamifera (Wallengren, 1860)
- Negeta luminosa (Walker, 1858)
- Risoba diplogramma Hampson, 1912

== Notodontidae ==
- Antheua aurifodinae (Distant, 1902)

== Pterophoridae ==
- Agdistis clara Arenberger, 1986

== Pyralidae ==
- Pempelia morosalis (Saalmüller, 1880)

== Saturniidae ==
- Campimoptilum kuntzei (Dewitz, 1881)
- Epiphora mythimnia (Westwood, 1849)
- Gynanisa maja (Klug, 1836)
- Heniocha marnois (Rogenhofer, 1891)
- Pseudaphelia apollinaris (Boisduval, 1847)

== Sesiidae ==
- Anaudia felderi Wallengren, 1863

== Sphingidae ==
- Polyptychoides grayii (Walker, 1856)
- Praedora leucophaea Rothschild & Jordan, 1903
- Rufoclanis numosae (Wallengren, 1860)
- Xenosphingia jansei Jordan, 1920

== Thyrididae ==
- Arniocera erythropyga (Wallengren, 1860)

== Tineidae ==
- Ceratophaga tragoptila (Meyrick, 1917)
- Monopis lamprostola Meyrick, 1918

== Tortricidae ==
- Paraeccopsis insellata (Meyrick, 1920)

== Xyloryctidae ==
- Scythris pangalactis Meyrick, 1933
