= Hypopyra pallidigera =

Scientific classification
- Kingdom: Animalia
- Phylum: Arthropoda
- Clade: Pancrustacea
- Class: Insecta
- Order: Lepidoptera
- Superfamily: Noctuoidea
- Family: Erebidae
- Genus: Hypopyra
- Species: H. pallidigera

Binomial name
- Hypopyra pallidigera Holloway, 2005

Species of moth

Hypopyra pallidigera is a moth of the family Erebidae. It is found on Borneo and Sumatra. The habitat consists of lowland dipterocarp forests.

The wingspan is about 35 mm for males and 38 mm for females. Adults are similar to Hypopyra ossigera, but has a paler, fawn ground colour with faintly darker blackish brown fasciation.
