= Adisura bella =

Scientific classification
- Kingdom: Animalia
- Phylum: Arthropoda
- Class: Insecta
- Order: Lepidoptera
- Superfamily: Noctuoidea
- Family: Noctuidae
- Genus: Adisura
- Species: A. bella

Binomial name
- Adisura bella Gaede, 1915

Species of moth

Adisura bella is a species of moth of the family Noctuidae first described by Max Gaede in 1915. It is found in Africa, including South Africa, Somalia, Tanzania and Saudi Arabia

This species has a wingspan of 25 millimetres (0.98 in) and resembles Adisura atkinsoni, from which it can be distinguished by the different distribution of the pink colour and the yellow-brownish edge of the hindwings, that is black at A. atkinsoni.
