= Adisura marginalis =

Scientific classification
- Kingdom: Animalia
- Phylum: Arthropoda
- Class: Insecta
- Order: Lepidoptera
- Superfamily: Noctuoidea
- Family: Noctuidae
- Genus: Adisura
- Species: A. marginalis

Binomial name
- Adisura marginalis (Walker, 1858)

Synonyms
- Anthophila marginalis Walker, 1858; Heliothis delicia Felder & Rogenhofer, 1874; Adisura dulcis Moore, 1881; Adisura similis Moore, 1881; Anthophila similis (Moore, 1881); Adisura purgata Warren, 1913

Species of moth

Adisura marginalis (new pod borer) is a species of moth of the family Noctuidae. It is found in Myanmar, India, Malaysia, the Philippines, Thailand, Vietnam and Indonesia, as well as the Northern Territory, Queensland and Western Australia in Australia.

The larvae feed on Cajanus cajan.
