= Hypopyra rufescens =

Scientific classification
- Domain: Eukaryota
- Kingdom: Animalia
- Phylum: Arthropoda
- Class: Insecta
- Order: Lepidoptera
- Superfamily: Noctuoidea
- Family: Erebidae
- Genus: Hypopyra
- Species: H. rufescens

Binomial name
- Hypopyra rufescens (Kirby, 1896)

Synonyms
- Pyramarista rufescens Kirby, 1896

Species of moth

Hypopyra rufescens is a moth of the family Erebidae. It is found in Kenya, Malawi and Zambia.
