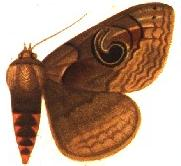
- Female
- Male

Scientific classification
- Domain: Eukaryota
- Kingdom: Animalia
- Phylum: Arthropoda
- Class: Insecta
- Order: Lepidoptera
- Superfamily: Noctuoidea
- Family: Erebidae
- Genus: Hypopyra
- Species: H. malgassica

Binomial name
- Hypopyra malgassica Mabille, 1878

Synonyms
- Enmonodia malgassica

= Hypopyra malgassica =

Species of moth

Hypopyra malgassica is a moth of the family Erebidae first described by Paul Mabille in 1878. This moth species is commonly found in Madagascar.
