= Paralacydes bivittata =

Scientific classification
- Domain: Eukaryota
- Kingdom: Animalia
- Phylum: Arthropoda
- Class: Insecta
- Order: Lepidoptera
- Superfamily: Noctuoidea
- Family: Erebidae
- Subfamily: Arctiinae
- Genus: Paralacydes
- Species: P. bivittata

Binomial name
- Paralacydes bivittata (Bartel, 1903)

Synonyms
- Spilosoma bivittata Bartel, 1903; Spilosoma fuscovenata Bartel, 1903

Species of moth

Paralacydes bivittata is a moth of the family Erebidae. It was described by Max Bartel in 1903. It is found in the Democratic Republic of the Congo, Kenya and Tanzania.
