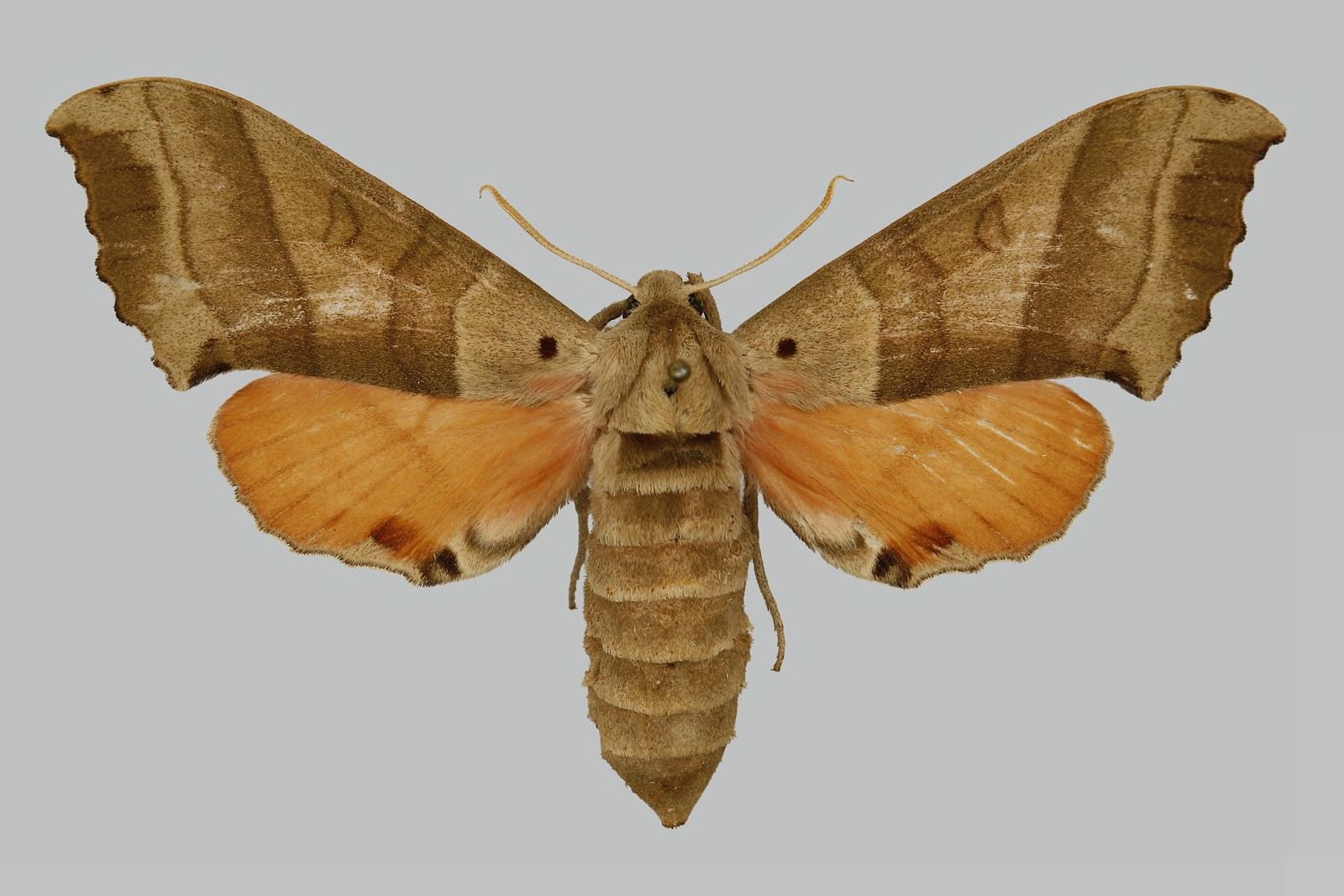

Scientific classification
- Domain: Eukaryota
- Kingdom: Animalia
- Phylum: Arthropoda
- Class: Insecta
- Order: Lepidoptera
- Family: Sphingidae
- Genus: Rufoclanis
- Species: R. rosea

Binomial name
- Rufoclanis rosea (H. Druce, 1882)

Synonyms
- Polyptychus orientalis Clark, 1936; Rufoclanis rosea meloui Oberthür, 1913; Triptogon reducta Karsch, 1891; Triptogon rosea H. Druce, 1882

= Rufoclanis rosea =

Species of moth

Rufoclanis rosea is a moth of the family Sphingidae first described by Herbert Druce in 1882. It is known from forests in Burkina Faso, Ghana, Cameroon, Gabon, the Central African Republic, Tanzania and Uganda.

The length of the forewings is 30–32 mm for males.
