= Hypopyra padanga =

Scientific classification
- Domain: Eukaryota
- Kingdom: Animalia
- Phylum: Arthropoda
- Class: Insecta
- Order: Lepidoptera
- Superfamily: Noctuoidea
- Family: Erebidae
- Genus: Hypopyra
- Species: H. padanga

Binomial name
- Hypopyra padanga (C. Swinhoe, 1918)

Synonyms
- Enmonodia padanga C. Swinhoe, 1918

Species of moth

Hypopyra padanga is a moth of the family Erebidae first described by Charles Swinhoe in 1918. It is found on Sumatra in Indonesia.
