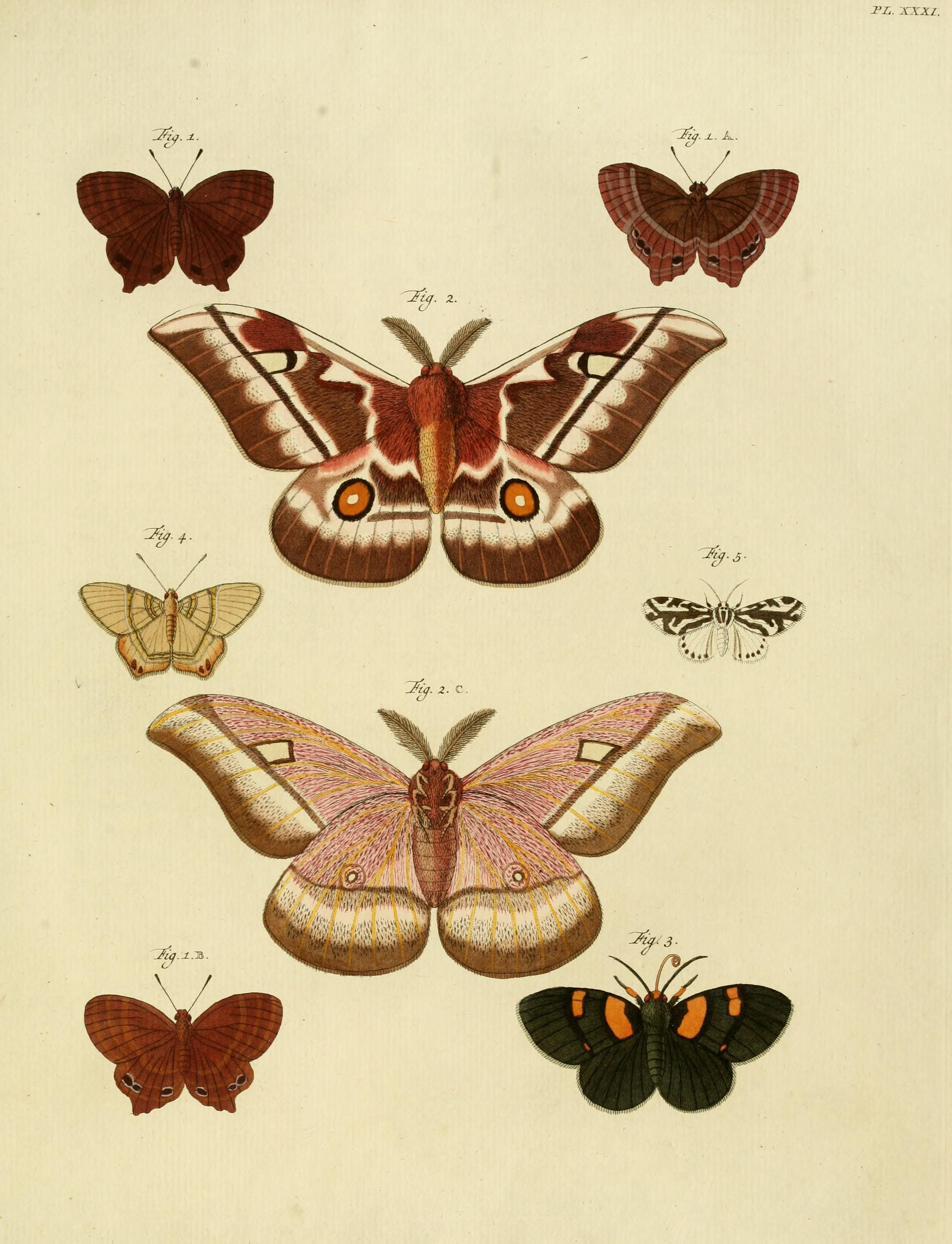
- Various african moths

Scientific classification
- Domain: Eukaryota
- Kingdom: Animalia
- Phylum: Arthropoda
- Class: Insecta
- Order: Lepidoptera
- Superfamily: Noctuoidea
- Family: Erebidae
- Subfamily: Arctiinae
- Genus: Paralacydes
- Species: P. vocula

Binomial name
- Paralacydes vocula (Stoll, 1790)

Synonyms
- Bombyx vocula Stoll, 1790

= Paralacydes vocula =

Species of moth

Paralacydes vocula is a moth of the family Erebidae. It was described by Stoll in 1790. It is found in South Africa and Tanzania.
