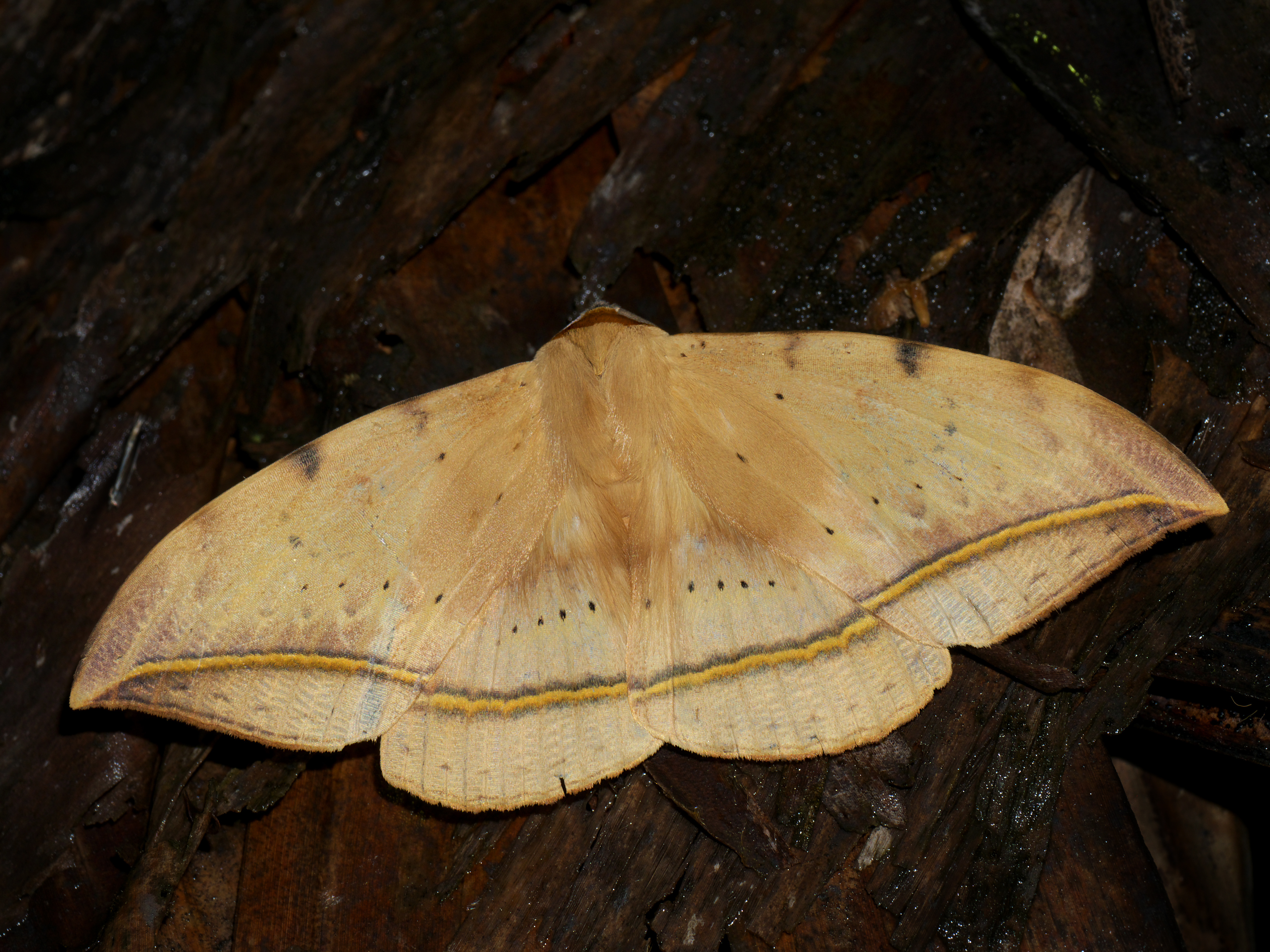

Scientific classification
- Domain: Eukaryota
- Kingdom: Animalia
- Phylum: Arthropoda
- Class: Insecta
- Order: Lepidoptera
- Superfamily: Noctuoidea
- Family: Erebidae
- Genus: Hypopyra
- Species: H. megalesia

Binomial name
- Hypopyra megalesia Mabille, 1879

Synonyms
- Hypopyra bosei Saalmuller, 1880

= Hypopyra megalesia =

Species of moth

Hypopyra megalesia is a moth of the family Erebidae. It is found in Madagascar.
