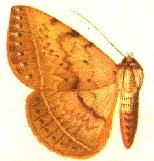
- Female
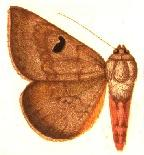
- Male

Scientific classification
- Kingdom: Animalia
- Phylum: Arthropoda
- Class: Insecta
- Order: Lepidoptera
- Superfamily: Noctuoidea
- Family: Erebidae
- Genus: Hypopyra
- Species: H. burmanica

Binomial name
- Hypopyra burmanica (Hampson, 1913)

Synonyms
- Enmonodia burmanica Hampson, 1913

= Hypopyra burmanica =

Species of moth

Hypopyra burmanica is a moth of the family Erebidae first described by George Hampson in 1913. It is found in Myanmar.
