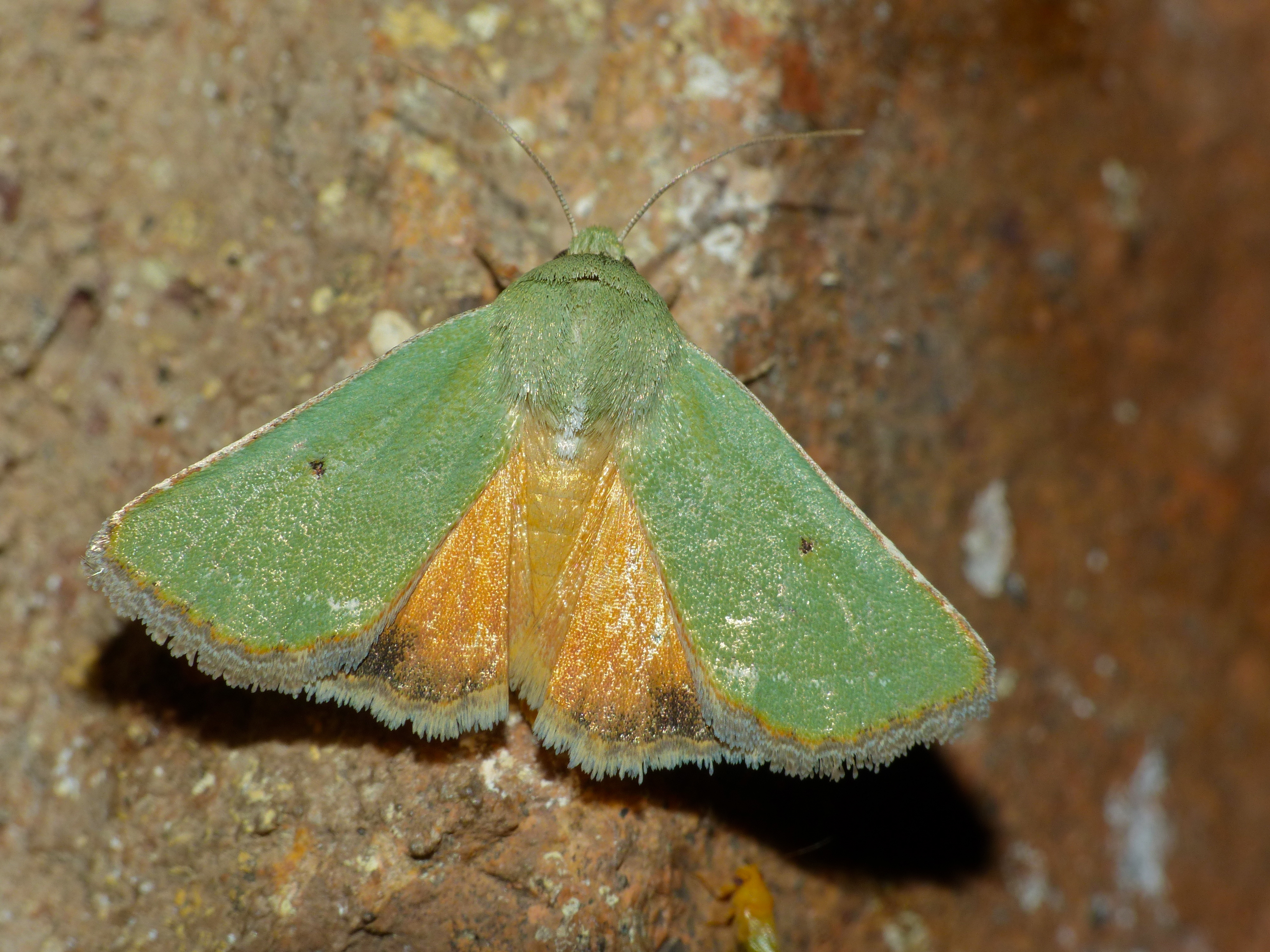

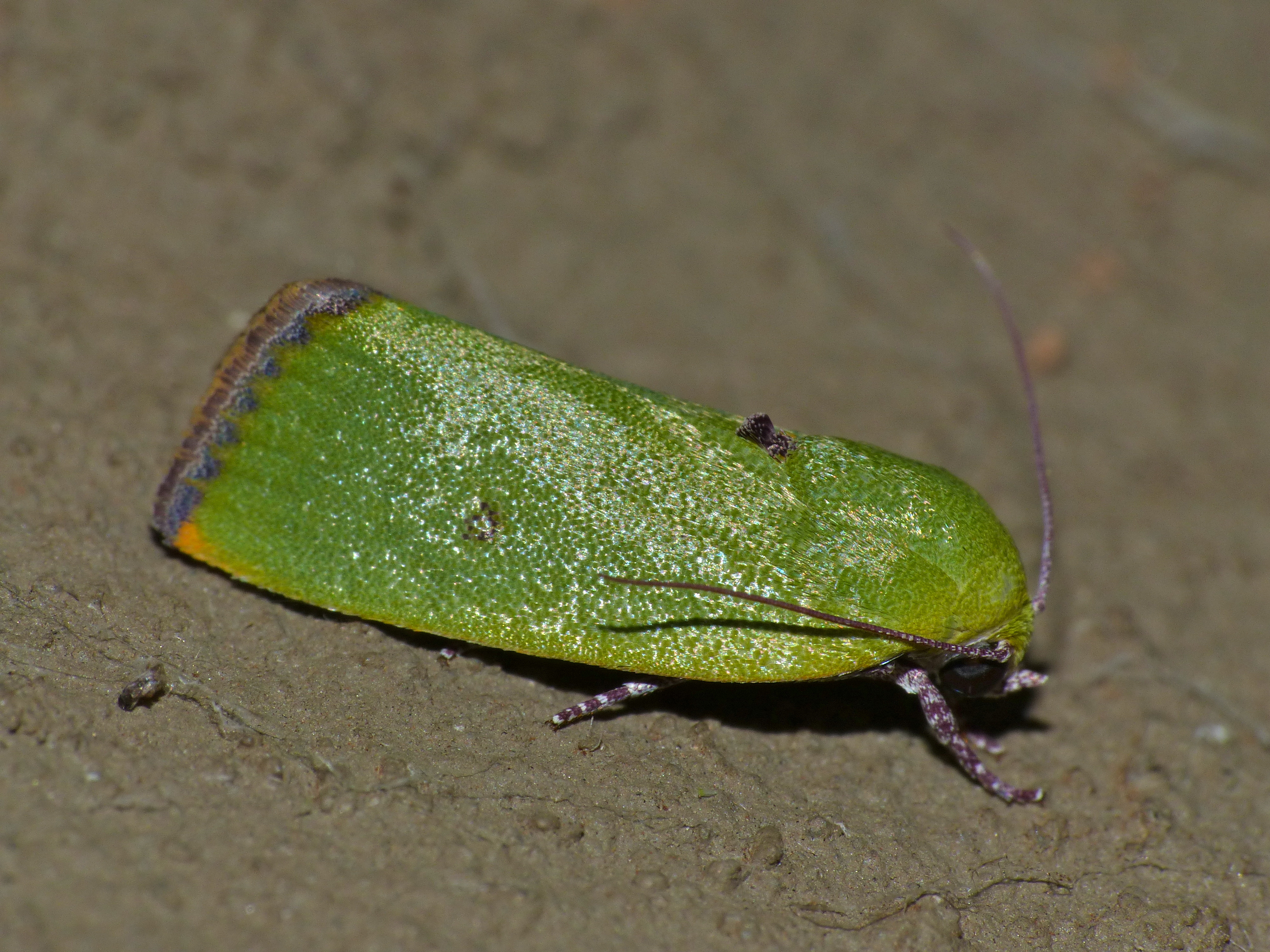

Scientific classification
- Domain: Eukaryota
- Kingdom: Animalia
- Phylum: Arthropoda
- Class: Insecta
- Order: Lepidoptera
- Superfamily: Noctuoidea
- Family: Noctuidae
- Genus: Adisura
- Species: A. aerugo

Binomial name
- Adisura aerugo (Felder & Rogenhofer, 1874)

Synonyms
- Thalpochares aerugo Felder & Rogenhofer, 1874

= Adisura aerugo =

Verdant adisura

Species of moth

Adisura aerugo, the verdant adisura, is a moth of the family Noctuidae. The species was first described by Felder and Rogenhofer in 1874. It is found in the Cape Province, Lesotho, KwaZulu-Natal, Transvaal, Zimbabwe and Botswana.

Its forewings are green, and its hindwings are yellow brownish.

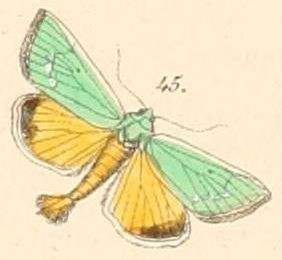
In Felder & Rogenhofer (1875)
