= Hypopyra feniseca =

Scientific classification
- Domain: Eukaryota
- Kingdom: Animalia
- Phylum: Arthropoda
- Class: Insecta
- Order: Lepidoptera
- Superfamily: Noctuoidea
- Family: Erebidae
- Genus: Hypopyra
- Species: H. feniseca

Binomial name
- Hypopyra feniseca Guenée, 1852

Species of moth

Hypopyra feniseca is a moth of the family Erebidae. It is found in China, India (West Bengal), Bangladesh, Nepal, Thailand and Vietnam.
