= Hypopyra contractipennis =

Scientific classification
- Domain: Eukaryota
- Kingdom: Animalia
- Phylum: Arthropoda
- Class: Insecta
- Order: Lepidoptera
- Superfamily: Noctuoidea
- Family: Erebidae
- Genus: Hypopyra
- Species: H. contractipennis

Binomial name
- Hypopyra contractipennis (de Joannis, 1912)

Synonyms
- Enmonodia contractipennis de Joannis, 1912

Species of moth

Hypopyra contractipennis is a species of moth of the family Erebidae. It is found in northern Vietnam and in Laos.

This species has a wingspan of 50 mm.
