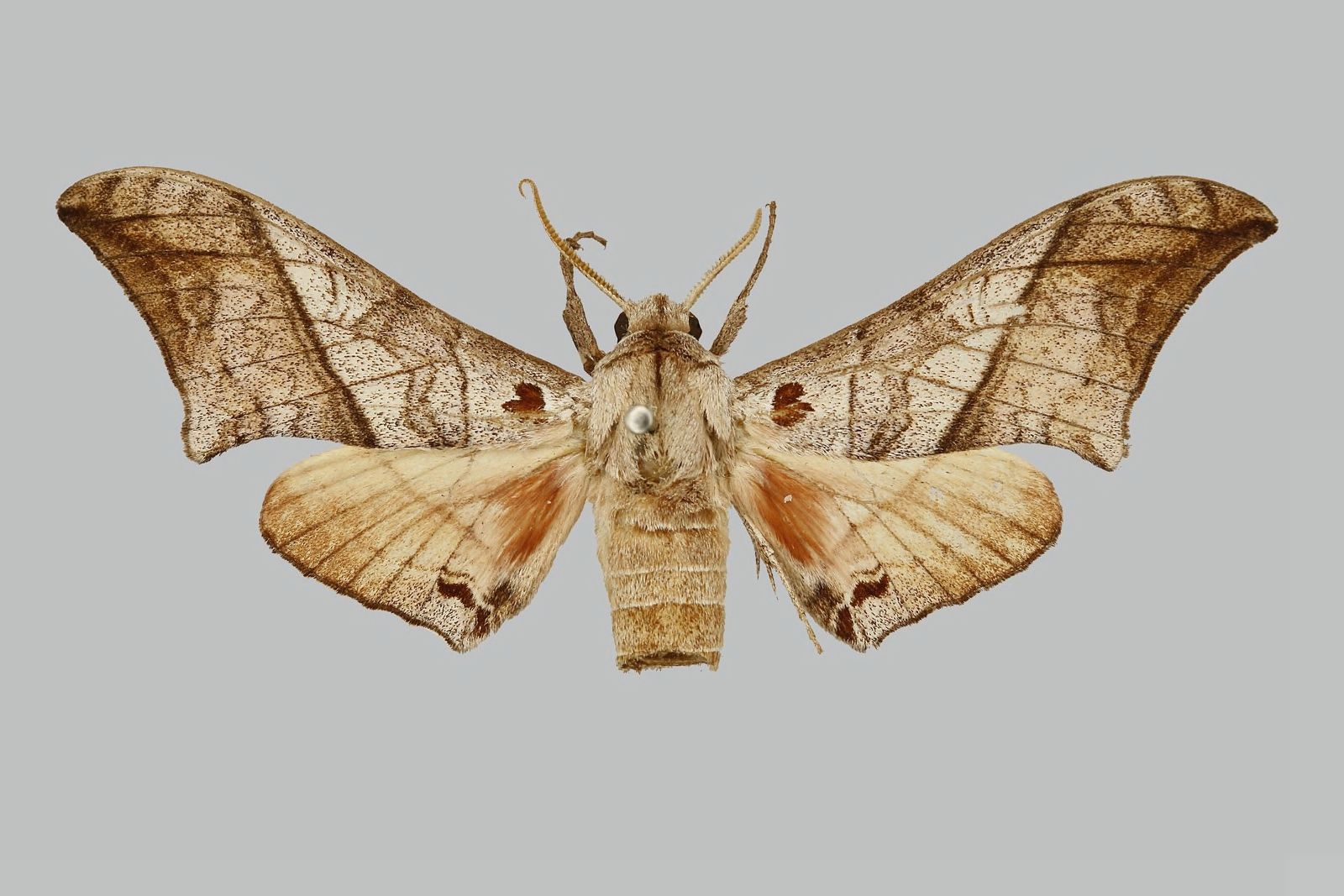

Scientific classification
- Kingdom: Animalia
- Phylum: Arthropoda
- Class: Insecta
- Order: Lepidoptera
- Family: Sphingidae
- Genus: Rufoclanis
- Species: R. maccleeryi

Binomial name
- Rufoclanis maccleeryi Carcasson, 1968

= Rufoclanis maccleeryi =

Species of moth

Rufoclanis maccleeryi is a moth of the family Sphingidae. It is known from Tanzania and Kenya.

The length of the forewings is 32 mm.
