= Hypopyra allardi =

Scientific classification
- Domain: Eukaryota
- Kingdom: Animalia
- Phylum: Arthropoda
- Class: Insecta
- Order: Lepidoptera
- Superfamily: Noctuoidea
- Family: Erebidae
- Genus: Hypopyra
- Species: H. allardi

Binomial name
- Hypopyra allardi (Oberthür, 1878)

Synonyms
- Ophiusa allardi Oberthür, 1878; Ophisma leucochiton Mabille, 1884

Species of moth

Hypopyra allardi is a moth of the family Erebidae. It is found in the Democratic Republic of Congo, Ghana, Madagascar, Sierra Leone and Tanzania (Zanzibar).
