= Hypopyra meridionalis =

Scientific classification
- Kingdom: Animalia
- Phylum: Arthropoda
- Class: Insecta
- Order: Lepidoptera
- Superfamily: Noctuoidea
- Family: Erebidae
- Genus: Hypopyra
- Species: H. meridionalis

Binomial name
- Hypopyra meridionalis (Hampson, 1913)

Synonyms
- Enmonodia meridionalis Hampson, 1913

Species of moth

Hypopyra meridionalis is a moth of the family Erebidae. It is found in Sri Lanka.
