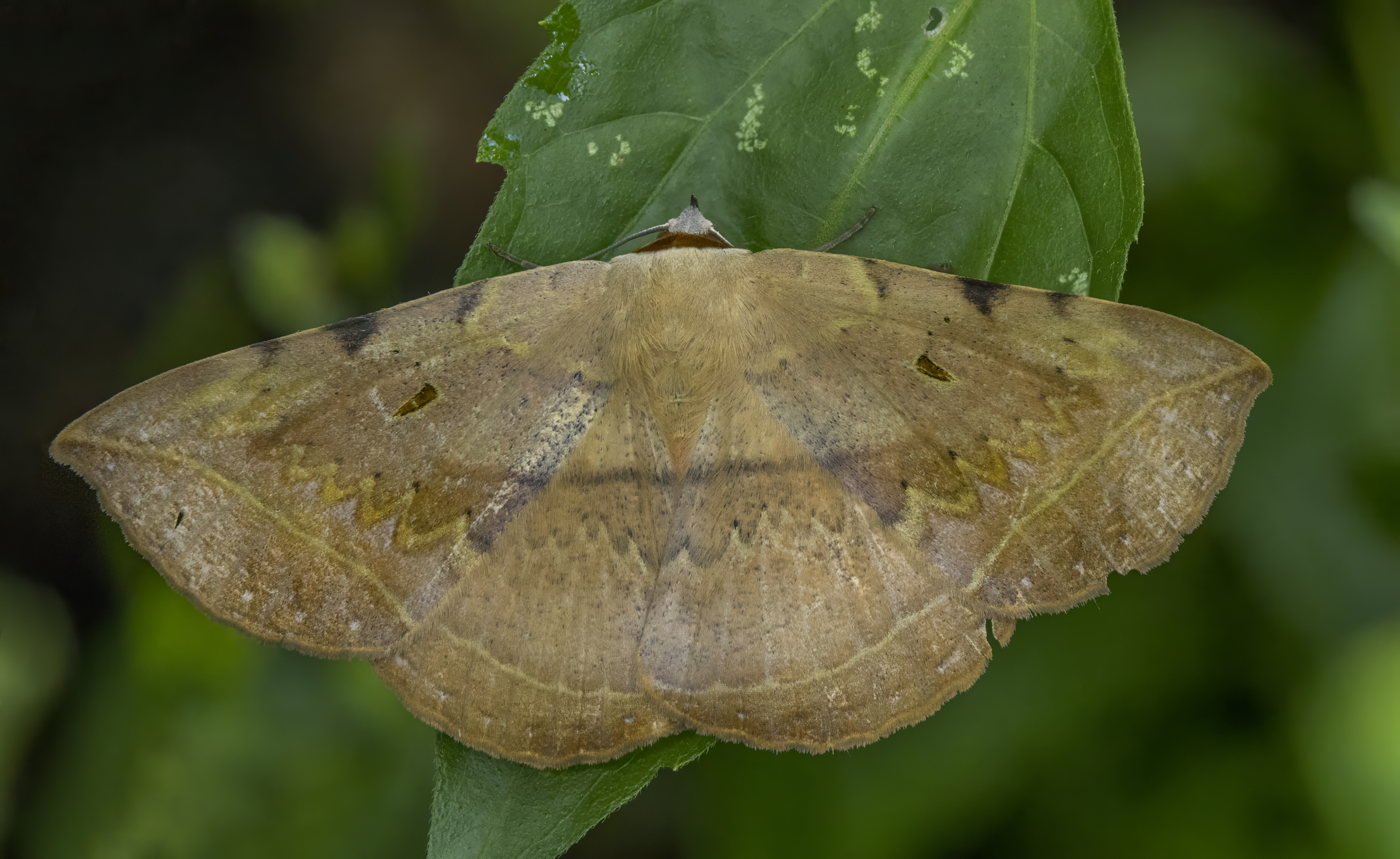
- male in Ghana

Scientific classification
- Domain: Eukaryota
- Kingdom: Animalia
- Phylum: Arthropoda
- Class: Insecta
- Order: Lepidoptera
- Superfamily: Noctuoidea
- Family: Erebidae
- Genus: Hypopyra
- Species: H. capensis

Binomial name
- Hypopyra capensis Herrich-Schäffer, 1854

Synonyms
- Hypopyra endoxantha (Hampson, 1913); Enmonodia endoxantha Hampson, 1913; Hypopyra hampsoni (Aurivillius, 1925); Enmonodia hampsoni Aurivillius, 1925; Hypopyra lunifera (Aurivillius, 1925); Hypopyra occidentalis (Hampson, 1913); Enmonodia occidentalis Hampson, 1913; Hypopyra plumbefusa (Hampson, 1913); Enmonodia plumbefusa Hampson, 1913; Hypopyra pulverulenta (Hampson, 1913); Enmonodia pulverulenta Hampson, 1913

= Hypopyra capensis =

Species of moth

Hypopyra capensis is a moth of the family Erebidae first described by Gottlieb August Wilhelm Herrich-Schäffer in 1854. This moth species is commonly found in Africa, ranging from Sierra Leone, South Africa, Zaire, Eswatini to Zambia.

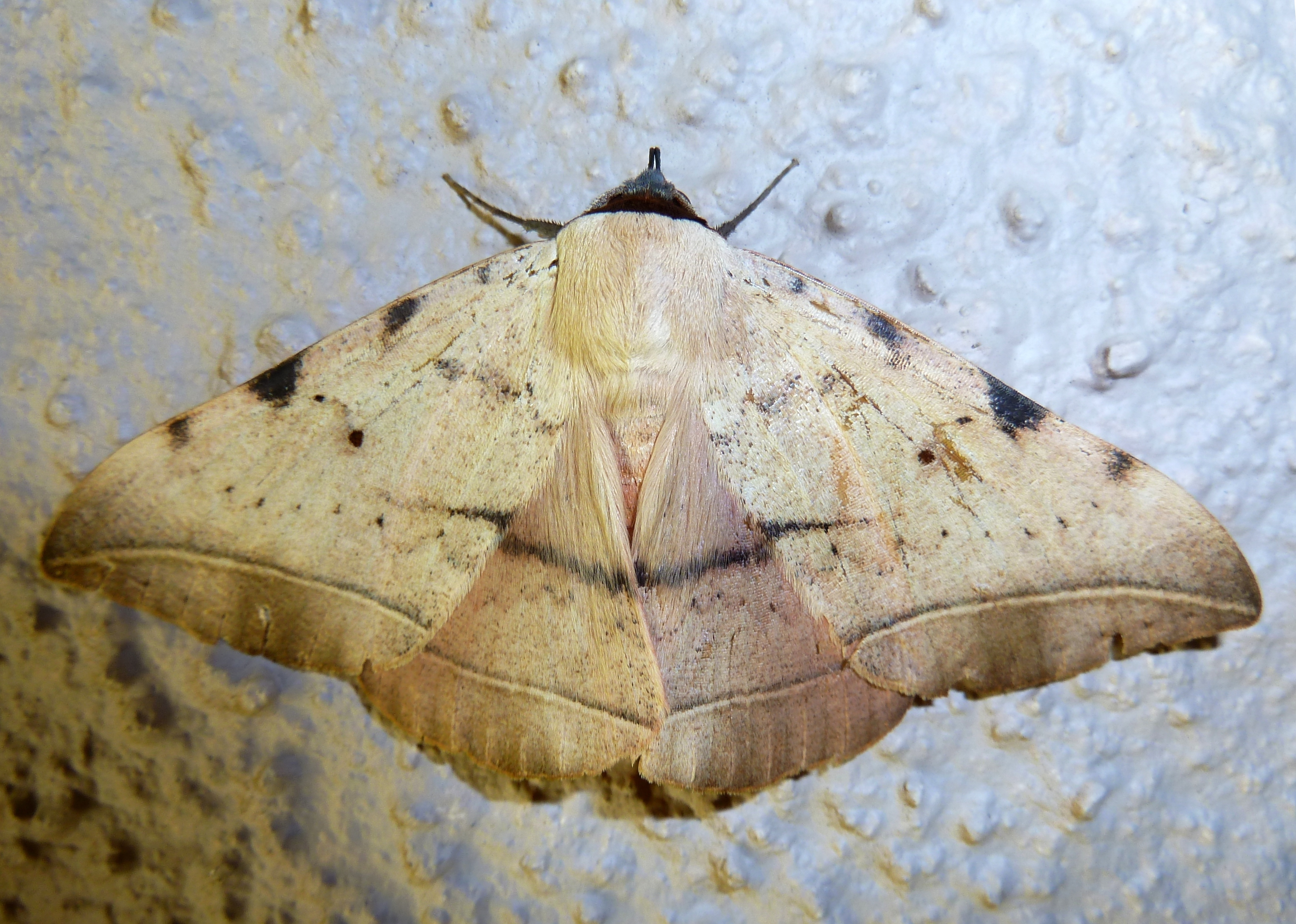
In South Africa

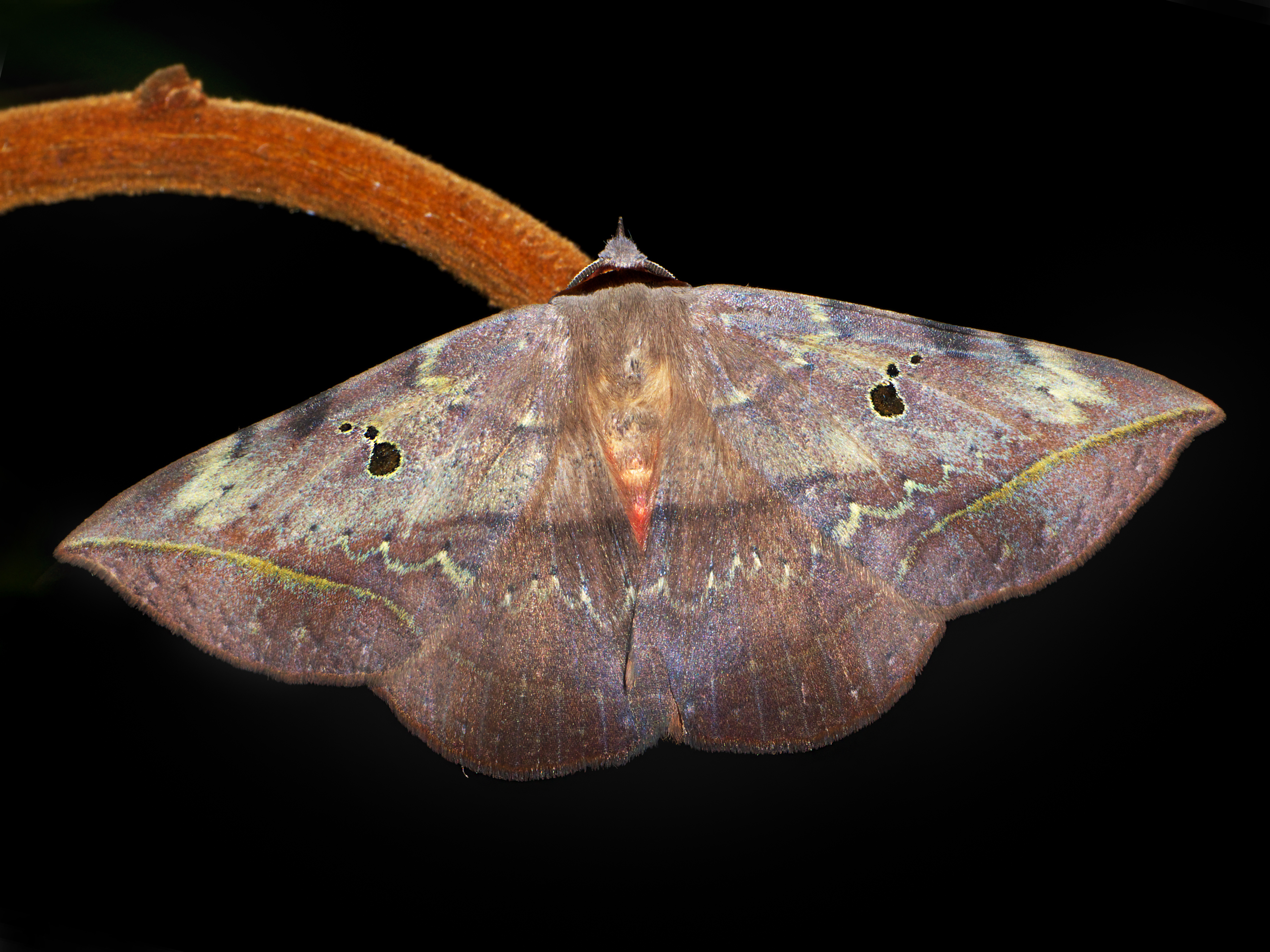
In Madagascar
