= Hypopyra configurans =

Scientific classification
- Kingdom: Animalia
- Phylum: Arthropoda
- Class: Insecta
- Order: Lepidoptera
- Superfamily: Noctuoidea
- Family: Erebidae
- Genus: Hypopyra
- Species: H. configurans

Binomial name
- Hypopyra configurans Walker, 1858

Synonyms
- Hypopyra convigurans

Species of moth

Hypopyra configurans is a moth of the family Erebidae. It is found in Brazil (Amazonas).
