= Hypopyra ossigeroides =

Scientific classification
- Kingdom: Animalia
- Phylum: Arthropoda
- Clade: Pancrustacea
- Class: Insecta
- Order: Lepidoptera
- Superfamily: Noctuoidea
- Family: Erebidae
- Genus: Hypopyra
- Species: H. ossigeroides

Binomial name
- Hypopyra ossigeroides Holloway, 2005

Species of moth

Hypopyra ossigeroides is a moth of the family Erebidae. It is found on Borneo and Sumatra. The habitat consists of montane forests.

The wingspan is 38–43 mm.
