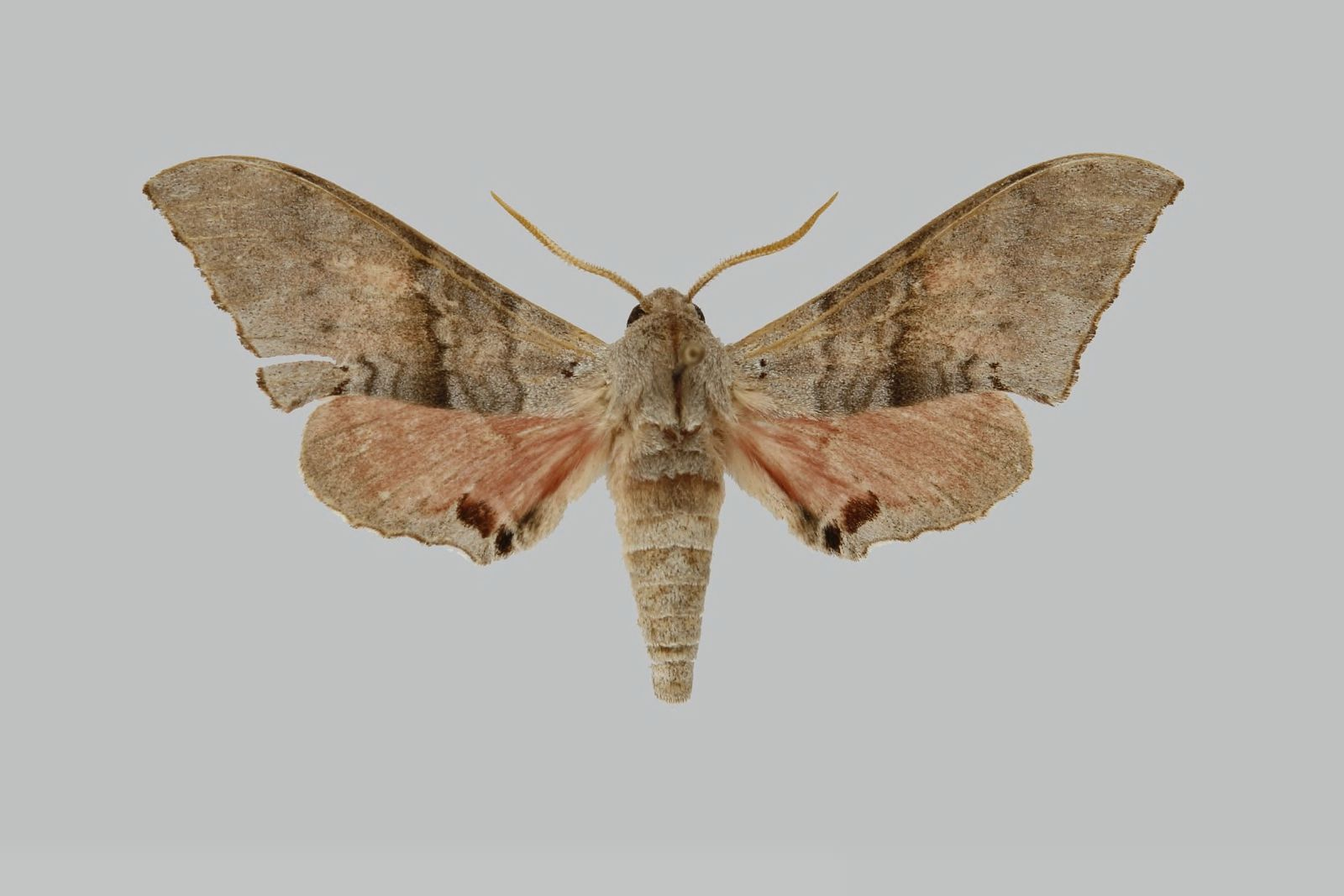

Scientific classification
- Domain: Eukaryota
- Kingdom: Animalia
- Phylum: Arthropoda
- Class: Insecta
- Order: Lepidoptera
- Family: Sphingidae
- Genus: Rufoclanis
- Species: R. jansei

Binomial name
- Rufoclanis jansei (Vari, 1964)

Synonyms
- Polyptychus jansei Vari, 1964

= Rufoclanis jansei =

Species of moth

Rufoclanis jansei is a moth of the family Sphingidae. It is known from South Africa, Zimbabwe and Tanzania.
