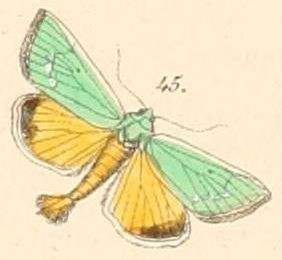
- Adisura aerugo

Scientific classification
- Domain: Eukaryota
- Kingdom: Animalia
- Phylum: Arthropoda
- Class: Insecta
- Order: Lepidoptera
- Superfamily: Noctuoidea
- Family: Noctuidae
- Subfamily: Heliothinae
- Genus: Adisura; Moore, 1881

Synonyms
- Astonycha Turner, 1920

= Adisura =

Genus of moths

For historical/ mythological figure in Bengal, see Adi Sura

Adisura is a genus of moths of the family Noctuidae. Species are found thoroughout India and Sri Lanka, Africa and some far East Asian countries. Differs from Pyrrhia species in having sparsely spined mid and hind tibia and thorax without sharp crest.

== Species ==
- Adisura aerugo (Felder and Rogenhofer, 1874)
- Adisura affinis Rothschild, 1921
- Adisura atkinsoni Moore, 1881
- Adisura bella Gaede, 1915
- Adisura callima Bethune-Baker, 1911
- Adisura goateri Hacker & Saldaitis, 2011
- Adisura litarga (Turner, 1920)
- Adisura malagassica Rothschild, 1924
- Adisura marginalis (Walker, 1858)
- Adisura straminea Hampson, 1902
