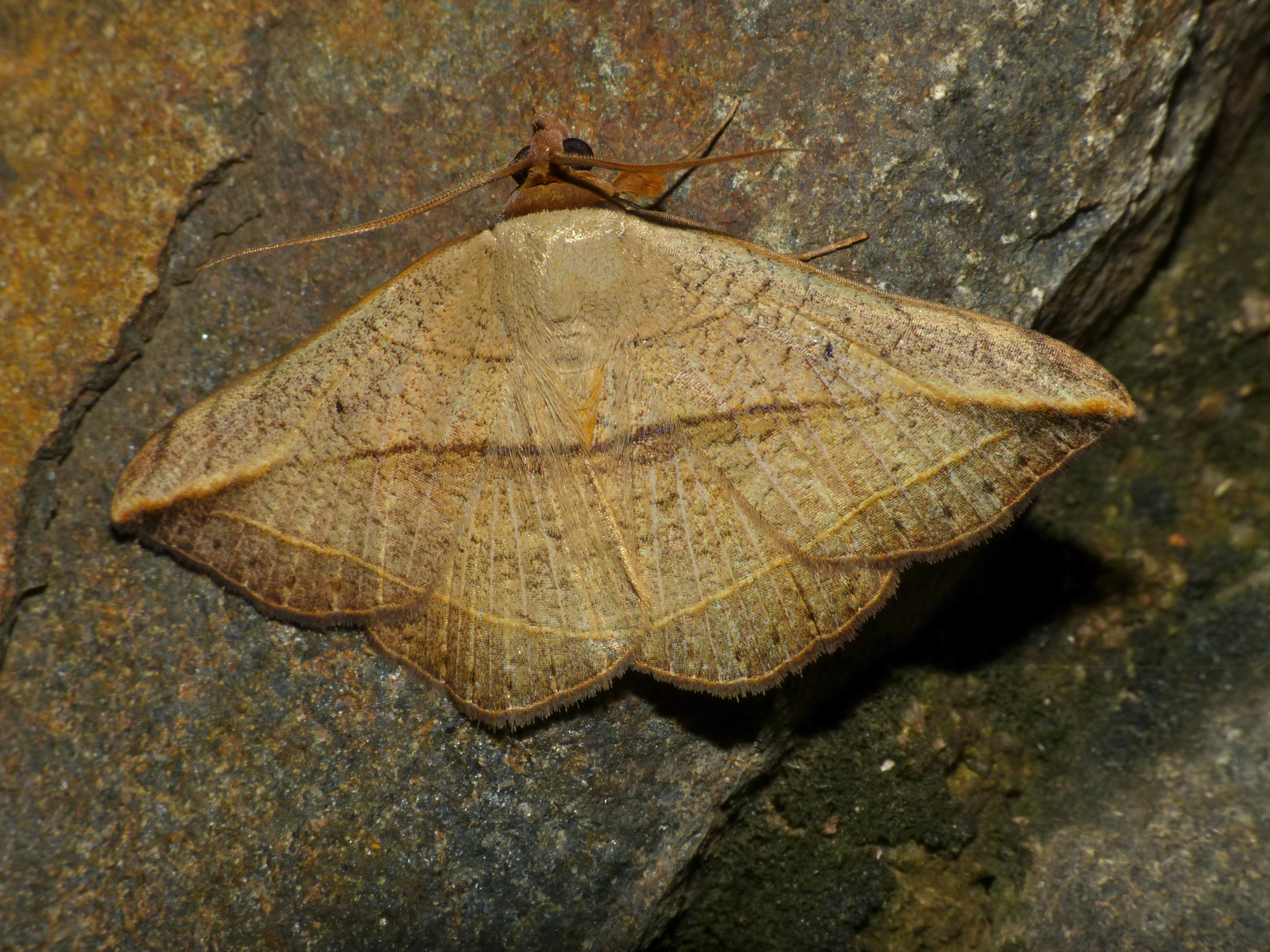

Scientific classification
- Domain: Eukaryota
- Kingdom: Animalia
- Phylum: Arthropoda
- Class: Insecta
- Order: Lepidoptera
- Superfamily: Noctuoidea
- Family: Erebidae
- Tribe: Hypopyrini
- Genus: Hypopyra; Guenee, 1852

Synonyms
- Enmonodia Walker, 1858; Maxula Walker, 1865; Pyramarista Kirby, 1896

= Hypopyra =

Genus of moths

Hypopyra is a genus of moths in the family Erebidae.

== Species ==
- Hypopyra africana (Kirby, 1896)
- Hypopyra allardi (Oberthür, 1878) (syn: Hypopyra leucochiton (Mabille, 1884))
- Hypopyra burmanica (Hampson, 1913)
- Hypopyra capensis Herrich-Schäffer, 1854
- Hypopyra carneotincta (Hampson, 1913)
- Hypopyra configurans Walker, 1858
- Hypopyra contractipennis (de Joannis, 1912)
- Hypopyra feniseca Guenée, 1852
- Hypopyra guttata Wallengren, 1856
- Hypopyra lactipex (Hampson, 1913)
- Hypopyra malgassica Mabille, 1878
- Hypopyra megalesia Mabille, 1879 (syn: Hypopyra bosei Saalmüller, 1880)
- Hypopyra meridionalis (Hampson, 1913)
- Hypopyra ochracea (Candeze, 1927)
- Hypopyra ossigera Guenée, 1852
- Hypopyra ossigeroides Holloway, 2005
- Hypopyra padanga (Swinhoe, 1918)
- Hypopyra pallidigera Holloway, 2005
- Hypopyra pudens Walker, 1858 (syn: Hypopyra grandaeva Felder and Rogenhofer, 1874, Hypopyra persimilis Moore, 1877)
- Hypopyra rufescens (Kirby, 1896)
- Hypopyra spermatophora (Hampson, 1913)
- Hypopyra unistrigata Guenée, 1852 (syn: Hypopyra idonea (Walker, 1865), Hypopyra poeusaria (Walker, 1860))
- Hypopyra vespertilio (Fabricius, 1787) (syn: Hypopyra distans Moore, 1882, Hypopyra dulcina Felder and Rogenhofer, 1874, Hypopyra extricans Walker, 1858, Hypopyra hypopyroides (Walker, 1858), Hypopyra hypopyroides (Walker, 1869), Hypopyra pallida Moore, 1883, Hypopyra pandia Felder and Rogenhofer, 1874, Hypopyra shiva Guenée, 1852, Hypopyra signata Walker, 1869)
- Hypopyra villicosta (L.B. Prout, 1919)
