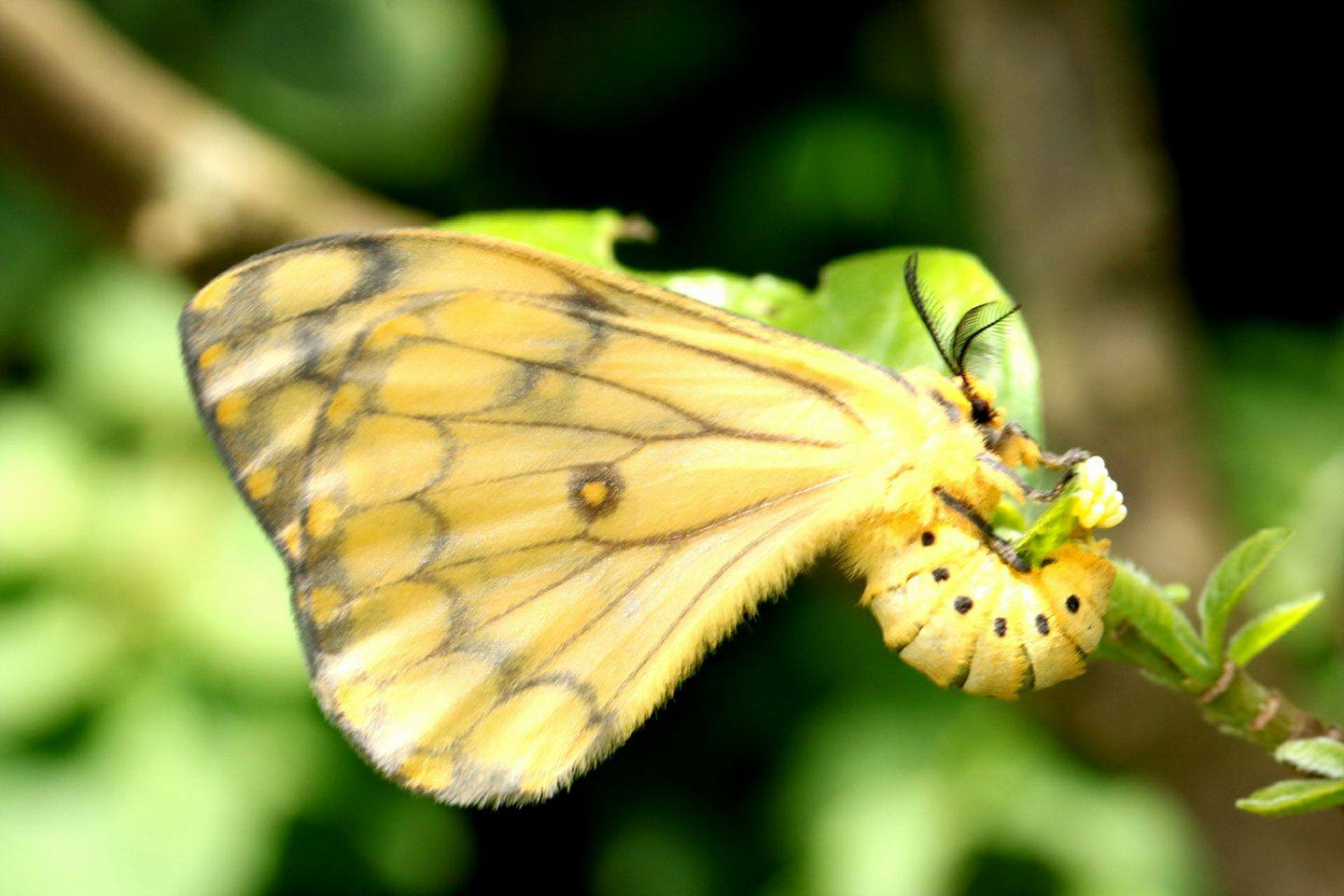
- Pseudaphelia_apollinaris

Scientific classification
- Kingdom: Animalia
- Phylum: Arthropoda
- Class: Insecta
- Order: Lepidoptera
- Family: Saturniidae
- Genus: Pseudaphelia; Kirby, 1892

Synonyms
- Aphelia Westwood, 1849 (Preocc.)

= Pseudaphelia =

Genus of moths

Pseudaphelia is a genus of moths in the family Saturniidae first described by William Forsell Kirby in 1892.

== Species ==
- Pseudaphelia ansorgei Rothschild, 1898
- Pseudaphelia apollinaris (Boisduval, 1847)
- Pseudaphelia dialitha Tams, 1930
- Pseudaphelia flava Bouvier, 1930
- Pseudaphelia flavomarginata Gaede, 1915
- Pseudaphelia karemii Bouvier, 1927
- Pseudaphelia luteola Bouvier, 1930
- Pseudaphelia roseibrunnea Gaede, 1927
- Pseudaphelia simplex Rebel, 1906
