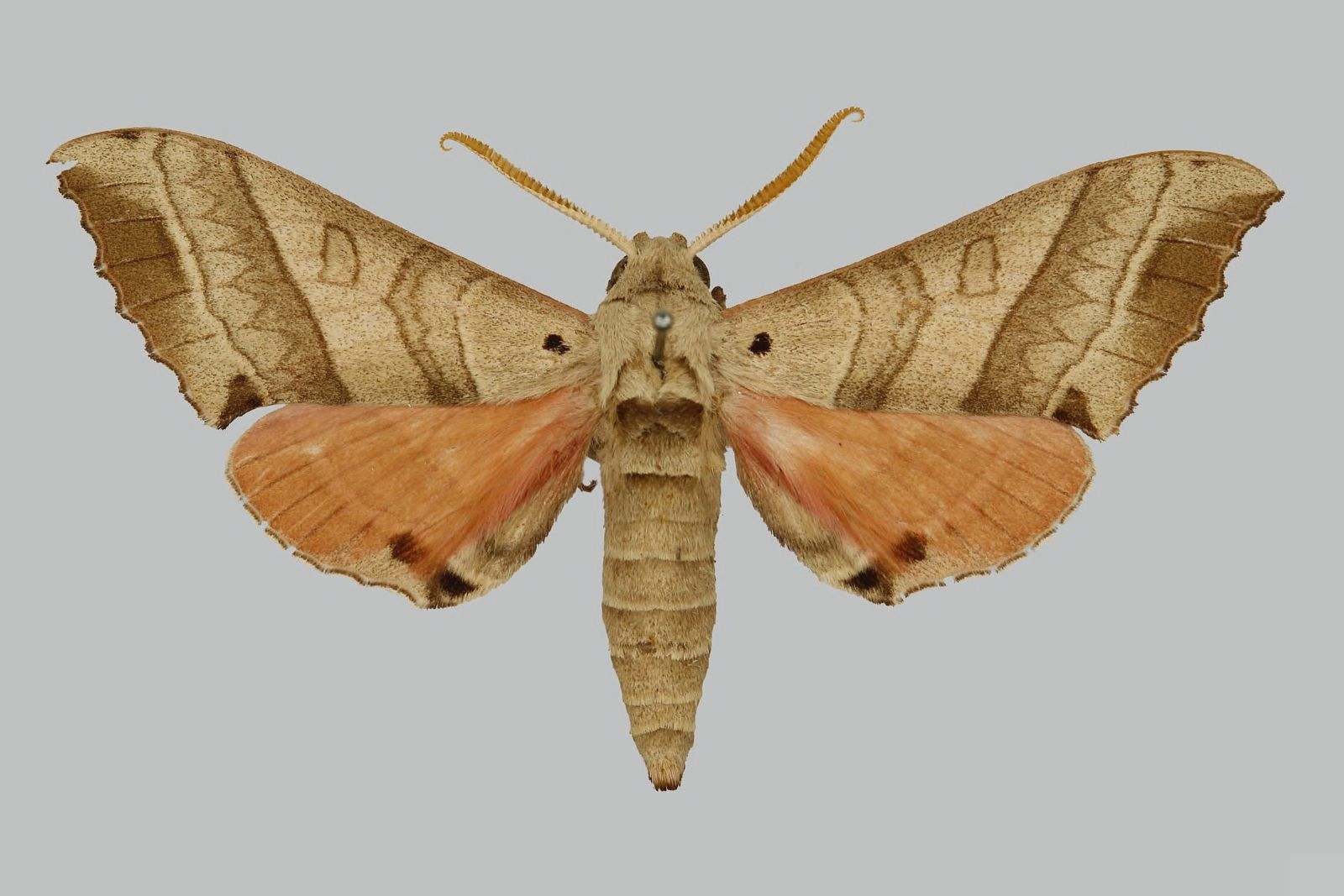
- Rufoclanis rosea

Scientific classification
- Domain: Eukaryota
- Kingdom: Animalia
- Phylum: Arthropoda
- Class: Insecta
- Order: Lepidoptera
- Family: Sphingidae
- Tribe: Smerinthini
- Genus: Rufoclanis; Carcasson, 1968

= Rufoclanis =

Genus of moths

Rufoclanis is a genus of moths in the family Sphingidae erected by Robert Herbert Carcasson in 1968.

== Species ==
- Rufoclanis erlangeri (Rothschild & Jordan, 1903)
- Rufoclanis fulgurans (Rothschild & Jordan, 1903)
- Rufoclanis jansei (Vari, 1964)
- Rufoclanis maccleeryi Carcasson, 1968
- Rufoclanis numosae (Wallengren, 1860)
- Rufoclanis rosea (Druce, 1882)
