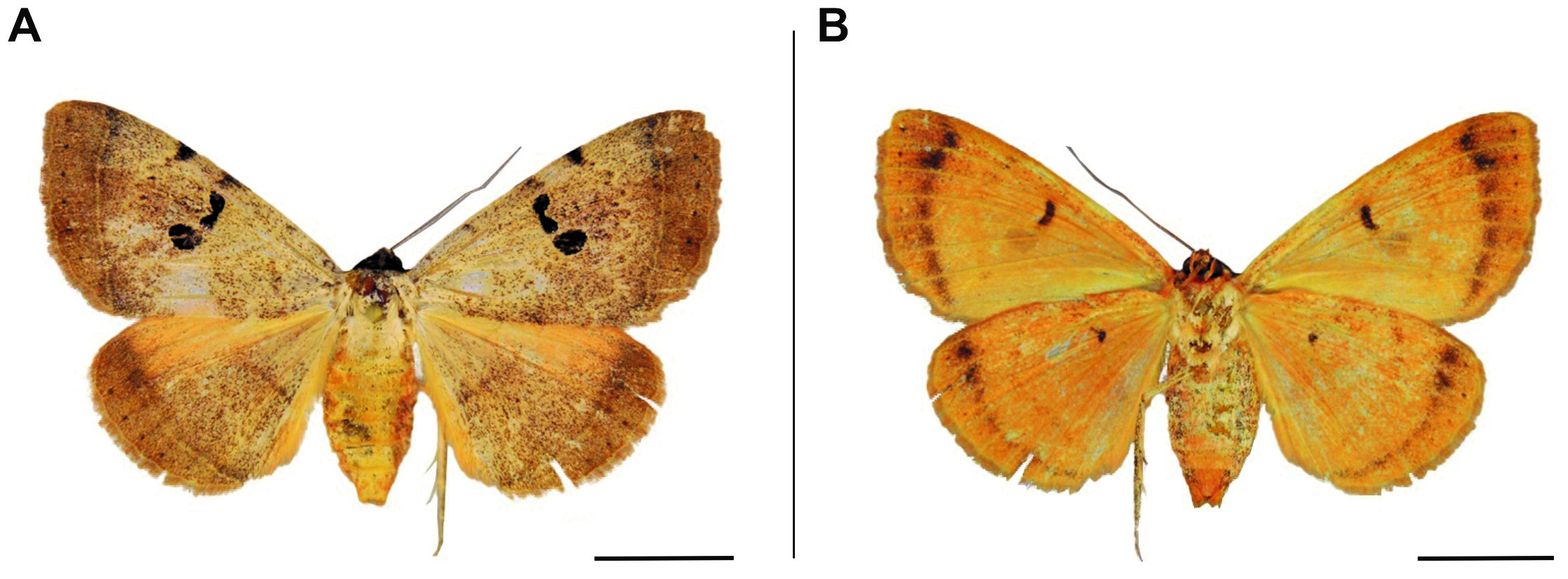

Scientific classification
- Domain: Eukaryota
- Kingdom: Animalia
- Phylum: Arthropoda
- Class: Insecta
- Order: Lepidoptera
- Superfamily: Noctuoidea
- Family: Erebidae
- Genus: Hypopyra
- Species: H. africana

Binomial name
- Hypopyra africana (Kirby, 1896)

Synonyms
- Maxula africana Kirby, 1896

= Hypopyra africana =

Species of moth

Hypopyra africana is a moth of the family Erebidae. It is found in Botswana, Kenya, Tanzania and Zambia.
