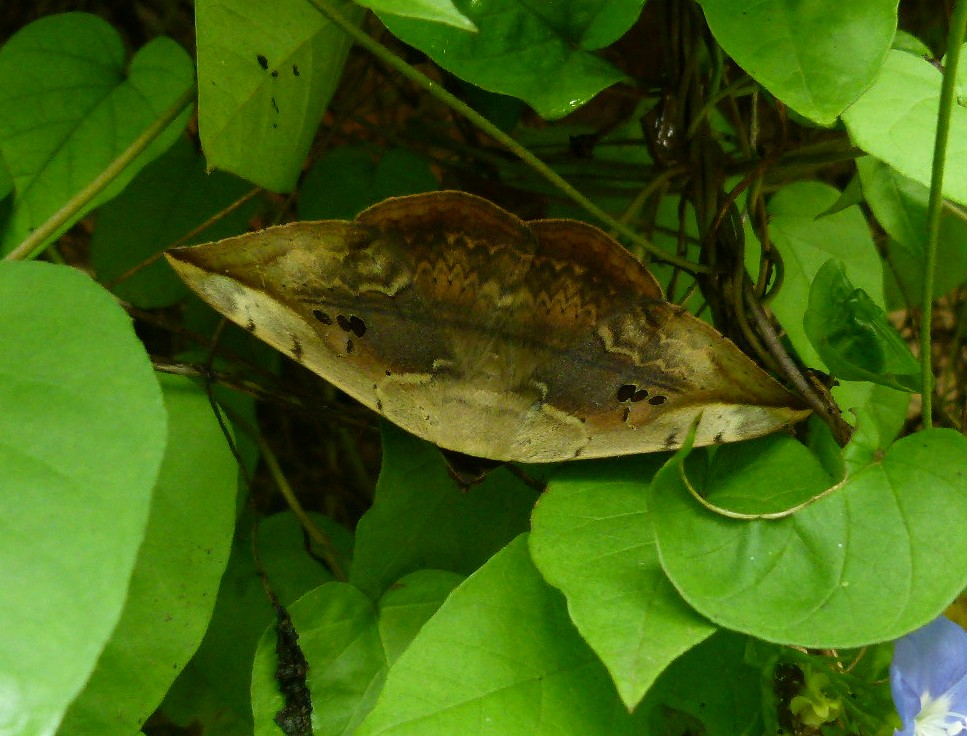
- Hypopyra vespertilio, or a closely related species
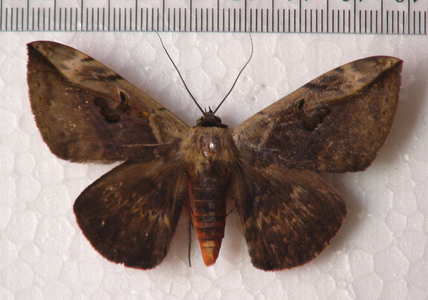

Scientific classification
- Domain: Eukaryota
- Kingdom: Animalia
- Phylum: Arthropoda
- Class: Insecta
- Order: Lepidoptera
- Superfamily: Noctuoidea
- Family: Erebidae
- Genus: Hypopyra
- Species: H. vespertilio

Binomial name
- Hypopyra vespertilio (Fabricius, 1787)

Synonyms
- Noctua vespertilio Fabricius, 1787; Hypopyra distans Moore, 1882; Hypopyra dulcina Felder and Rogenhofer, 1874; Hypopyra extricans Walker, 1858; Spirama hypopyroides Walker, 1863; Hypopyra pallida Moore, 1883; Hypopyra pandia Felder and Rogenhofer, 1874; Hypopyra shiva Guenée, 1852; Hypopyra signata Walker, 1869

= Hypopyra vespertilio =

Species of moth

Hypopyra vespertilio is a moth of the family Erebidae first described by Johan Christian Fabricius in 1787. It is found in China, Korea, Honshu in Japan, India (Maharashtra, Jammu and Kashmir, West Bengal), Sri Lanka, Nepal, Thailand, Myanmar, Cambodia, Vietnam, Taiwan, Malaysia, the Philippines, Java, Sumatra and Sulawesi.

== Description ==
The wingspan is 74–90 mm in male and 72–104 mm in female. Male has minutely fasciculate antennae. Male with an erectile tuft of long hair from femur-tibial joint of forelegs. Tibia and hind tarsi not fringed with long hair, nor the hindwings clothed with long woolly hair on ventral side. The wings are grey suffused with slight fuscous brown. The forewings have the stigma usually reduced to spots or to two spots on discocellulars. The antemedial line is excurved below the costa then oblique to the inner margin. There is a double postmedial line, angled below the costa. The postmedial line is crenulate. The hindwings are fuscous brown with antemedial oblique lines. The medial and submarginal lines are crenulate and the inner margin is crimson. The darkest form is vespertilio which has the male dark brown; the costal and outer areas of forewing suffused with grey and olive; the stigma most developed; female much paler and greyer. The adult has been recorded as fruit-piercer.

== Ecology ==
The larvae feed on Albizia, Acacia, Wisteria and possibly Camellia species. They are pale grey.
