= Paralacydes ramosa =

Scientific classification
- Kingdom: Animalia
- Phylum: Arthropoda
- Clade: Pancrustacea
- Class: Insecta
- Order: Lepidoptera
- Superfamily: Noctuoidea
- Family: Erebidae
- Subfamily: Arctiinae
- Genus: Paralacydes
- Species: P. ramosa

Binomial name
- Paralacydes ramosa (Hampson, 1907)

Synonyms
- Maenas ramosa Hampson, 1907

Species of moth

Paralacydes ramosa is a moth of the family Erebidae. It was described by George Hampson in 1907. It is found in Malawi, Mozambique, South Africa, Tanzania and Zimbabwe.
