= Hypopyra villicosta =

Scientific classification
- Kingdom: Animalia
- Phylum: Arthropoda
- Clade: Pancrustacea
- Class: Insecta
- Order: Lepidoptera
- Superfamily: Noctuoidea
- Family: Erebidae
- Genus: Hypopyra
- Species: H. villicosta

Binomial name
- Hypopyra villicosta (Prout, 1919)

Synonyms
- Enmonodia villicosta Prout, 1919

Species of moth

Hypopyra villicosta is a moth of the family Erebidae. It is found in the Philippines (Mindanao).
