= Hypopyra pudens =

Scientific classification
- Kingdom: Animalia
- Phylum: Arthropoda
- Class: Insecta
- Order: Lepidoptera
- Superfamily: Noctuoidea
- Family: Erebidae
- Genus: Hypopyra
- Species: H. pudens

Binomial name
- Hypopyra pudens Walker, 1858

Synonyms
- Enmonodia pudens; Hypopyra grandaeva Felder & Rogenhofer, 1874; Hypopyra persimilis Moore, 1877; Enmonodia hypopyroides Walker, 1858

Species of moth

Hypopyra pudens is a moth of the family Erebidae. It is found in Japan, India (Hindustan), Thailand, Vietnam, Singapore, Taiwan, Borneo, Sumatra and Sulawesi. The habitat ranges from lowland areas, including disturbed and coastal areas, up to 1,618 meters.

The length of the forewings is about 43 mm.

The larvae feed on Paraserianthes species, including Paraserianthes falcataria (= Falcataria moluccana).
