= Paralacydes =

Scientific classification
- Domain: Eukaryota
- Kingdom: Animalia
- Phylum: Arthropoda
- Class: Insecta
- Order: Lepidoptera
- Superfamily: Noctuoidea
- Family: Erebidae
- Subfamily: Arctiinae
- Subtribe: Spilosomina
- Genus: Paralacydes; Aurivillius, 1899 [1900]

Type species
- Phalaena vocula Stoll, 1790

Synonyms
- Maenas Hübner, [1819] 1816; Eutaenia Wallengren, 1875; Caligula Aurivillius, 1879

Genus of moths

Paralacydes is a genus of moths in the family Erebidae from the Afrotropics.

== Species ==
- Paralacydes arborifera (Butler, 1875)
- Paralacydes destrictus Kühne, 2010
- Paralacydes bomfordi (Pinhey, 1968)
- Paralacydes vocula (Stoll, 1790)

=== Paralacydes sensu lato species not congeneric to the Paralacydes vocula ===
- Paralacydes bivittata (Bartel, 1903)
- Paralacydes fiorii (Berio, 1937)
- Paralacydes jeskei (Grünberg, 1911)
- Paralacydes minorata (Berio, 1935)
- Paralacydes ramosa (Hampson, 1907)
