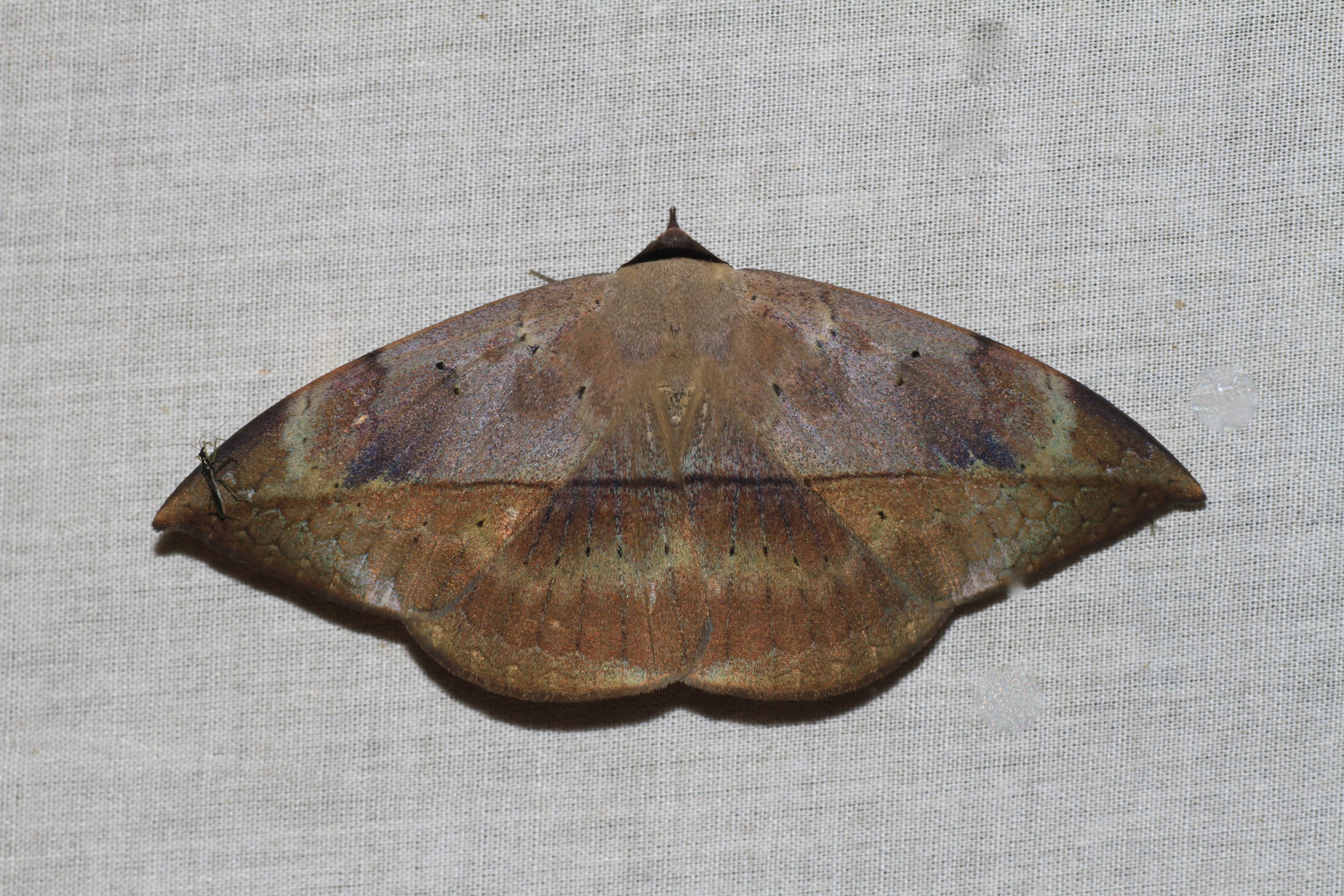
- Hypopyra lactipex - Trusmadi area, Borneo

Scientific classification
- Kingdom: Animalia
- Phylum: Arthropoda
- Class: Insecta
- Order: Lepidoptera
- Superfamily: Noctuoidea
- Family: Erebidae
- Genus: Hypopyra
- Species: H. lactipex

Binomial name
- Hypopyra lactipex (Hampson, 1913)

Synonyms
- Enmonodia lactipex Hampson, 1913

= Hypopyra lactipex =

Species of moth

Hypopyra lactipex is a moth of the family Erebidae. It is found on Peninsular Malaysia, Borneo, Sumatra and possibly Sulawesi. The habitat consists of lowland forests, disturbed coastal forests and heath forests.
