= Hypopyra unistrigata =

Scientific classification
- Kingdom: Animalia
- Phylum: Arthropoda
- Class: Insecta
- Order: Lepidoptera
- Superfamily: Noctuoidea
- Family: Erebidae
- Genus: Hypopyra
- Species: H. unistrigata

Binomial name
- Hypopyra unistrigata Guenée, 1852

Synonyms
- Maxula idonea Walker, 1865; Angerona poeusaria Walker, 1860

Species of moth

Hypopyra unistrigata is a moth of the family Erebidae first described by Achille Guenée in 1852. It is found in China, India (West Bengal), Bangladesh, Sri Lanka (Trincomalee) and Cambodia.

== Description ==
Its wingspan is about 52–58 mm in the male and 54–68 mm in the female. Antennae of male with bristles and cilia. Fore and hind tibia sometimes spined. Male is grey speckled with brown color. Head dark colored. Forewings with curved and waved antemedial, medial and postmedial lines. Stigma sometimes well developed, usually reduced to spots or obsolete. A pale straight sub-marginal line found runs to both wings. Female much paler and greyer. Specimens found from Myanmar has the lilacine greyish ground color, where the female grey and vinous red suffused. Sri Lankan male form is purplish with a reddish tinge and some yellow on postmedial line of forewings.
