= Hypopyra guttata =

Scientific classification
- Kingdom: Animalia
- Phylum: Arthropoda
- Class: Insecta
- Order: Lepidoptera
- Superfamily: Noctuoidea
- Family: Erebidae
- Genus: Hypopyra
- Species: H. guttata

Binomial name
- Hypopyra guttata Wallengren, 1856

Species of moth

Hypopyra guttata is a moth of the family Erebidae. It is found in South Africa.
