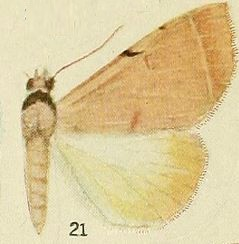

Scientific classification
- Kingdom: Animalia
- Phylum: Arthropoda
- Class: Insecta
- Order: Lepidoptera
- Superfamily: Noctuoidea
- Family: Noctuidae (?)
- Subfamily: Catocalinae
- Genus: Ctenusa; Hampson, 1910

= Ctenusa =

Genus of moths

Ctenusa is a genus of moths of the family Noctuidae.

== Species ==
- Ctenusa curvilinea Hampson, 1913
- Ctenusa pallida Hampson, 1902
- Ctenusa varians Wallengren, 1863
