= Hypopyra ochracea =

Scientific classification
- Domain: Eukaryota
- Kingdom: Animalia
- Phylum: Arthropoda
- Class: Insecta
- Order: Lepidoptera
- Superfamily: Noctuoidea
- Family: Erebidae
- Genus: Hypopyra
- Species: H. ochracea

Binomial name
- Hypopyra ochracea (Candeze, 1927)

Synonyms
- Enmonodia ochracea Candeze, 1927

Species of moth

Hypopyra ochracea is a moth of the family Erebidae. It is found in Indo China.
