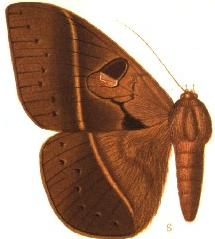

Scientific classification
- Kingdom: Animalia
- Phylum: Arthropoda
- Class: Insecta
- Order: Lepidoptera
- Superfamily: Noctuoidea
- Family: Erebidae
- Genus: Hypopyra
- Species: H. spermatophora

Binomial name
- Hypopyra spermatophora (Hampson, 1913)

Synonyms
- Enmonodia spermatophora Hampson, 1913

= Hypopyra spermatophora =

Species of moth

Hypopyra spermatophora is a moth of the family Erebidae. It is found in India (Assam).
