= Paralacydes bomfordi =

Scientific classification
- Domain: Eukaryota
- Kingdom: Animalia
- Phylum: Arthropoda
- Class: Insecta
- Order: Lepidoptera
- Superfamily: Noctuoidea
- Family: Erebidae
- Subfamily: Arctiinae
- Genus: Paralacydes
- Species: P. bomfordi

Binomial name
- Paralacydes bomfordi (Pinhey, 1968)

Synonyms
- Maenas bomfordi Pinhey, 1968

Species of moth

Paralacydes bomfordi is a moth of the family Erebidae. It was described by Pinhey in 1968. It is found in South Africa and Zimbabwe.
