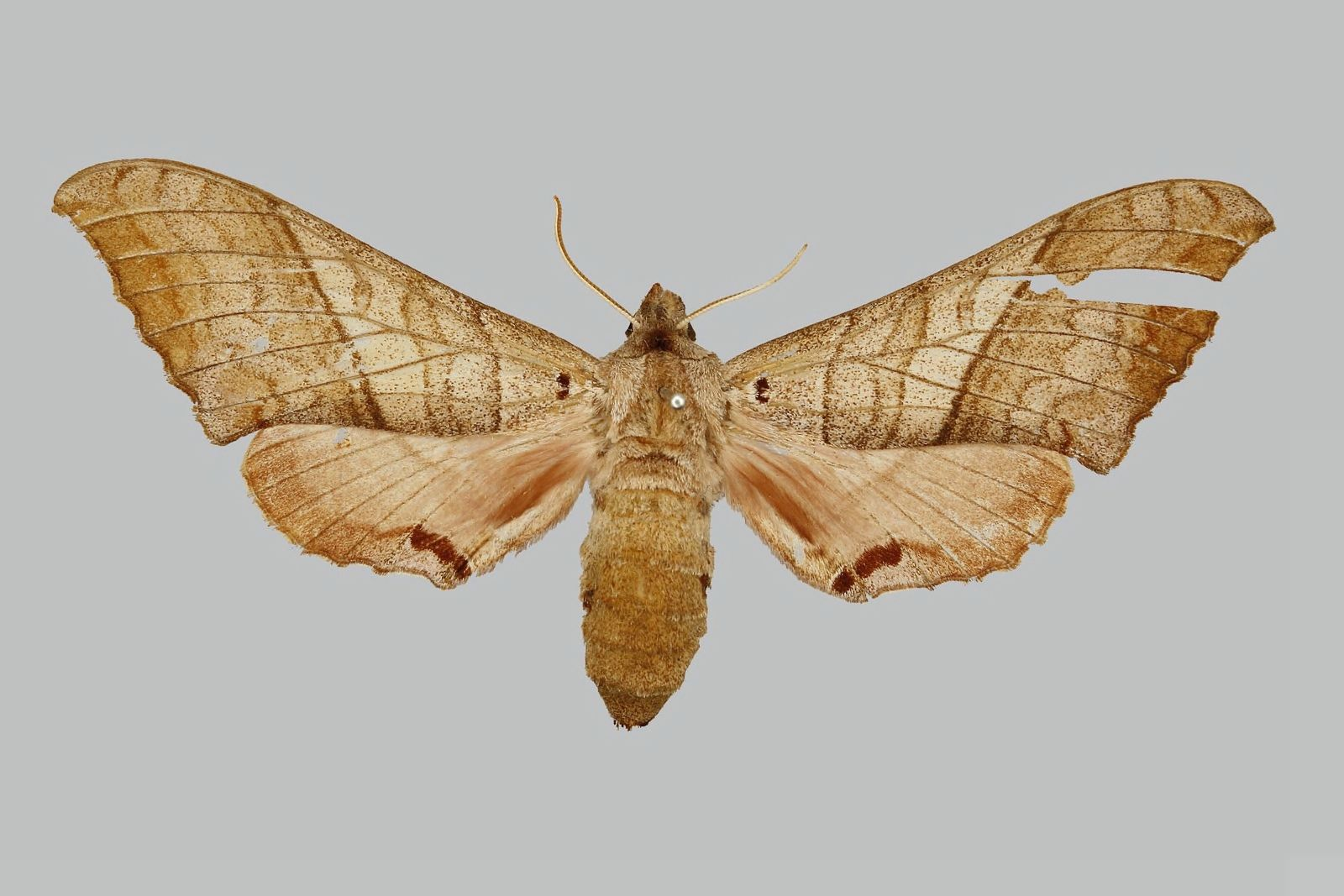

Scientific classification
- Domain: Eukaryota
- Kingdom: Animalia
- Phylum: Arthropoda
- Class: Insecta
- Order: Lepidoptera
- Family: Sphingidae
- Genus: Rufoclanis
- Species: R. fulgurans

Binomial name
- Rufoclanis fulgurans (Rothschild & Jordan, 1903)

Synonyms
- Polyptychus fulgurans Rothschild & Jordan, 1903

= Rufoclanis fulgurans =

Species of moth

Rufoclanis fulgurans is a moth of the family Sphingidae. It is known from dry savanna and bush from Zimbabwe to Tanzania and eastern Kenya.

The length of the forewings is 22–32 mm for males and about 40 mm for females.
