= Adisura litarga =

Scientific classification
- Domain: Eukaryota
- Kingdom: Animalia
- Phylum: Arthropoda
- Class: Insecta
- Order: Lepidoptera
- Superfamily: Noctuoidea
- Family: Noctuidae
- Genus: Adisura
- Species: A. litarga

Binomial name
- Adisura litarga (Turner, 1920)

Synonyms
- Astonycha litarga Turner, 1920

Species of moth

Adisura litarga is a species of moth of the family Noctuidae. It is found on Sulawesi and in Queensland.
