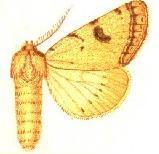

Scientific classification
- Kingdom: Animalia
- Phylum: Arthropoda
- Class: Insecta
- Order: Lepidoptera
- Superfamily: Noctuoidea
- Family: Noctuidae (?)
- Genus: Ctenusa
- Species: C. varians

Binomial name
- Ctenusa varians Wallengren, 1863

Synonyms
- Agrotis varians; Agrotis marginalis (preoccupied); Agrotis marginifera; Chalciope pretoriae; Acanthonyx seriopuncta; Acanthonyx pretoriae; Ctenusa marginalis Walker, 1858; Ctenusa marginifera Walker, 1865; Ctenusa pretoriae Distant, 1902; Ctenusa seriopuncta Hampson, 1916

= Ctenusa varians =

Species of moth

Ctenusa varians is a moth of the family Noctuidae. The species can be found in Somalia south to South Africa.
