= Paralacydes destrictus =

Scientific classification
- Domain: Eukaryota
- Kingdom: Animalia
- Phylum: Arthropoda
- Class: Insecta
- Order: Lepidoptera
- Superfamily: Noctuoidea
- Family: Erebidae
- Subfamily: Arctiinae
- Genus: Paralacydes
- Species: P. destrictus

Binomial name
- Paralacydes destrictus Kühne, 2010

Species of moth

Paralacydes destrictus is a moth of the family Erebidae. It was described by Lars Kühne in 2010. It is found in Botswana, Namibia and Zimbabwe.
