= Paralacydes jeskei =

Scientific classification
- Domain: Eukaryota
- Kingdom: Animalia
- Phylum: Arthropoda
- Class: Insecta
- Order: Lepidoptera
- Superfamily: Noctuoidea
- Family: Erebidae
- Subfamily: Arctiinae
- Genus: Paralacydes
- Species: P. jeskei

Binomial name
- Paralacydes jeskei (Grünberg, 1911)

Synonyms
- Maenas jeskei Grünberg, 1911

Species of moth

Paralacydes jeskei is a moth of the family Erebidae. It was described by Karl Grünberg in 1911. It is found in Botswana, Namibia and South Africa.
