= Anaudia =

Scientific classification
- Kingdom: Animalia
- Phylum: Arthropoda
- Class: Insecta
- Order: Lepidoptera
- Family: Sesiidae
- Genus: Anaudia; Wallengren, 1863
- Species: A. felderi

Binomial name
- Anaudia felderi Wallengren, 1863

Genus of moths

Anaudia is a genus of moths in the family Sesiidae containing only one species, Anaudia felderi, which is known from Botswana.
