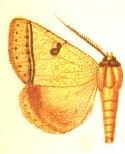

Scientific classification
- Kingdom: Animalia
- Phylum: Arthropoda
- Class: Insecta
- Order: Lepidoptera
- Superfamily: Noctuoidea
- Family: Noctuidae (?)
- Genus: Ctenusa
- Species: C. pallida

Binomial name
- Ctenusa pallida (Hampson, 1902)

Synonyms
- Calliodes pallida; Ctenusa carnicolor; Chalciope carnicolor Hampson, 1902; Ctenusa brevipecten Hampson, 1913; Ctenusa rufirena Hampson, 1910

= Ctenusa pallida =

Species of moth

Ctenusa pallida is a moth of the family Noctuidae. The species can be found in Botswana, Namibia, Nigeria, Zambia south to South Africa.
