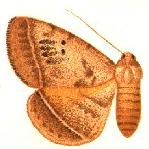

Scientific classification
- Kingdom: Animalia
- Phylum: Arthropoda
- Class: Insecta
- Order: Lepidoptera
- Superfamily: Noctuoidea
- Family: Erebidae
- Genus: Hypopyra
- Species: H. carneotincta

Binomial name
- Hypopyra carneotincta (Hampson, 1913)

Synonyms
- Enmonodia carneotincta Hampson, 1913

= Hypopyra carneotincta =

Species of moth

Hypopyra carneotincta is a moth of the family Erebidae. It is found in Botswana and South Africa.
