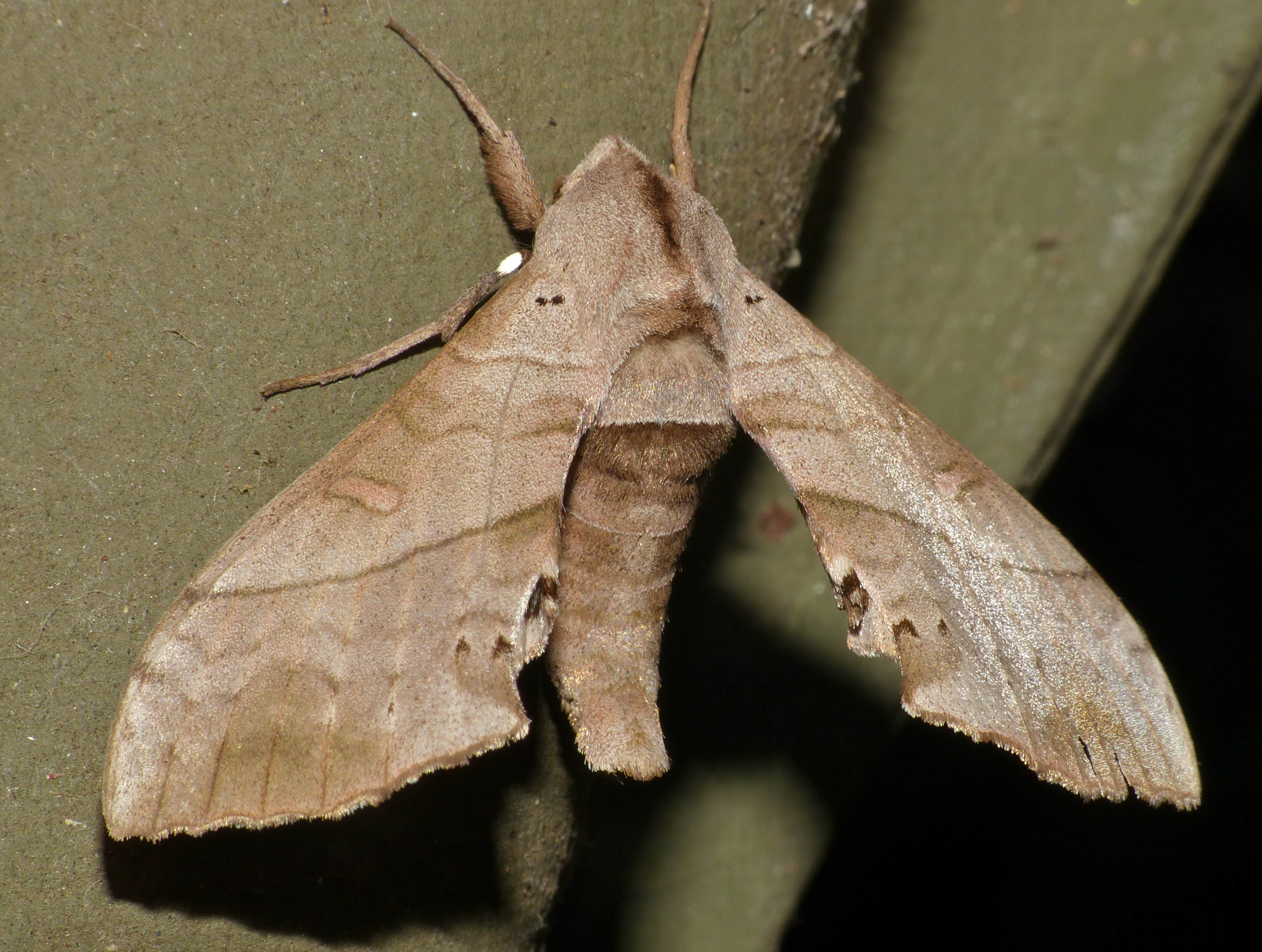

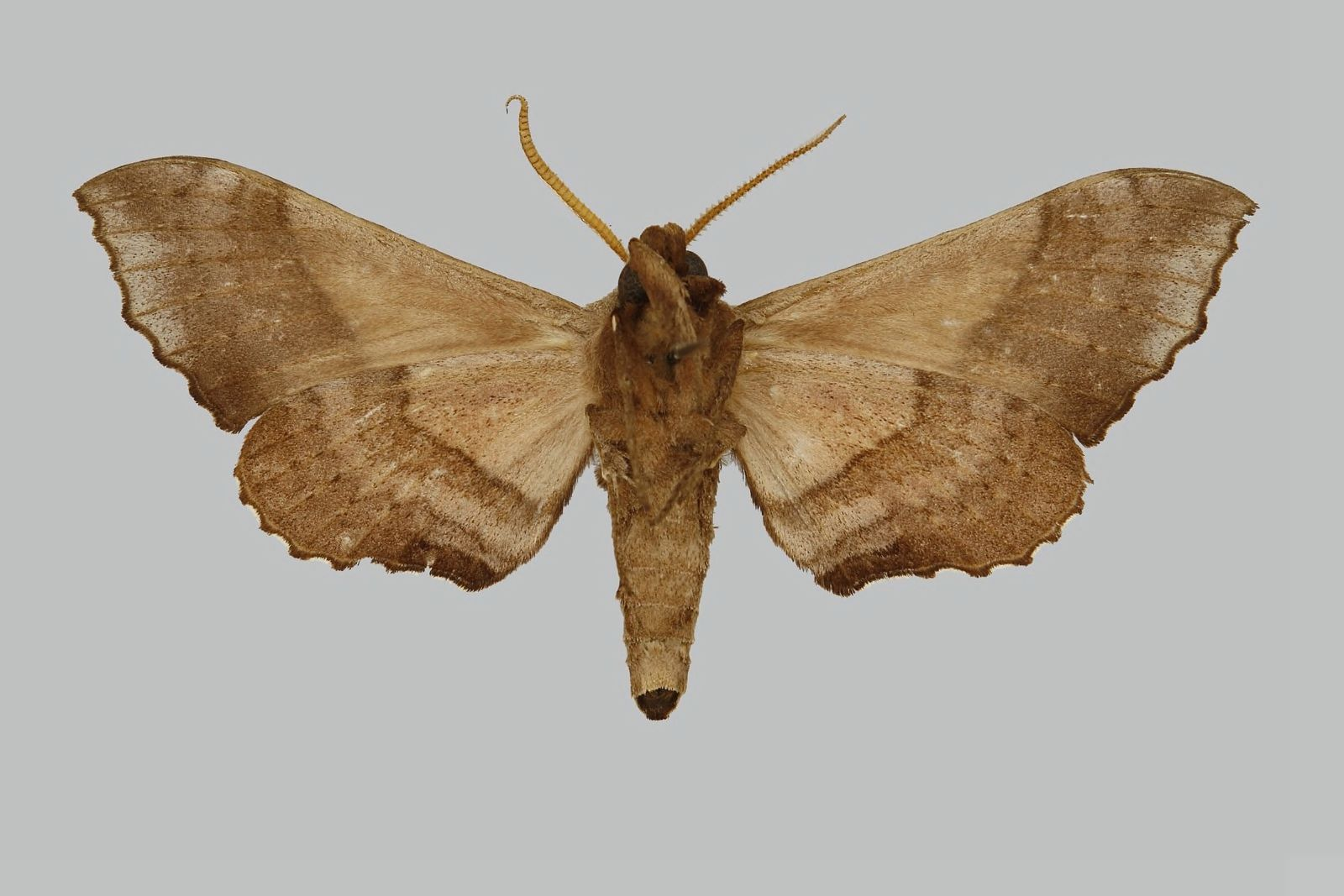

Scientific classification
- Domain: Eukaryota
- Kingdom: Animalia
- Phylum: Arthropoda
- Class: Insecta
- Order: Lepidoptera
- Family: Sphingidae
- Genus: Rufoclanis
- Species: R. numosae

Binomial name
- Rufoclanis numosae (Wallengren, 1860)

Synonyms
- Smerinthus numosae Wallengren, 1860; Polyptychus consanguineus Distant, 1899; Rufoclanis numosae hesperus (Rothschild & Jordan, 1916); Triptogon cytis Druce, 1882; Polyptychus fumosus Rothschild & Jordan, 1903; Polyptychus kindunus Strand, 1918; Polyptychus pelops Fawcett, 1915

= Rufoclanis numosae =

Wavy polyptychus

Species of moth

Rufoclanis numosae, the wavy polyptychus, is a moth of the family Sphingidae. The species was first described by Hans Daniel Johan Wallengren in 1860. It is known from dry bush and arid savanna in much of eastern and southern Africa.

The length of the forewings is 22–30 mm for males and 34–36 mm for females and the wingspan is 54–58 mm.

== Subspecies ==
- Rufoclanis numosae numosae — Democratic Republic of the Congo, Tanzania, Namibia, Zimbabwe, north-eastern South Africa
- Rufoclanis numosae rostislavi Haxaire & Melichar, 2009 — Ethiopia
- Rufoclanis numosae subjectus (Walker, 1869) — Somalia, Kenya, Tanzania, Zambia
