= Adisura atkinsoni =

Field-bean pod borer

Scientific classification
- Kingdom: Animalia
- Phylum: Arthropoda
- Clade: Pancrustacea
- Class: Insecta
- Order: Lepidoptera
- Superfamily: Noctuoidea
- Family: Noctuidae
- Genus: Adisura
- Species: A. atkinsoni

Binomial name
- Adisura atkinsoni Moore, 1881

Synonyms
- Adisura leucanioides Moore, 1881; Adisura pallida Moore, 1881; Adisura atcinsoni Hampson, 1903

Species of moth

Adisura atkinsoni, the field-bean pod borer, is a moth of the family Noctuidae. The species was first described by Frederic Moore in 1881. It is found in Lesotho, KwaZulu-Natal, Transvaal, Zimbabwe, Mozambique, Zambia, Malawi, Congo, Kenya, Uganda and on Madagascar. It is also present in India, China, Korea, Indonesia (Sumatra), Japan (Honshu, Shikoku, Kyushu), Sri Lanka, Taiwan, Vietnam and the Himalayan region.

== Description ==
Its wingspan is about 31 mm. Head, thorax and forewings are brownish ochreous. Forewings have a greyish tinge and pinkish costa and outer areas. Orbicular and reniform stigmata represented by indistinct dark patches. There is an indistinct series of specks. Abdomen and hindwings are straw coloured. Hindwings are more or less broadly and completely suffused with fuscous. Ventral side usually consist with reniform prominently black.

Larva robust and instars change from green to brown towards pupa.

== Ecology ==
It is considered a mild pest on Lablab purpureus and considered as a serious pest on field bean, causing moderate to severe loss. Larva known to feed on field bean and also pigeon pea primarily.

Control is mainly through chemical pesticides such as quinalphos and carbaryl in the caterpillar stage. Natural enemies like Habrobracon hebetor, Trichogramma chlionis, green lacewing, predatory stink bugs, spider, and ants are also effective. Usage of resistant varieties, trapping using pheromones, and light traps are also undertaken.
