= Adisura straminea =

Scientific classification
- Kingdom: Animalia
- Phylum: Arthropoda
- Class: Insecta
- Order: Lepidoptera
- Superfamily: Noctuoidea
- Family: Noctuidae
- Genus: Adisura
- Species: A. straminea

Binomial name
- Adisura straminea Hampson, 1902

Species of moth

Adisura straminea is a species of moth of the family Noctuidae first described by George Hampson in 1902. It is found in Africa, including South Africa.
