= Phyllonorycter anchistea =

Scientific classification
- Kingdom: Animalia
- Phylum: Arthropoda
- Class: Insecta
- Order: Lepidoptera
- Family: Gracillariidae
- Genus: Phyllonorycter
- Species: P. anchistea

Binomial name
- Phyllonorycter anchistea (Vári, 1961)

Synonyms
- Lithocolletis anchistea Vári, 1961

Species of moth

Phyllonorycter anchistea is a moth of the family Gracillariidae. It is known from South Africa and Botswana. The habitat consists of savannah or semi-urban areas with low growing trees and bush vegetation.

The length of the forewings is 2.5–3.3 mm. Adults are on wing almost all year except from August to November.
