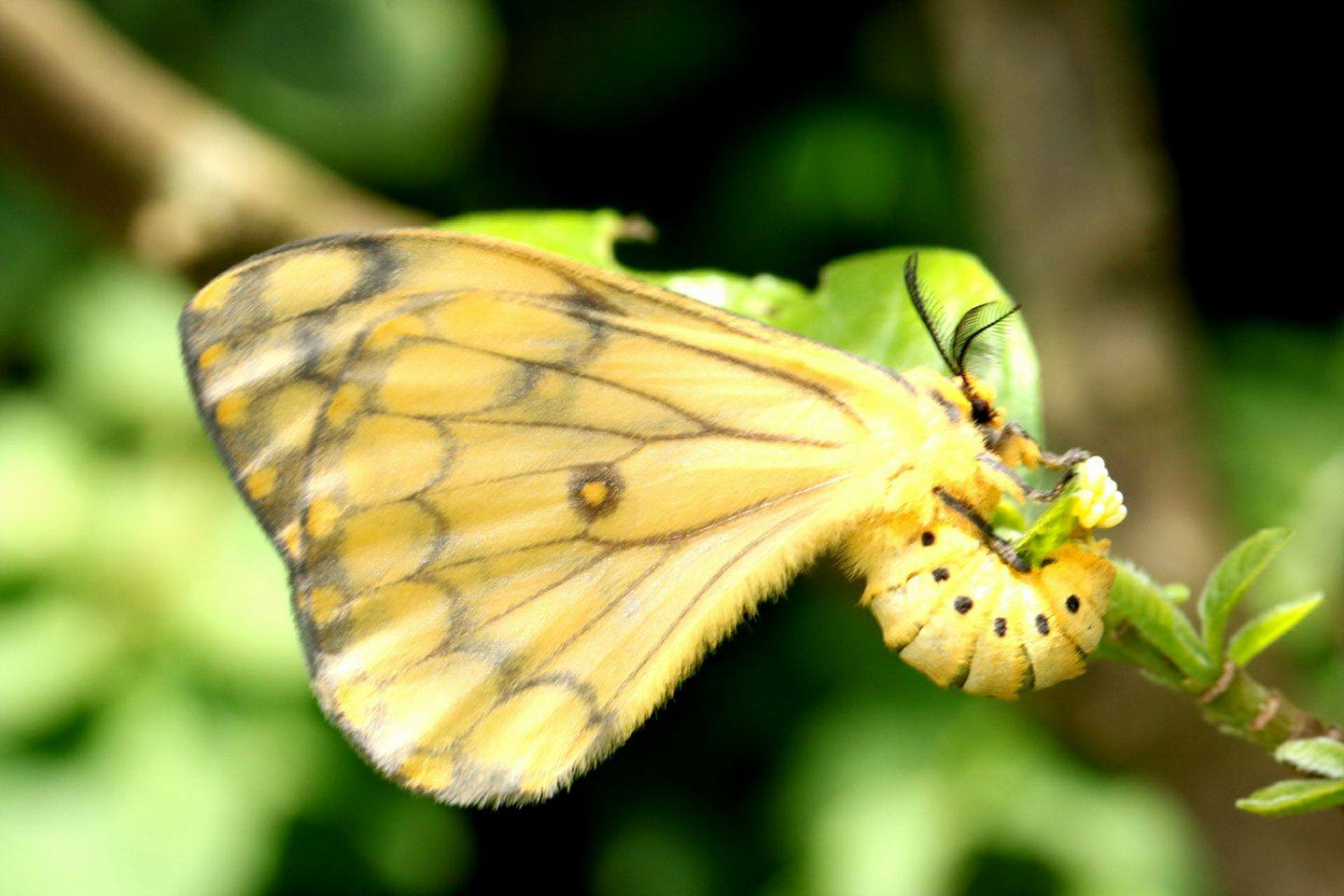

Scientific classification
- Kingdom: Animalia
- Phylum: Arthropoda
- Class: Insecta
- Order: Lepidoptera
- Family: Saturniidae
- Genus: Pseudaphelia
- Species: P. apollinaris

Binomial name
- Pseudaphelia apollinaris Boisduval, 1847

Synonyms
- Pseudaphelia paleacea

= Pseudaphelia apollinaris =

Species of moth

Pseudaphelia apollinaris is a species of moth in the family Saturniidae first described by Jean Baptiste Boisduval in 1847.
