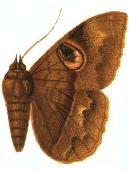

Scientific classification
- Kingdom: Animalia
- Phylum: Arthropoda
- Class: Insecta
- Order: Lepidoptera
- Superfamily: Noctuoidea
- Family: Erebidae
- Genus: Hypopyra
- Species: H. ossigera

Binomial name
- Hypopyra ossigera Guenée, 1852

Synonyms
- Enmonodia ossigera

= Hypopyra ossigera =

Species of moth

Hypopyra ossigera is a moth of the family Erebidae. It is found in China (Yunnan), Taiwan, India (Sikkim, Assam, West Bengal), Thailand, Vietnam, Malaysia, Borneo, Sulawesi and Sumatra.

The wingspan is 56–74 mm.
